= Shep Gordon =

American talent manager and film producer

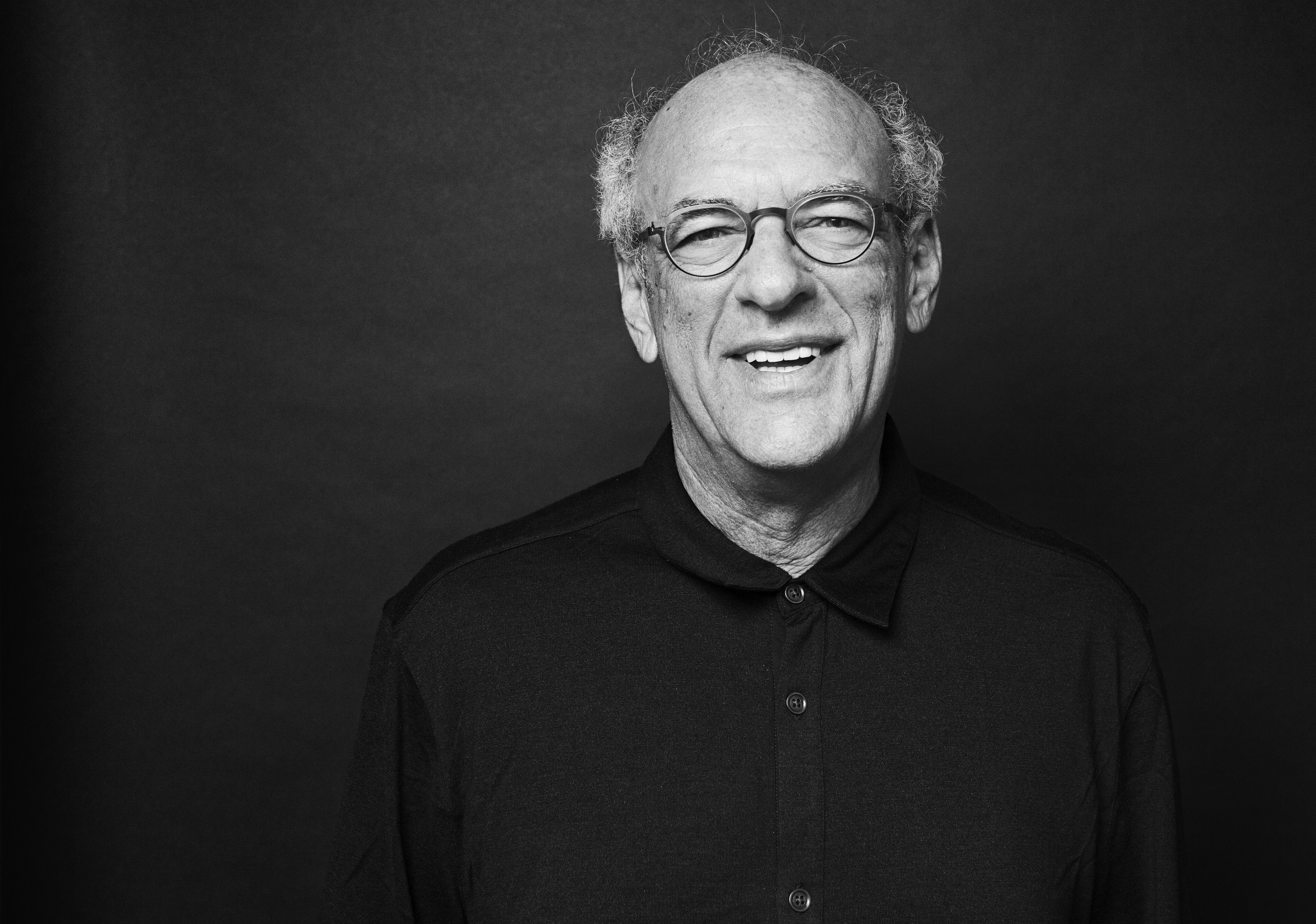
- Born: October 18, 1945 (age 80); Jackson Heights, Queens, New York City, New York, U.S
- Education: University at Buffalo
- Occupations: Talent manager, film agent, film producer
- Years active: 1968–present
- Spouses: Marcy Hanson (m. 1980; div. 1982) Renée Loux (m. 2005; div. 2011) Katie McMillan (m. 2020-present)
- Children: Benjamin Gordon

Shep E. Gordon (born October 18, 1945) is an American talent manager, Hollywood film agent, and producer. Gordon is featured in a 2013 documentary, Supermensch: The Legend of Shep Gordon, which was directed by Mike Myers.

== Life and education ==
Gordon was born in 1945 to a Jewish family in Jackson Heights, Queens.

He obtained his B.A. in 1968 from the State University of New York at Buffalo in sociology. While attending, he was a member of the Sigma Alpha Mu fraternity. He attended The New School for Social Research for post-graduation work. He then moved to Los Angeles, California, taking on a job as a probation officer.

== Career ==
=== Music career ===
Shep was first introduced to the band Alice Cooper by Jimi Hendrix, according to an Alice Cooper interview with Dan Rather. Gordon and his partner Joe Greenberg began to manage the group in 1968. Gordon went on to represent Anne Murray, Blondie, Teddy Pendergrass, Luther Vandross, Ben Vereen, Burton Cummings, The Calloways, Difford and Tilbrook, Frankie Valli, Gary Wright, George Clinton, Gipsy Kings, Groucho Marx, Jean-Luc Ponty, Johnny Clegg, Kenny Loggins, King Sunny Ade, Lisa Fischer, Majek Fashek, Maurice White, Michelle Shocked, Mtume, New Riders of the Purple Sage, Pink Floyd, Pointer Sisters, Raquel Welch, Rick James, Sarah Miles, Stephanie Mills and Yvonne Elliman.

Gordon was a partner with Sammy Hagar (then of Van Halen) on Cabo Wabo Tequila. He also partnered with Willie Nelson to create Old Whiskey River Bourbon.

=== Culinary career ===
In 1993 Gordon created Alive Culinary Resources, the first talent agency to represent chefs. In the words of Emeril Lagasse, “He single-handedly created celebrity chefs." His client list has included Celestino Drago, Charlie Trotter, Daniel Boulud, Dean Fearing, Emeril Lagasse, Jimmy Schmidt, Jonathan Waxman, Larry Forgione, Lydia Shire, Mark Miller, Mark Tarbell, Nobu Matsuhisa, Peter Merriman, Piero Selvaggio, Pino Luongo, Rovert Del Grande, Roger Vergé, Roy Yamaguchi, Sam Choy, Wolfgang Puck, and Alan Wong.

He has partnered in legendary restaurants including Tribeca Grill, Carlos'n Charlie's, Spice Market, and Maui Tacos (sold to Blimpie).

Gordon and Roy Yamaguchi were the Outback Steakhouse franchisees for Hawaii, and are now partnered in Humble Market Kitchen at the Wailea Beach Resort.

=== Speaking engagements ===
Gordon has spoken at various events; SXSW, Summit at Sea, and 92Y. He delivered the 2015 baccalaureate address at the Culinary Institute of America.

=== Film career ===
Gordon's first film as a producer, The Duellists, won the Cannes Film Festival in 1977. He went on to create one of the first independent film production companies in the U.S., Alive Films, who made Roadie (1980) starring Meat Loaf. In 1983, Alive formed a partnership with Island Records to create Island Alive who made and distributed films including Koyaanisqatsi, Kiss of the Spider Woman, Stop Making Sense and Choose Me. The partnership was dissolved in 1985. Whales of August was produced after the split.

Gordon also was Executive Producer on Wes Craven's Shocker and The People Under The Stairs, as well as John Carpenter's Prince of Darkness and Village of the Damned.

Mike Myers directed Supermensch: The Legend of Shep Gordon, a documentary on Shep's life, distributed theatrically by The Weinstein Company in 2013. It featured Michael Douglas, Sylvester Stallone, Alice Cooper, Steven Tyler, Willie Nelson and Sammy Hagar.

Gordon's memoir is titled, They Call Me Supermensch: A Backstage Pass to the Amazing Worlds of Film, Food, and Rock 'n' Roll. It was released on September 20, 2016, published through Anthony Bourdain's HarperCollins imprint, and debuted on the New York Times Best Seller List.

== Awards ==
- University at Buffalo Distinguished Alumni Award
- Hawaii Restaurant Association Hall Of Fame Inductee
- Maui Film Festival Maverick Award
- Fest Forward Lifetime Achievement Award
- National Conference of Personal Managers Hall of Fame Inductee
- Tibet Fund Friend of Tibet Award
- Hawaii European Cinema Maverick Award
- Hawaii Food And Wine Festival Honoree
- The Culinary Institute of America Leadership Award

== Philanthropy ==
Gordon serves on the board of the Tibet Fund with the Dalai Lama, and has had the honor of cooking for him on numerous occasions. He produced a visit of the Dalai Lama to State University of New York at Buffalo in 2006 and Maui in 2007. Gordon produces an annual benefit dinner in Maui, and has provided over 1,000,000 meals for those in need since 2008.

Gordon serves on the boards of The Maui Arts and Cultural Center, Reel FX, and the Tibet Fund. In 2017, he became a trustee of The Culinary Institute of America.

== Personal life ==
In 1973 Gordon began dating a woman named Winona Williams and became close with her daughter Mia, a bond that continued after the relationship with Winona broke up. Mia died in 1991 in a car crash, and Gordon subsequently adopted her four children Monique, Chase, Amber, and Keira. Gordon and his wife Katie had a son named Benjamin in 2021.
