= Cuisine of Hawaii =

Food and drinks from Hawaii

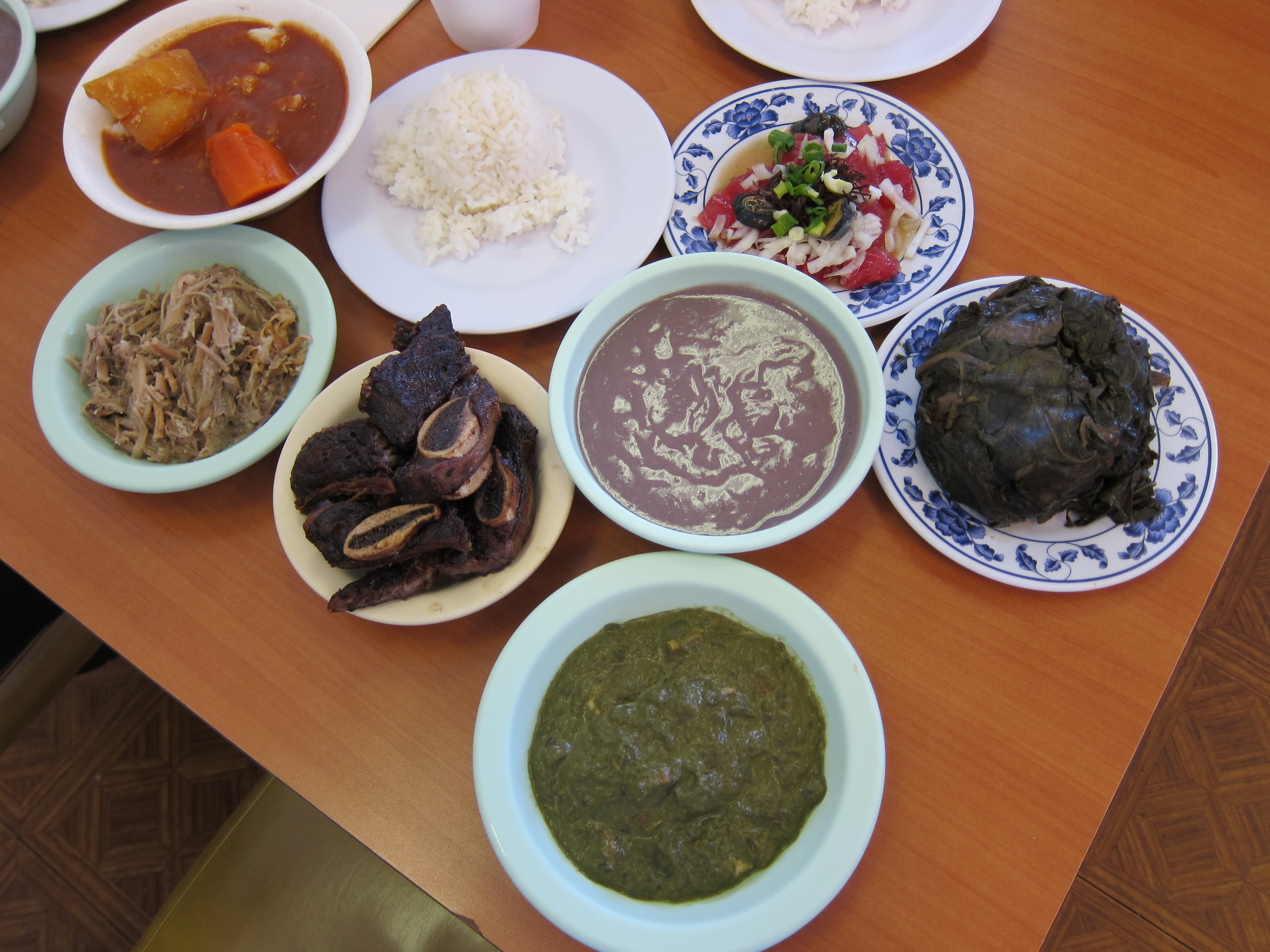
- Some modern Hawaiian dishes. From top left, clockwise: tripe stew (ʻōpū kū), rice (laiki), ʻopihi poke, laulau, squid lūʻau, pipikaula shortribs, kālua puaʻa (kālua pig), and poi in the center.
- Country or region: Hawaii
- National dish: Saimin
- National drink: Mai tai

The cuisine of Hawaii incorporates five distinct styles of food, reflecting the diverse food history of settlement and immigration in the Hawaiian Islands, primarily originating from Polynesian, North American and East Asian cuisines.^{[a]}

In the pre-contact period of Ancient Hawaii (300 AD–1778), Polynesian voyagers brought plants and animals to the Islands. As Native Hawaiians settled the area, they fished, raised taro for poi, planted coconuts, sugarcane, sweet potatoes and yams, and cooked meat and fish in earth ovens.

After first contact in 1778, European and American cuisine arrived along with missionaries and whalers, who introduced their foods and built large sugarcane plantations. Christian missionaries brought New England cuisine while whalers introduced salted fish which eventually transformed into lomilomi salmon.

As pineapple and sugarcane plantations grew, so did the demand for labor, bringing many immigrant groups to the Islands between 1850 and 1930. Immigrant workers brought cuisines from China, Korea, Japan, the Philippines, Puerto Rico and Portugal after arriving in Hawaii, introducing their new foods and influencing the region.

The introduction of new ethnic foods, such as Chinese Cantonese char siu bao (manapua), Portuguese sweet bread and malasadas, Puerto Rican pasteles, and the Japanese bento, combined with the existing indigenous, European and American foods in the plantation working environments and the local communities.

This blend of cuisines formed a "local food" style unique to Hawaii, resulting in plantation foods like the plate lunch, snacks like Spam musubi, and dishes like the loco moco. Shortly after World War II several well-known local restaurants opened their doors to serve "Hawaiian Food". Chefs further refined the local style and labeled it "Hawaii regional cuisine" in 1991, a style of cooking that makes use of locally grown ingredients to blend all of Hawaii's historical influences together to form a new fusion cuisine.

== History ==
=== Pre-contact period ===
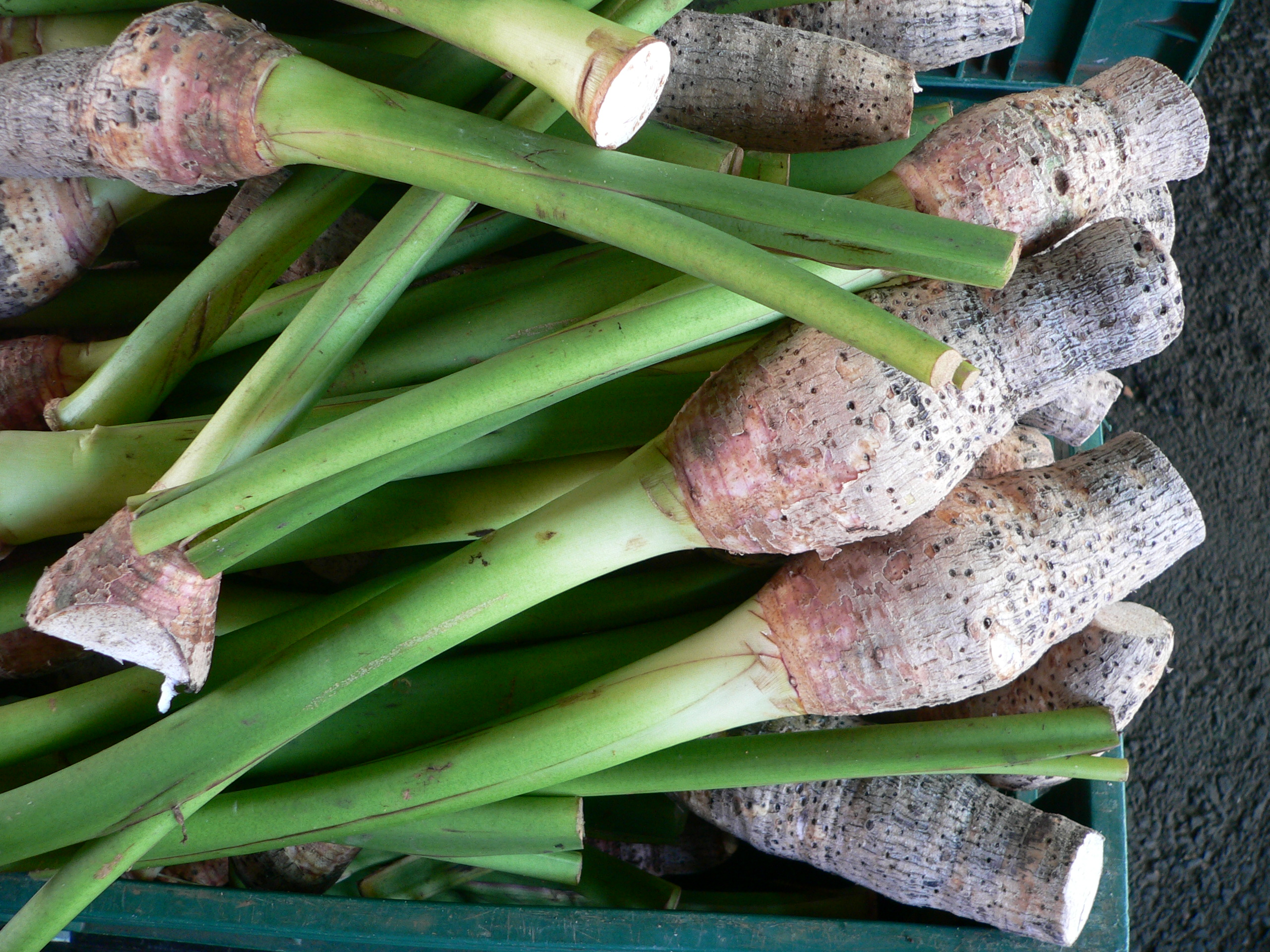
Taro, Colocasia esculenta, was brought to Hawaii by the Polynesians

When Polynesian seafarers arrived on the Hawaiian Islands in 1000–1200 AD, few edible plants existed in the new land, aside from ferns (hāpuʻu ʻiʻi, whose uncoiled fronds are eaten boiled) and fruits that grew at higher elevations. Botanists and archaeologists believe that the Polynesian voyagers introduced anywhere between 27 and more than 30 plants to the islands, known as canoe plants, mainly for food. The most important of them was taro.

For centuries taro, and the poi made from it, was the main staple of their diet, and it is still much loved today. In addition to taro the Polynesians brought sweet potatoes. These are believed to have come from Polynesian contact with the New World.

The Marquesans, the first settlers from Polynesia, brought breadfruit and the Tahitians later introduced the baking banana. These settlers from Polynesia also brought coconuts, candlenuts (known in Hawaiian as kukui nuts), and sugarcane. Later generations of these settlers however did not utilise coconuts as much as other related Polynesian groups down south. They found plenty of fish, shellfish, and limu in the new land. Flightless birds were easy to catch and nests were full of eggs for the taking.

Most Pacific islands had no meat animals except bats and lizards, so ancient Polynesians sailed the Pacific with pigs, chickens and dogs as cargo. Pigs were raised for religious sacrifice, and the meat was offered at altars, some of which was consumed by priests and the rest eaten in a mass celebration.

The early Hawaiian diet was diverse, and may have included as many as 130 different types of seafood and 230 types of sweet potatoes. Some species of land and sea birds were consumed into extinction.

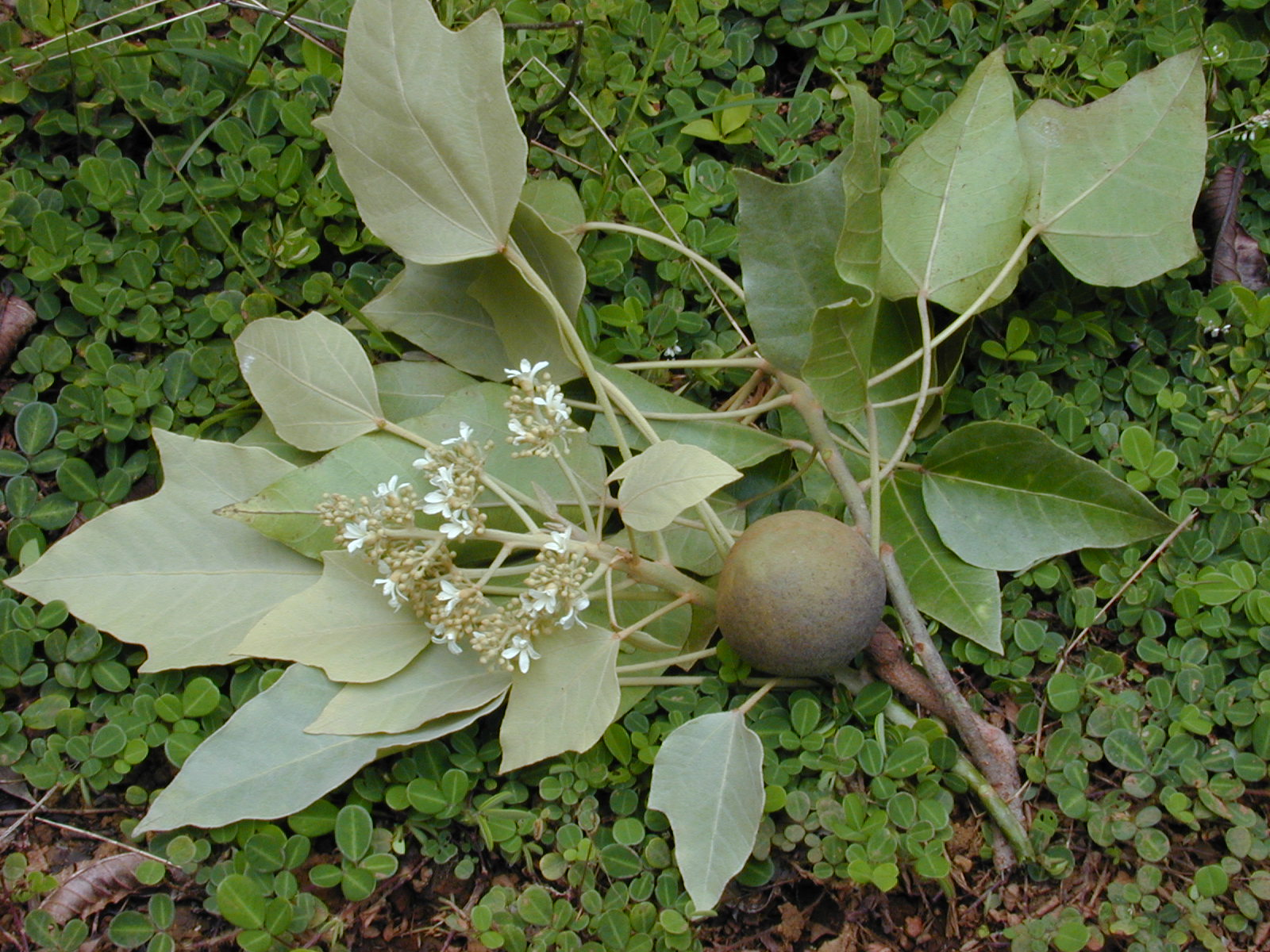
Kukui foliage, flowers, and nut (candlenut) was brought to Hawaii by Polynesians.

Sea salt was a common condiment in ancient Hawaii, and inamona, a relish made of roasted, mashed kukui nutmeats, sea salt and sometimes mixed with seaweeds, often accompanied the meals.

At important occasions, a traditional feast, ‘aha‘aina, was held. When a woman was to have her first child, her husband started raising a pig for the ‘Aha‘aina Mawaewae feast that was celebrated for the birth of a child. Besides the pig, mullet, shrimp, crab, seaweeds and taro leaves were required for the feast.

The modern name for such feasts, lū‘au, was not used until 1856, replacing the Hawaiian words ‘aha‘aina and pā‘ina. The name lū‘au came from the name of a food always served at a ‘aha‘aina, young taro tops baked with coconut milk and chicken or octopus.

Prior to cooking, pigs and dogs were killed by strangulation or by holding their nostrils shut, in order to conserve the animal's blood. Meat was prepared by flattening out the whole eviscerated animal and broiling it over hot coals, or it was spitted on sticks. Large pieces of meat, such as fowl, pigs and dogs, would be typically cooked in earth ovens, or spitted over a fire during ceremonial feasts.

Hawaiian earth ovens, known as an imu, combine roasting and steaming in a method called kālua. A pit is dug into the earth and lined with volcanic rocks and other rocks that do not split when heated to a high temperature, such as granite. A fire is built with embers, and when the rocks are glowing hot, the embers are removed and the foods wrapped in ti, ginger or banana leaves are put into the pit, covered with wet leaves, mats and a layer of earth. Water may be added through a bamboo tube to create steam.

The intense heat from the hot rocks cooked food thoroughly—the quantity of food for several days could be cooked at once, taken out and eaten as needed, and the cover replaced to keep the remainder warm. Sweet potatoes, taro, breadfruit and other vegetables were cooked in the imu, as well as fish. Saltwater eel was salted and dried before being put into the imu. Chickens, pigs and dogs were put into the imu with hot rocks inserted in the abdominal cavities.

Men did all of the cooking, and food for women was cooked in a separate imu; afterwards men and women ate meals separately.^{[c]} The ancient practice of cooking with the imu continues to this day, for special occasions.

=== Post-contact period ===
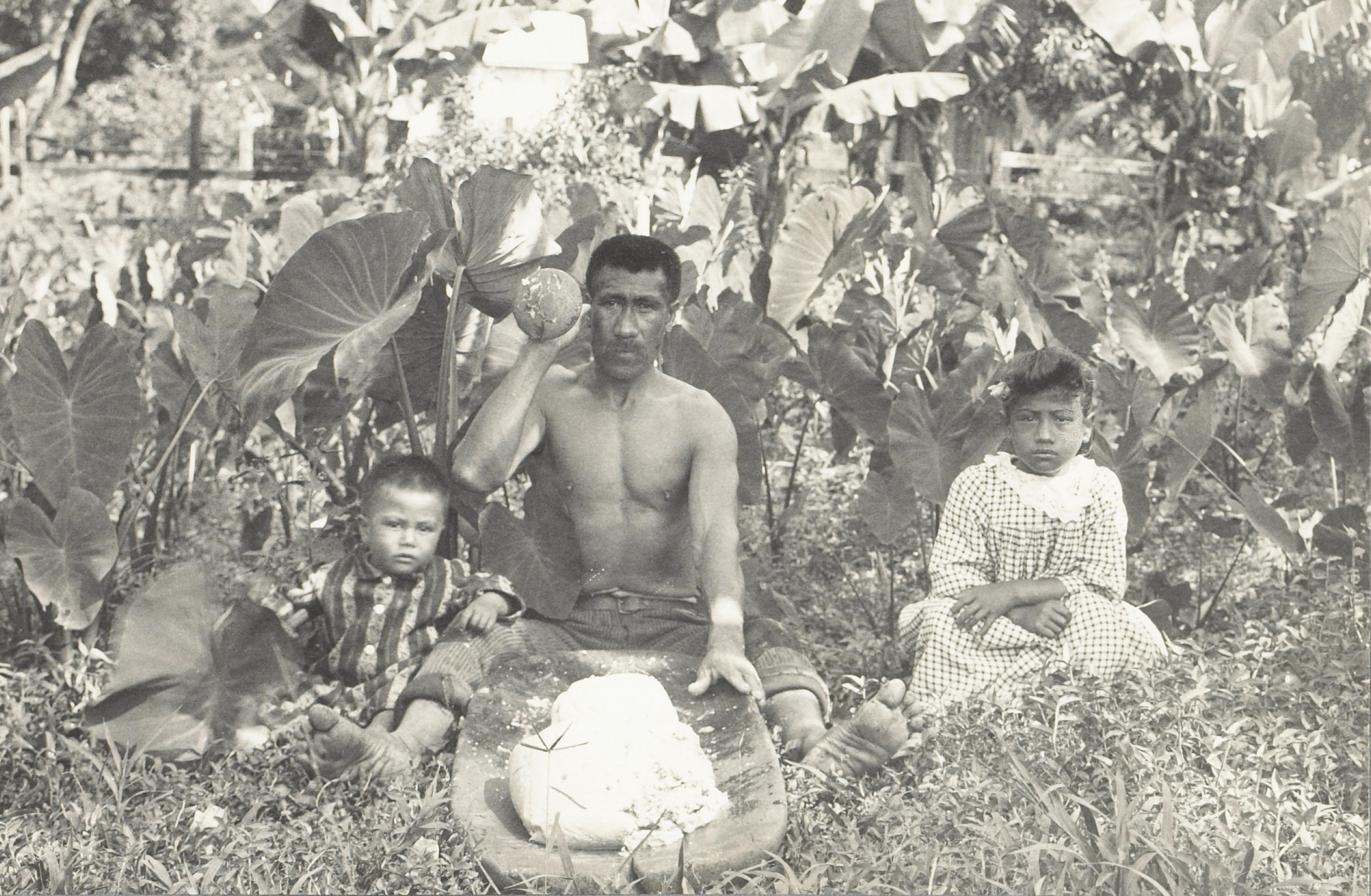
Hawaiian man pounding taro to make poi. Taro plants can be seen growing behind him

In 1778, Captain James Cook arrived at the island of Niihau, leaving a ram goat, ewes, a boar, an English sow, and seeds for melons, pumpkins, and onions. In 1793, Captain George Vancouver brought the first cattle to the islands; longhorns from California were presented to King Kamehameha I.

With no natural predators, the new cattle multiplied out of control; the king hired an American man named John Parker to capture and domesticate cattle. Many of the cattle were butchered and beef was introduced to Hawaiian cuisine.

In 1813, pineapple was first cultivated in Honolulu by Don Francisco de Paula Marin, a Spanish botanist and advisor to King Kamehameha I.

Although grape vines were introduced by Captain Vancouver around 1792, Marin is credited with the first Hawaiian vineyard in 1815 and planting the now rare Mission grape variety. Marin also brewed the first beer in 1812, and planted the first coffee crop in 1817, but his plantings failed. Marin, called "Manini" by the Hawaiians, experimented with planting oranges, limes, beans, cabbages, potatoes, peaches, melons, maize and lettuce.

By the late 19th century, pineapple and sugarcane plantations owned and run by American settlers took over much of Hawaii's land, and these two crops became the most important sources of revenue for the Hawaiian economy.

==== Ethnic foods ====
As the plantations of the Big Five expanded, the demand for labor grew, so the plantation owners hired immigrant workers, which included Chinese, Koreans, Japanese, Filipinos, and Portuguese. Each ethnic group wanted its food in workplaces, and farms and grocery markets were established.

The Chinese immigrants brought Cantonese cuisine, cooking the first stir fry, sweet and sour, and dim sum dishes in the islands, adding their herbs and spices and served with rice. Rice cultivation was often done from reuse of wet taro patches (loʻi), which themselves were the Hawaiians' adaptation of paddy agriculture by their Austronesian ancestors outlasting ancestral knowledge of the rice grain gradually lost during the expansion into the Pacific. Chinese rice growers imported familiar fish varieties from Asia to stock local streams and irrigation ditches.

Korean immigration to Hawaii brought kimchi and built barbecue pits to cook marinated meats. Korean-style bulgogi or boneless meat with moderately sweet garlic sauce and galbi or meat with bones and moderately sweet garlic sauce as well, and another Korean favorite bibimbab or mixed rice with seasoned vegetables, namul, sweet and spicy gochujang and bulgogi topping also became an integral part of Hawaiian cuisine.

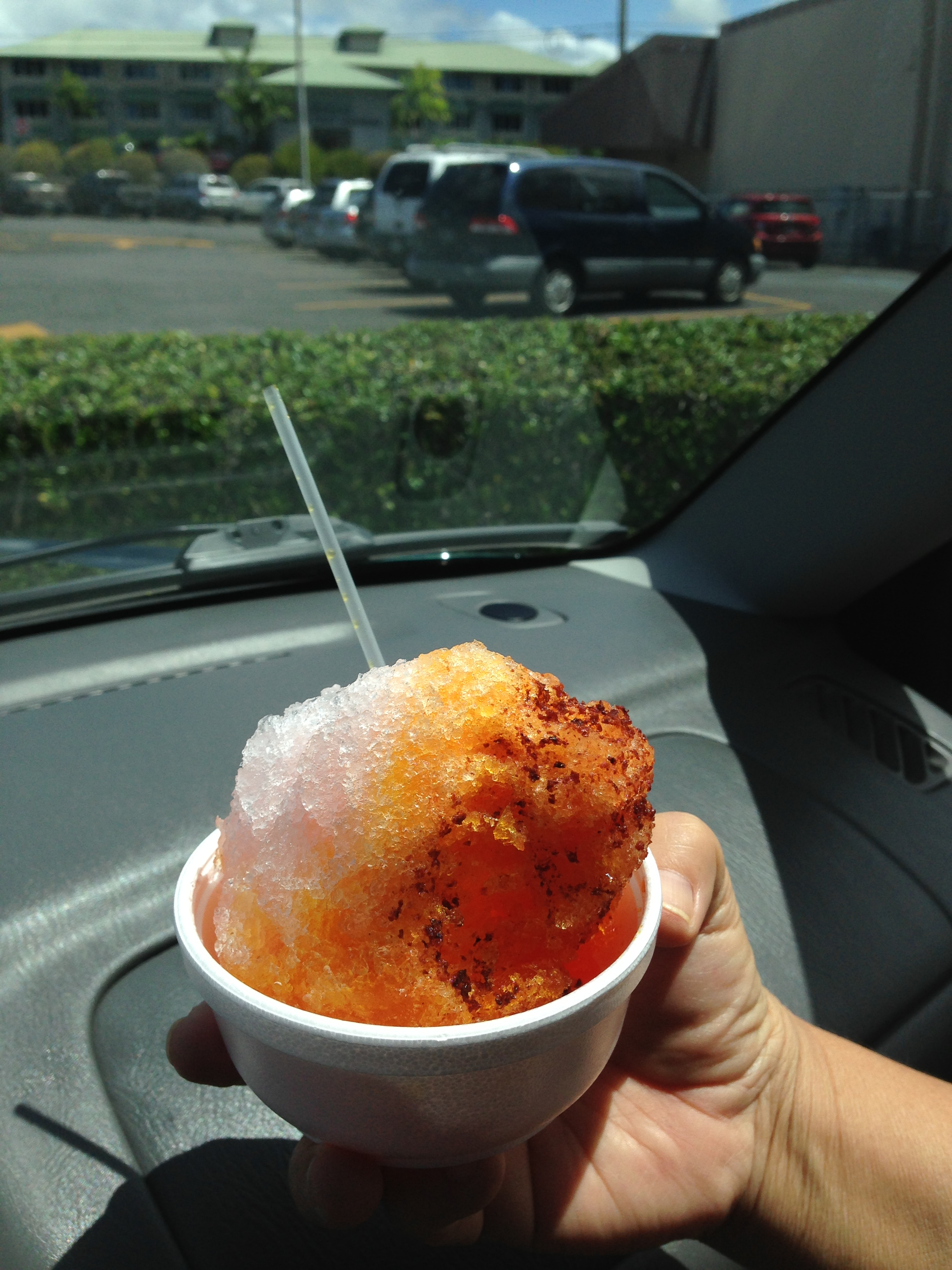
Hawaiian shave ice, believed to have been introduced to Hawaii from Japan by Japanese immigrants who ate kakigōri

The Portuguese immigrants came to Hawaii from the Azores in the late 19th century, introducing their foods with an emphasis on pork, tomatoes and chili peppers, and built forno, their traditional beehive oven, to make pão doce, the Portuguese sweet bread and malasada. Whalers brought in salted fish, which ultimately became lomi-lomi salmon.

The Japanese brought bento and sashimi, and, although many of their vegetable seeds would not grow in the climate of the islands, they succeeded in making tofu and soy sauce. The homes of Japanese immigrants lacked ovens, so their cooking relied on frying, steaming, broiling, and simmering, leading to the popularization of tempura and noodle soups in Hawaii.

By the early 20th century, the Japanese were the largest ethnic group and rice became the third-largest crop in the islands.

Puerto Rican immigration to Hawaii began in 1900, contributing spicy, Spanish-seasoned thick soups, casseroles, pasteles, and meat turnovers.

Filipinos reached Hawaii in 1909, bringing peas and beans, the adobo style of vinegar and garlic dishes, choosing to boil, stew, broil, and fry food instead of baking, and eating sweet potatoes as a staple besides rice.

Samoans arrived in 1919, building their earth ovens above ground instead of below like the imu, and made poi from fruit instead of taro.

After the Vietnam War ended in 1975, immigrants from Southeast Asia arrived, bringing lemongrass, fish sauce and galangal, popular in Thai and Vietnamese cuisine.

=== Territorial period – statehood ===
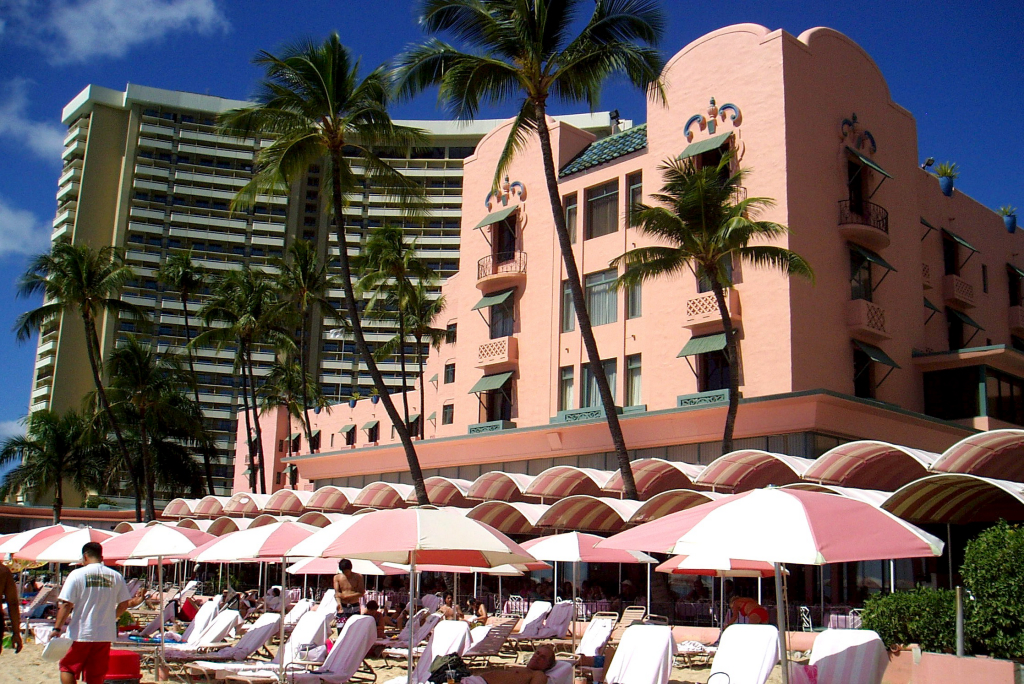
Royal Hawaiian Hotel was one of the first hotels built along the shores of Waikīkī.

The first restaurant in Honolulu was opened in 1849 by a Portuguese man named Peter Fernandez. Situated behind the Bishop & Co. bank, the establishment was known as the "eating house" and was followed by other restaurants, such as Leon Dejean's "Parisian Restaurant" at the corner of Hotel and Fort Streets.

In 1872, the Royal Hawaiian Hotel opened on Hotel Street, and as one of the most refined hotels in the Pacific, catering to wealthy clients. The Royal Hawaiian dining room served dishes on par with the best restaurants in Europe, with an 1874 menu offering dishes such as mullet, spring lamb, chicken with tomatoes, and cabinet pudding.

The massive pineapple industry of Hawaii was born when the "Pineapple King", James Dole, planted pineapples on the island of Oahu in 1901. In 1922, Dole purchased the island of Lanai for a large-scale pineapple production. By 1950, his Hawaiian Pineapple Company was the largest in the world.

In 1905, George R. Carter, Territorial Governor of Hawai'i, promoted increasing local agricultural production, saying that "there was a time when Hawaii supplied California with flour, also potatoes and other vegetables. Now California produces her own and sends part of the surplus here."

Newspaper editorials of the time also questioned why locally-grown guavas were rotting on the ground while agribusiness was planting non-native pineapples in Hawaii. These concerns were not addressed until almost a century later, when the regional cuisine movement began encouraging the food industry to "grow local, buy local, and eat local."

Since the 1970s, pineapples have been grown more cheaply in Southeast Asia, so Hawaiian agriculture has taken a diverse approach, producing a variety of crops, including squash, tomatoes, chili peppers and lettuce.

From 1978 to 1988, chefs who came to Hawaii would avoid Hawaiian-grown ingredients like their European counterparts, preferring to ship everything in from the U.S. mainland, or as far away as Australia, New Zealand, and Europe.

While eating out was not as prevalent as it is now, local eateries began to establish themselves starting in the 1960s. Diners and drive ins served local ethnic foods in addition to the American fare such as Rainbow Drive-in, L&L, Liliha Bakery and Zippy's. Smaller mom-n-pop shops such as saimin houses, convenience stores were common in neighborhood serving pre-set bentos or a la carte items at an okazuya (Japanese "deli"). Some were even mobile, affectionately known as manapua vans selling small dim sum-like treats long before food truck culture became the trend in the 21st century.

Japanese-American baker Robert Taira, came up with a recipe for the Hawaiian version of sweet Portuguese bread in the 1950s. Taira began to commercially produce the bread in Hawaii, and it became successful in Honolulu bakeries and coffee shops, with plant production expanding to California and South Carolina. By the 1980s, Taira's company, King's Hawaiian Bakery, was grossing US$20 million annually.

==== Hawaii regional cuisine ====
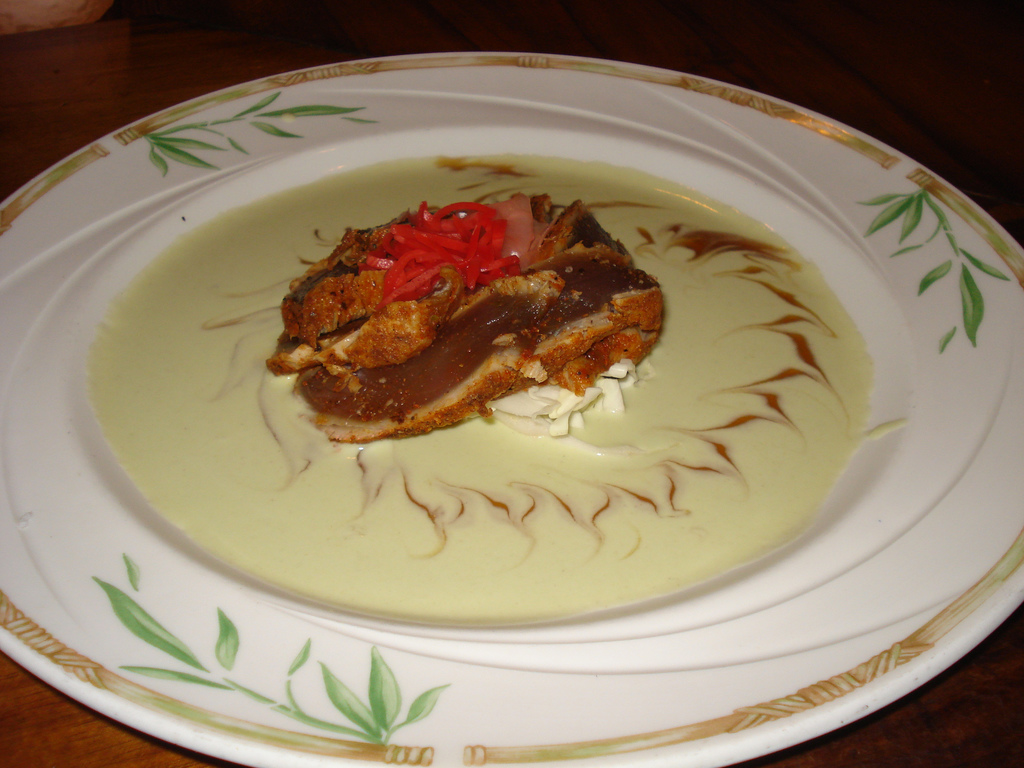
Seared ahi and wasabi beurre blanc sauce

Hawaii regional cuisine refers to a style of cooking and the group of chefs who developed it and advocated for it as a distinct Hawaiian fusion style. The cuisine draws from local ingredients (including seafood, beef and tropical foods), and is a fusion of ethnic culinary influences.

The cuisine style was developed in 1991 by a group of twelve chefs: Sam Choy, Philippe Padovani, Roger Dikon, Gary Strehl, Roy Yamaguchi, Amy Ferguson Ota, Jean-Marie Josselin, George Mavrothalassitis, Beverly Gannon, Peter Merriman, Mark Ellman and Alan Wong.

The development of Hawaii regional cuisine was a coordinated effort to move away from ingredients shipped over long distances and preparations that copied continental recipes even when they were not well suited to conditions in Hawaii. Rather, the group hoped to promote locally sourced ingredients in the hospitality industry while simultaneously informing the world about cuisine in Hawaii.

The goal of the group was to link local ranchers, fishermen and farmers with chefs and business in the hospitality and restaurant industry to develop Hawaii regional cuisine as a reflection of the community.

They took uninspired international and continental hotel cuisine based on imported products and recipes from the mainland and replaced them with dishes and a cuisine based on locally grown foods.

This founding group of chefs worked to publish the 1994 cookbook by Janice Wald Henderson, The New Cuisine of Hawaii. These chefs also sponsored a cookbook to be sold for charity.

== Contemporary times ==
The continued popularity of Hawaii in the 21st century as a tourist destination has helped spawn Hawaiian-themed and Hawaiian cuisine restaurants in the contiguous United States such as Ono Hawaiian BBQ and L&L Hawaiian Barbecue. Its popularity is also reaching Europe, with the restaurant POND Dalston opening in 2014 as first New Hawaiian Cuisine in the United Kingdom. There are also many Hawaiian-made specialties such as Lilikoi açaí bowls from places like Ono Yo on the North Shore of Oahu. There are also branded items such as Mauna Loa macadamia nuts. Sugarcane producer Alexander & Baldwin continues to operate and has diversified into other businesses.

Dole Food Company is based in Hawaii and still has a pineapple operation on Oahu. Maui Land & Pineapple Company ceased production in 2009. Some of its assets and employees are involved in the Haliʻimaile Pineapple Company startup and Kapalua Farms organic pineapple operation was taken over by Ulupono Sustainable Agriculture Development with backing from Pierre Omidyar. Beer producer Kona Brewing Company and the Volcano Winery are active.

Local eateries include the Zippy's chain. Foodland Hawaii is a grocery chain. There are also distinctive and historic business operations such as Kanemitsu Bakery, Helena's Hawaiian Food, Common Ground Kauai, Anna Miller's, Nisshodo Candy Store, Maui Tacos and Waiʻoli Tea Room & Bakery at Salvation Army Waiʻoli Tea Room.

Roy Yamaguchi's Roy's and various cookbooks promoting Hawaiian regional cuisine have also helped popularize Hawaiian cuisine and Hawaiian fusion cuisine.

== Ingredients ==
=== Vegetables, fruits and nuts ===
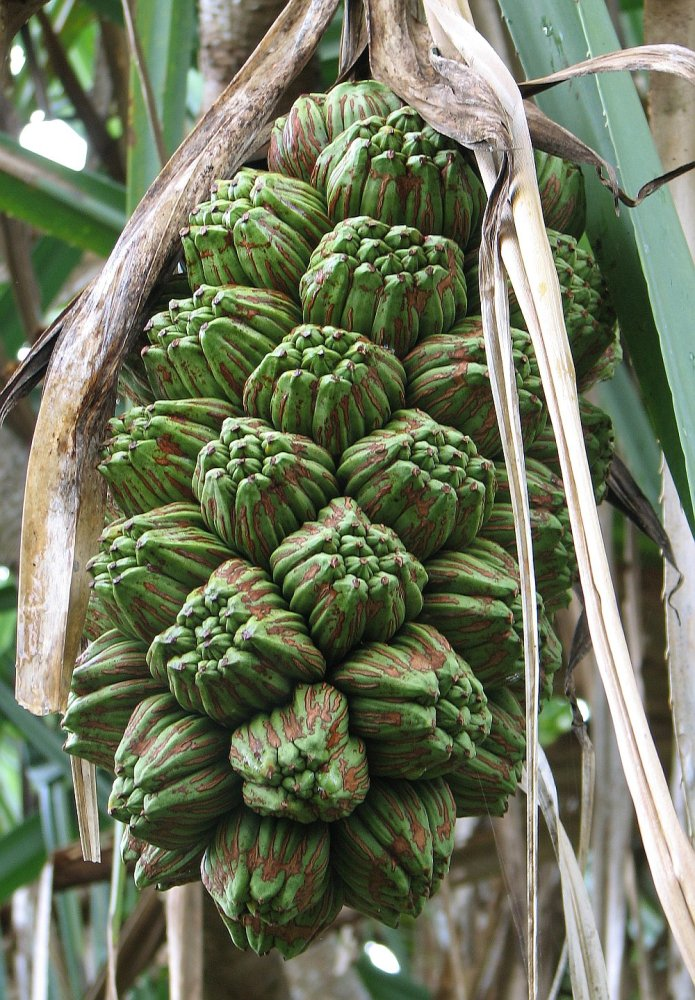
Hala, the fruit of the Pandanus tectorius tree

- Taro (Colocasia esculenta)—a popular and ancient plant that has been harvested for at least 30,000 years by indigenous people in New Guinea. There are hundreds of varieties of taro, and the corm of the wetland variety makes the best poi, as well as taro starch or flour. The dry-land variety has a crispy texture and is used for making taro chips. The smaller American variety is used for stewed dishes.
- Breadfruit (Artocarpus altilis)
- Sweet potatoes
- Candle nut (Aleurites moluccana) or kukui—roasted kernels traditionally used as candles, main ingredient in the ancient Hawaiian condiment, 'inamona
- Coconut (Cocos nucifera)
- Polynesian arrowroot (Tacca leontopetaloides) or pia plant—cooked arrowroot is mixed with papaya, banana, or pumpkin in baked desserts; haupia, a Hawaiian coconut cream pudding, uses it as a thickener.
- Ti (Cordyline fruticosa)—after distillation came to Hawaii, the root of the ti was turned into liquor called ʻōkolehao. The leaves are used as a wrapper for food cooked in the imu earth oven, such as laulau.
- Winged bean (Psophocarpus tetragonolobus)
- Jicama

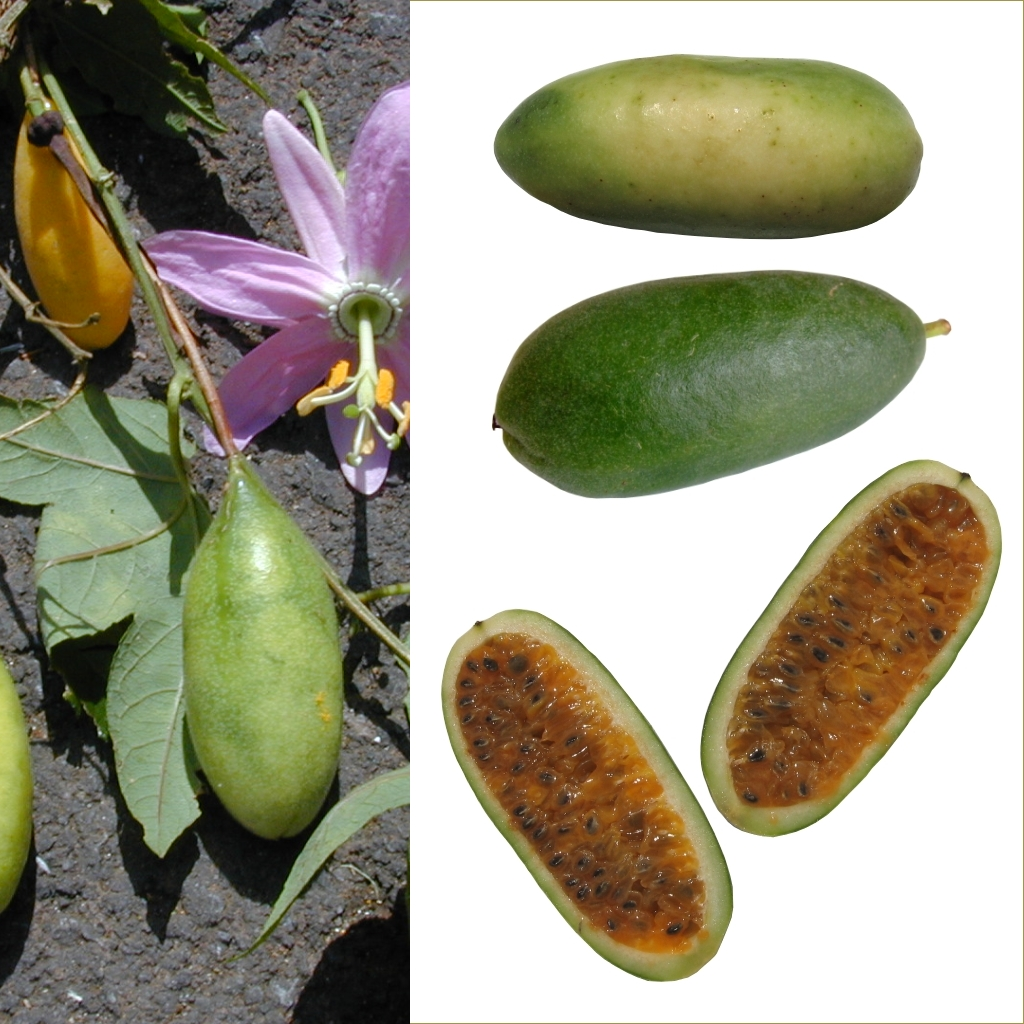
Curuba from Hawaii

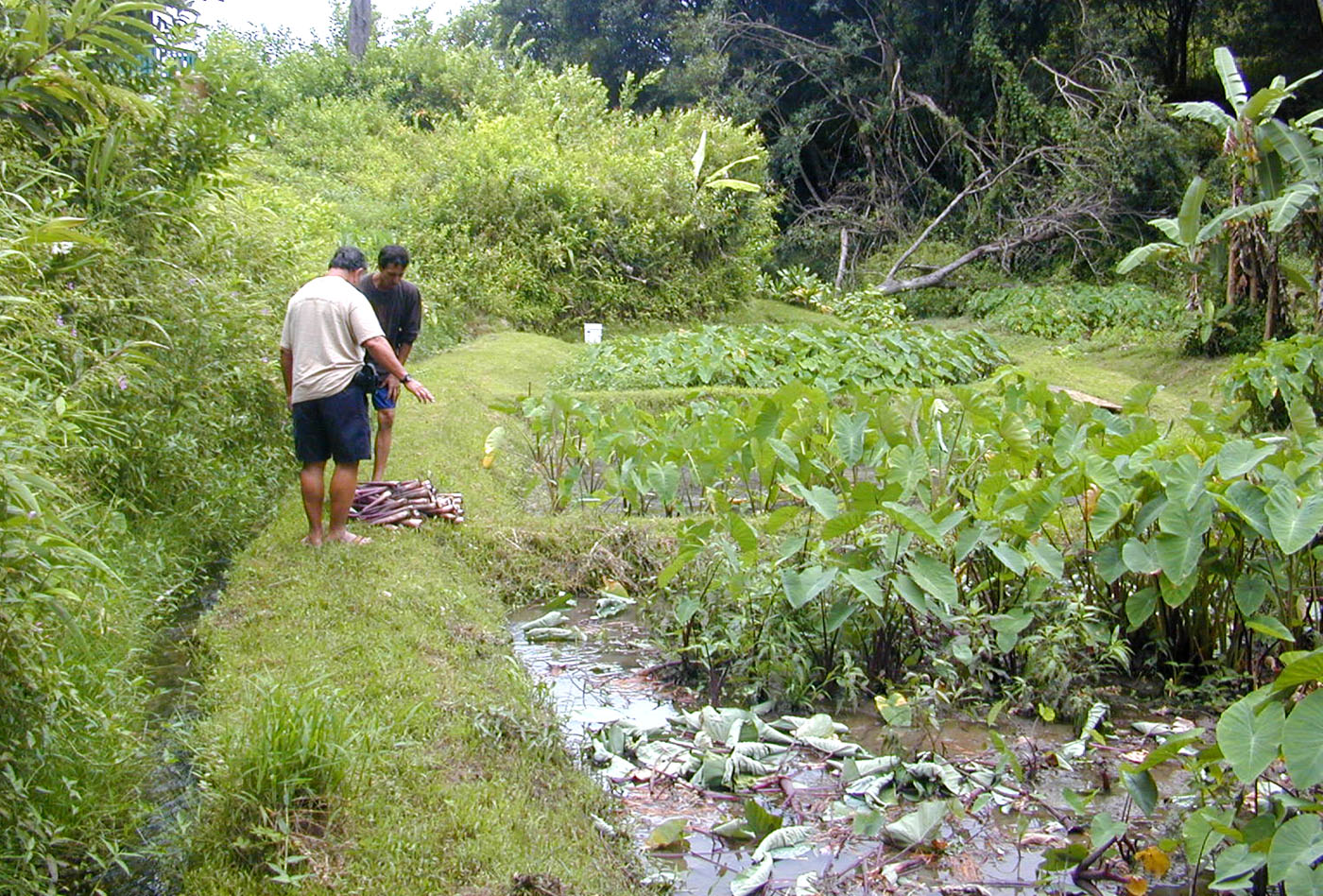
A kalo lo'i harvest in Maunawili Valley. A lo'i is an irrigated, wetland terrace, or paddy, used to grow kalo (taro) or rice. Ancient Hawaiians developed a sophisticated farming system for kalo, along with over 300 variations of the plant adapted to different growing conditions.

- Avocado
- Banana
- Bittermelon
- Breadfruit
- Carambola or "star fruit"
- Cassava
- Chico
- Chili peppers
- Coconut
- Corn
- Curuba
- Custard apple
- Daikon
- Dragon fruit
- Fig
- Fiddlehead fern
- Grape
- Guava
- Herbs
- Lemon
- Lettuce
- Lime
- Longan
- Lychee
- Mango
- Mangosteen
- Marungay
- Mountain apple not to be confused with rose apple
- 'Ōhelo berries
- Maui onion
- Orange
- Papaya
- Passion fruit known as liliko'i (or lilikoi)
- Persimmon
- Poha
- Pineapple
- Pomelo known widely as jabong
- Rice - Although no longer widely cultivated, it was an important crop in the mid-1800s, its importance sometimes replaced taro paddies
- Soursop
- Squash and melons, including watermelon
- Strawberry
- Surinam Cherry
- Sweet potato or ʻuala from cultivars introduced via ancient Polynesian voyages; and contemporary introductions like Okinawan
- Tamarind
- Watercress
- Winged bean
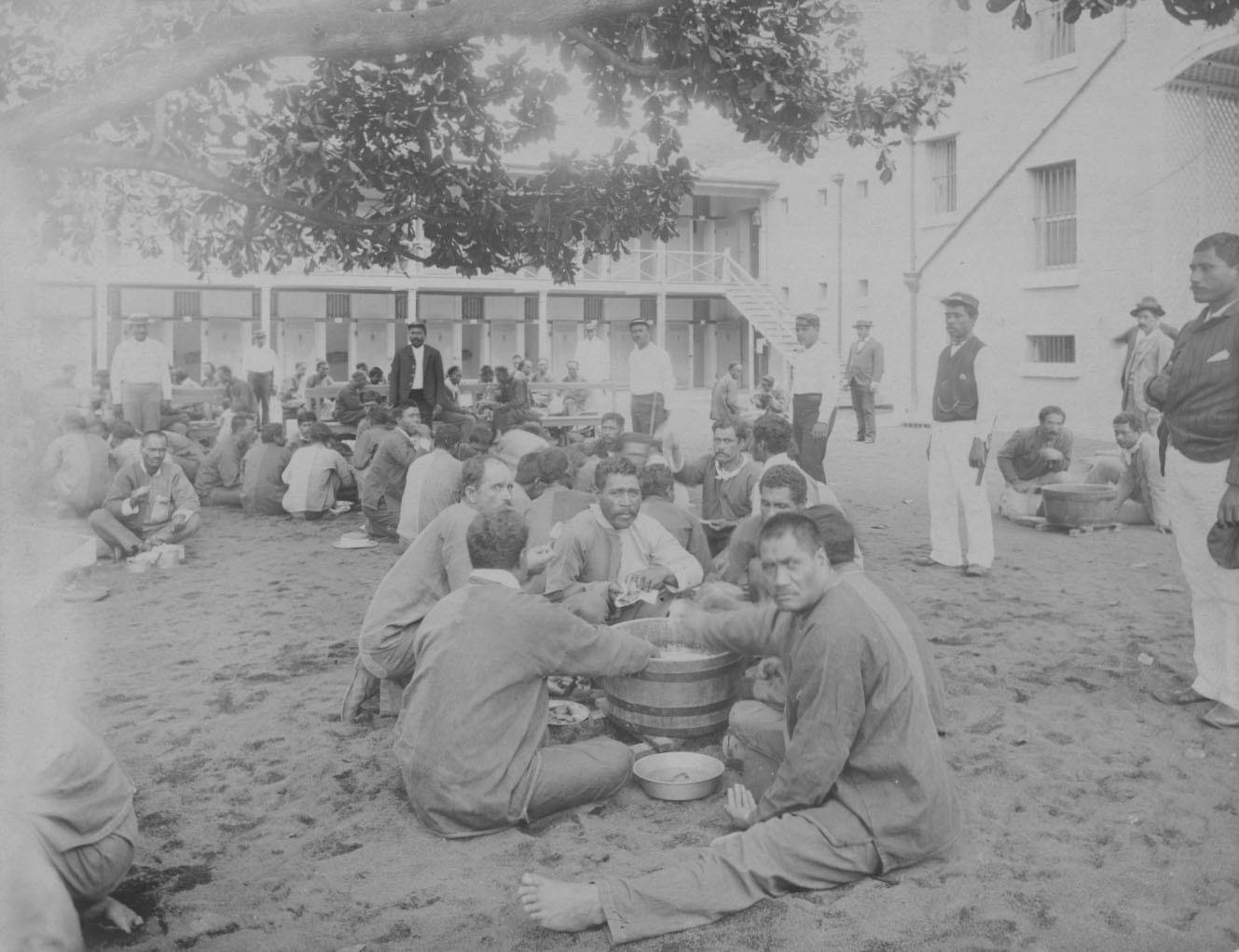
Prison inmates on Oʻahu eating poi circa 1890

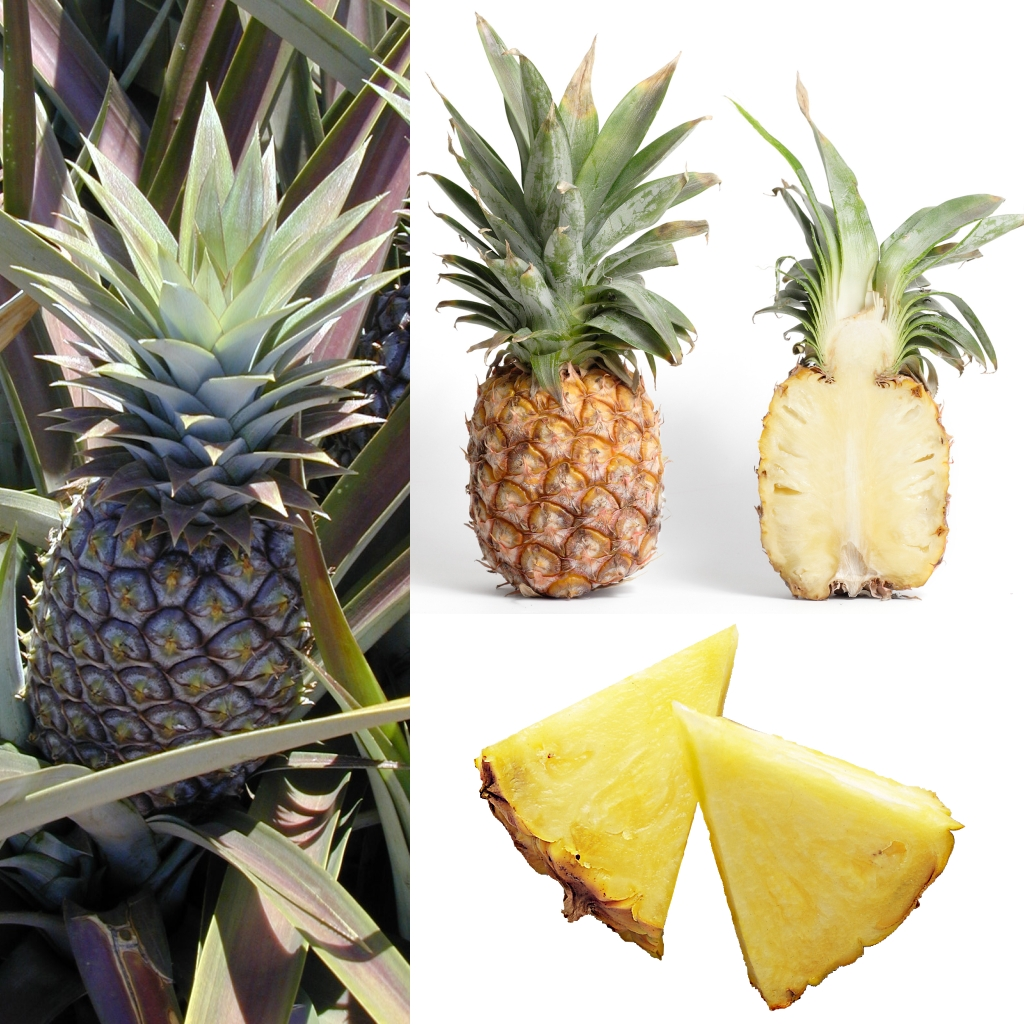
Pineapple from Maui

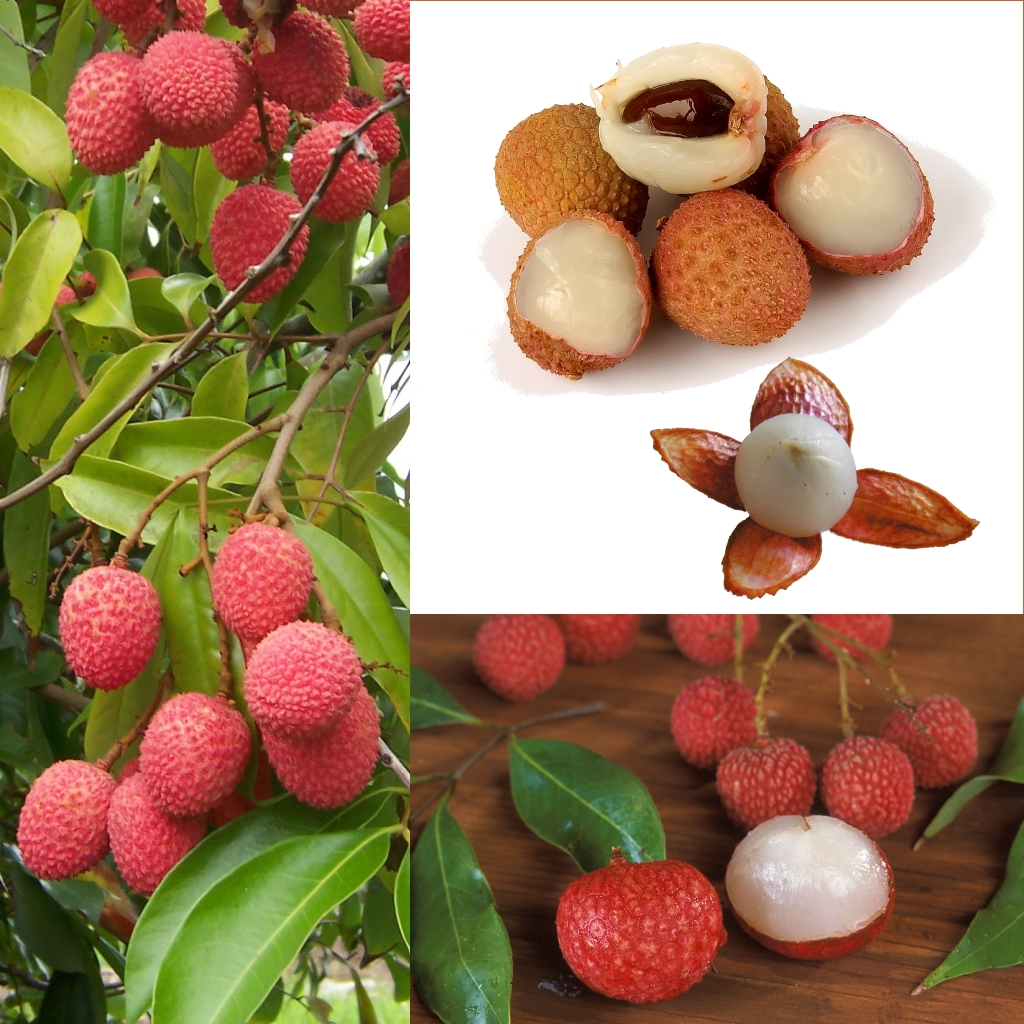
Lychee, introduced to Hawaii about 100 years ago

=== Spam ===
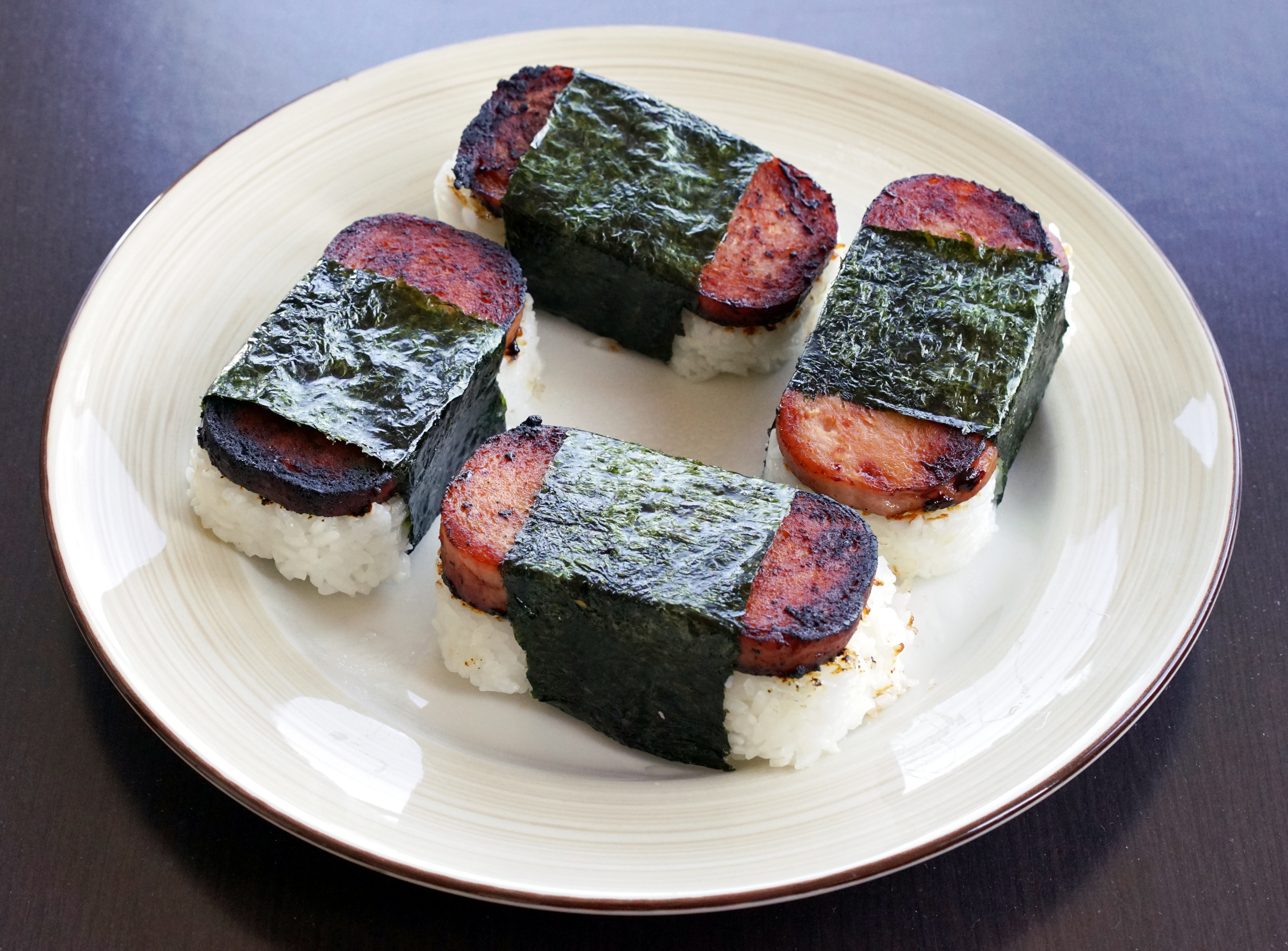
Spam musubi, a fusion of Japanese onigiri using fried Spam. Spam was brought to Hawaii during World War II and popularized on the islands, with spam musubi appearing in the 1980s

The Hormel company's canned meat product Spam has been highly popular in Hawaii for decades. Per capita, Hawaiians are the second largest consumers of Spam in the world, right behind Guam. Originally brought to Hawaii by American servicemen in their rations, Spam became an important source of protein for locals after fishing around the islands was prohibited during World War II. In 2005, Hawaiians consumed more than five million cans of Spam.

Spam is used in local dishes in a variety of ways, most commonly fried and served with rice. For breakfast, fried eggs are often served with spam. Spam can also be wrapped in ti and roasted, skewered and deep fried, or stir fried with cabbage.

It is added to saimin and fried rice, mashed with tofu, or served with cold sōmen or baked macaroni and cheese.

It is also used in chutney for pupus, in sandwiches with mayonnaise, or baked with guava jelly. Spam musubi, a slice of fried Spam upon a bed of rice wrapped with a strip of nori, is a popular snack in Hawaii which found its way onto island sushi menus in the 1980s.

=== Beef ===
In the 19th century, John Parker brought over Mexican cowboys to train the Hawaiians in cattle ranching. The Hawaiian cowboys of Kamuela and Kula came to be called paniolos.

Cattle ranching grew rapidly for the next 100 years. In 1960, half of the land in Hawaii was devoted to ranching for beef export, but by 1990 the number had shrunk to 25 percent. The paniolos chewed pipikaula ("beef rope"), a salted and dried beef that resembles beef jerky. Pipikaula would usually be broiled before serving. With the influence of Asian cooking, beef strips are commonly marinated in soy sauce.

When beef is dried in the sun, a screened box is traditionally used to keep the meat from dust and flies. Dried meat could often be found as a relish or appetizer at a lū‘au.

=== Fish and seafood ===
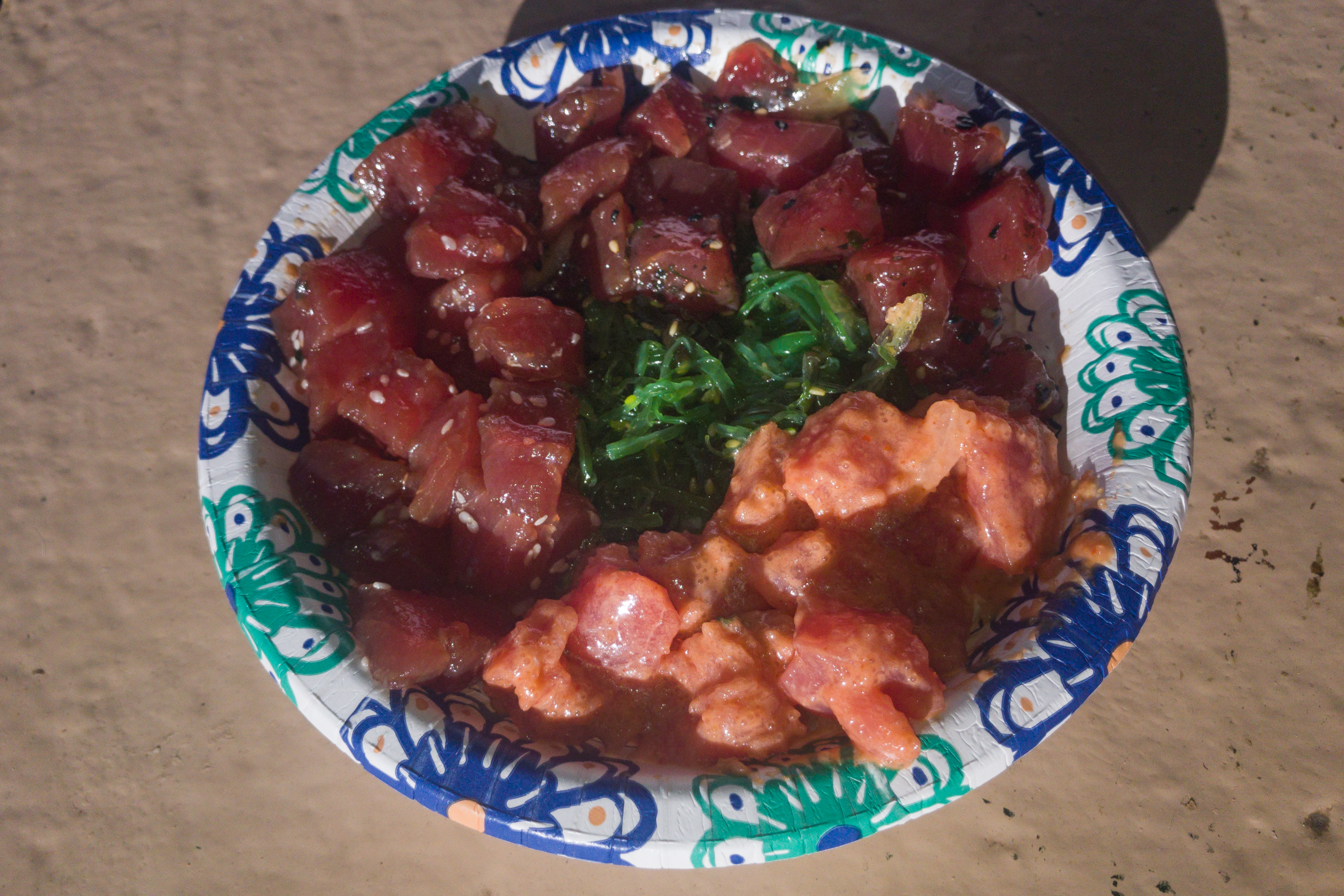
Poke bowl, Maui, Hawaii

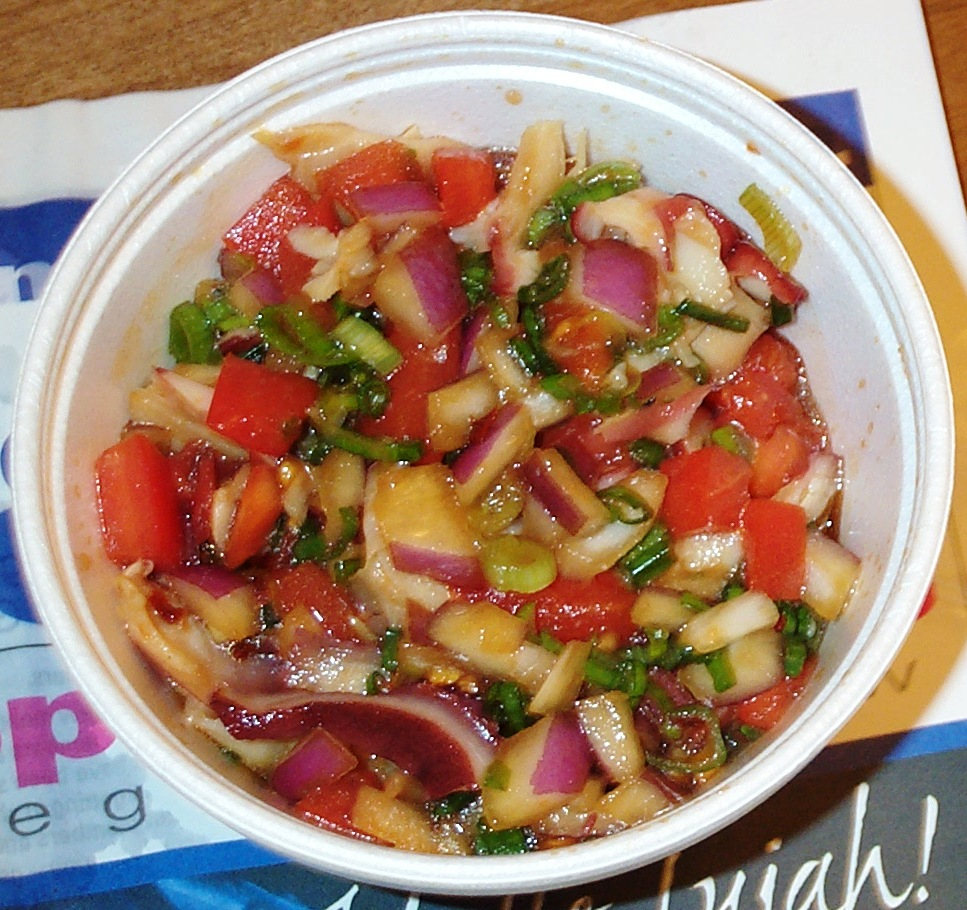
Tako (octopus) poke with tomatoes, green onion, maui onion, soy sauce, sesame oil, sea salt, chili pepper

Tuna is the most important fish in Hawaiian cuisine. Varieties include the skipjack tuna (aku), the yellowfin tuna (ahi), and the albacore tuna (tombo).

Ahi in particular has a long history, since ancient Hawaiians used it on long ocean voyages because it is well preserved when salted and dried. A large portion of the local tuna fishery goes to Japan to be sold for sashimi. Tuna is eaten as sashimi in Hawaii as well, but is also grilled or sautéed, or made into poke.

The Pacific blue marlin (kajiki) is barbecued or grilled at high temperatures, but for a relatively short period of time to avoid overcooking due to its very low fat content. The broadbill swordfish (shutome), popular and shipped all over the mainland United States, is high in fat and its steaks may be grilled, broiled, or used in stir-fries. The groupers (hapuu) are most often steamed. The red snapper (onaga) is steamed, poached, or baked. The pink snapper (opakapaka) has a higher fat, and is steamed or baked, served with a light sauce. The wahoo (ono) is grilled or sautéed, and the dolphin fish (mahimahi) is usually cut into steaks and fried or grilled. The moonfish (opah) is used for broiling, smoking, or making sashimi.

Poke is a local cuisine that originally involved preserving raw fish or other seafood such as octopus with sea salt and rubbing it (lomi) with seasonings or cutting it into small pieces. Seasonings made of seaweed, kukui nut, and sea salt were traditionally used for the Hawaiian poke.

Since first contact with Western and Asian cultures, scallions, chili peppers, and soy sauce have become common additions to it.

Poke is different from sashimi, since the former is usually rough-cut and piled onto a plate, and can be made with less expensive pieces of fish.

During the early 1970s, poke became an appetizer to have with beer or to bring to a party.

=== Spices ===
Showing the island's Asian influence, common Asian spices include five-spice powder from China, wasabi and shoyu (soy sauce) from Japan, and bagoong from the Philippines.

== Dishes ==
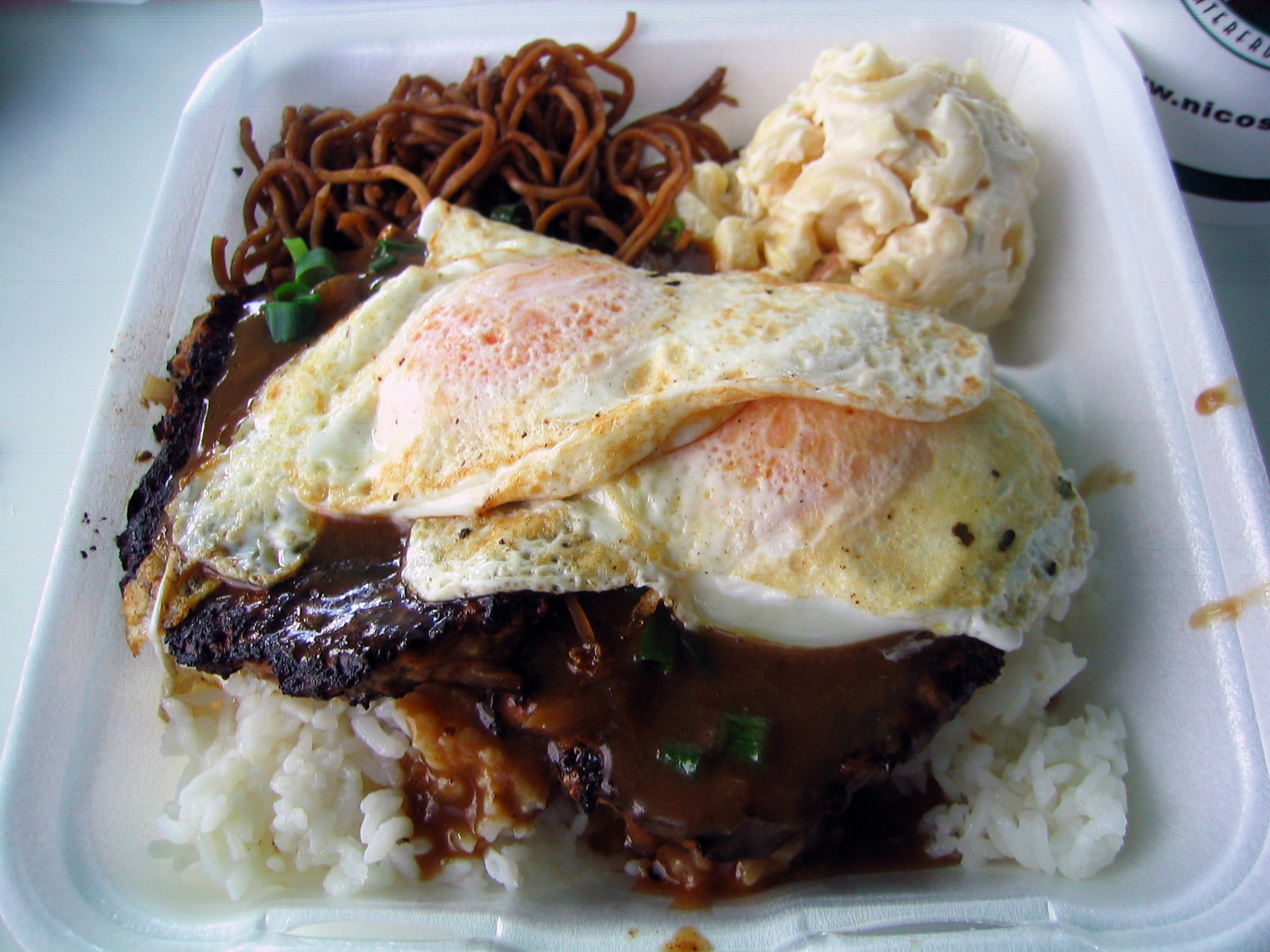
A loco moco plate lunch, with fried saimin and macaroni salad

The local cuisine of Hawaii reflects the archipelago's history of migration and cultural exchange. Staple elements include both indigenous and introduced crops. Plants like taro, are used to prepare poi, a smooth puree made from the taro corm. Taro leaves are also featured in luau, a dish consisting of taro leaves stewed in coconut milk or cream. Taro or tī leaves are also used in preparing Lau lau, where pieces of pork and salted black cod are encased in taro and tī leaves before cooking, though modern variations may incorporate other proteins such as fish, chicken, or beef.

Seafood is used frequently in local dishes like lomi salmon, which combines cubed salt-cured salmon with fresh tomatoes and onions, as well as opihi (edible local limpets like Cellana sandwicensis and Cellana exarata). The plate lunch (Hawaiian: pā mea ʻai) is typical comfort food alongside dishes like loco moco, which feature a hamburger steak positioned over rice and topped with brown gravy and eggs.

Influences from various waves of immigration are visible through adapted Chinese, Portuguese, Japanese, and Puerto Rican dishes.

Chinese dishes like Chicken long rice have been adapted, a dish of chicken stewed with ginger, green onions, and clear rice vermicelli or mung bean thread. Similarly, manapua adapts the traditional Chinese cha siu bao into a version two to three times larger, expanding beyond the classic pork filling to include lup cheong, Okinawan sweet potatoes, or chicken curry. The influence of Chinese preservation techniques is also evident in crack seed, a popular category of snack consisting of Chinese-style preserved fruits.

Japanese traditions heavily shape local quick snack options like onigiri and Spam musubi, which are rice balls often topped with cured meats such as Spam musubi, hot dogs, or Göteborg musubi. For a hot noodle option, Saimin is a local noodle soup consisting of soft wheat egg noodles served in a hot dashi broth, typically garnished with green onions, kamaboko, and char siu.

Sweets and baked goods draw heavily from Portuguese and Japanese confectionery. The Portuguese contribution can be seen in dishes such as Portuguese sweet bread and malasadas, which are chewy, deep-fried donuts coated in sugar. Japanese sweet traditions are represented by various forms of Mochi, a confection made from glutinous rice. Additionally, pasteles were inspired by Puerto Rican cuisine.

For large gatherings and celebrations, the traditional Polynesian-inspired Kālua pig is often cooked in an imu (underground oven) creating a smoky pulled pork. It is sometimes cooked alongside cabbage.

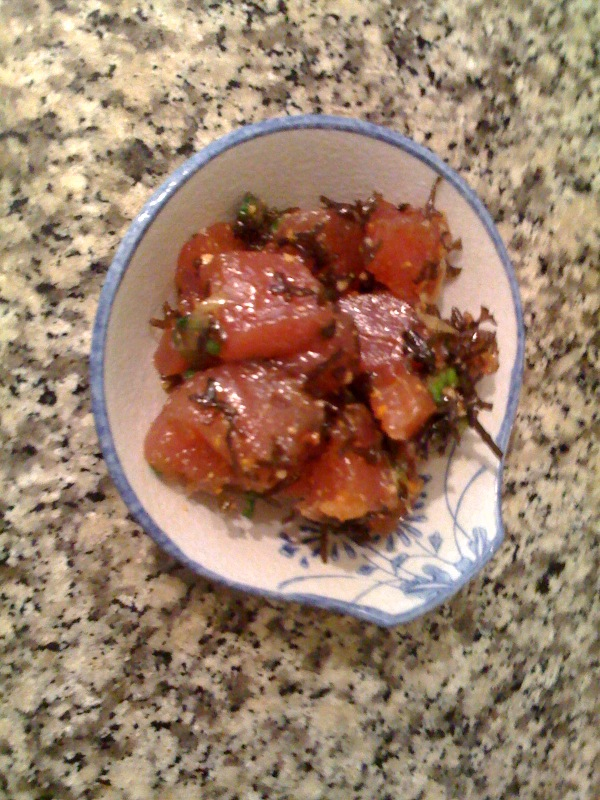
Ahi tuna limu (seaweed) ahi poke

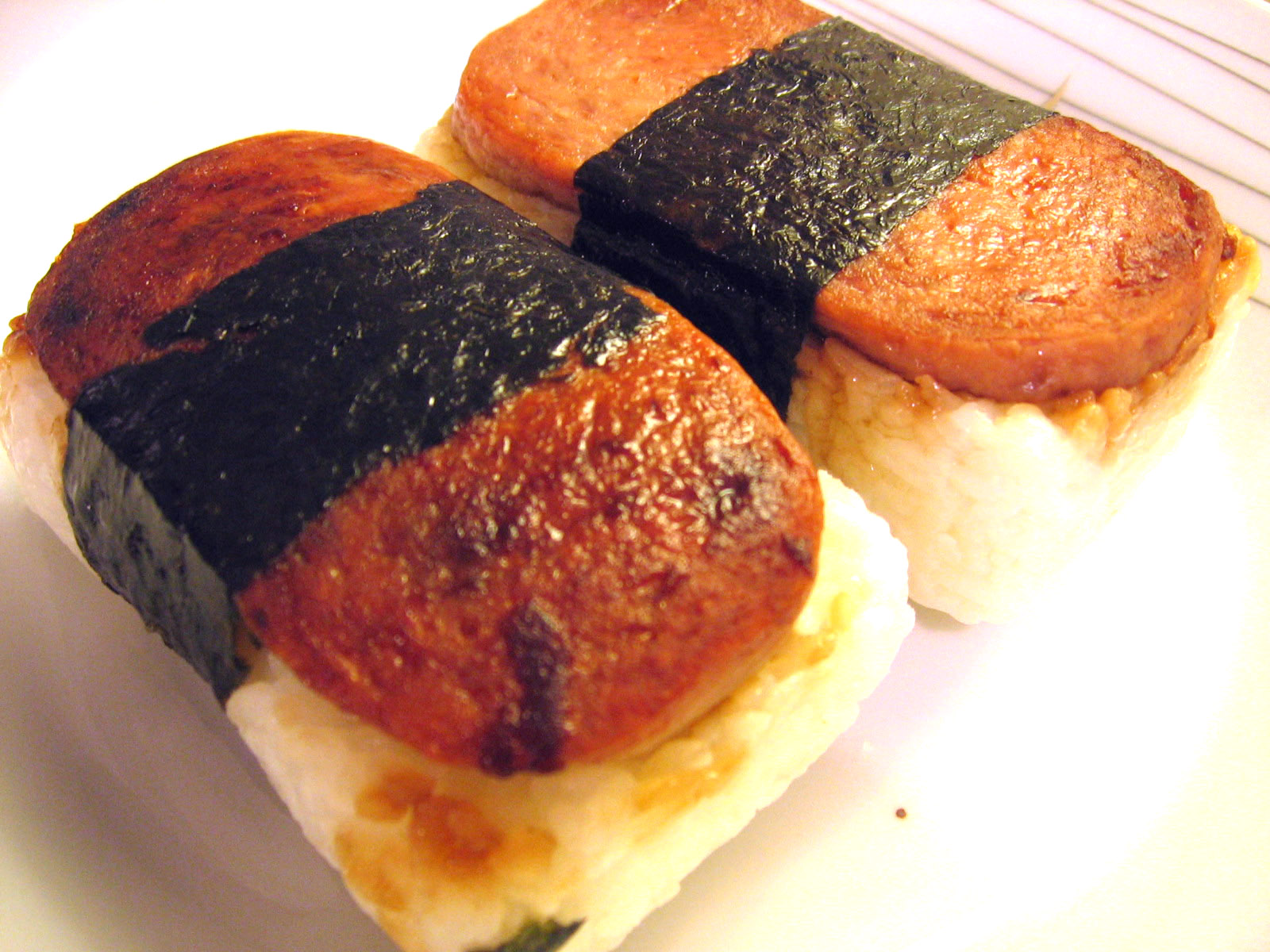
Spam musubi

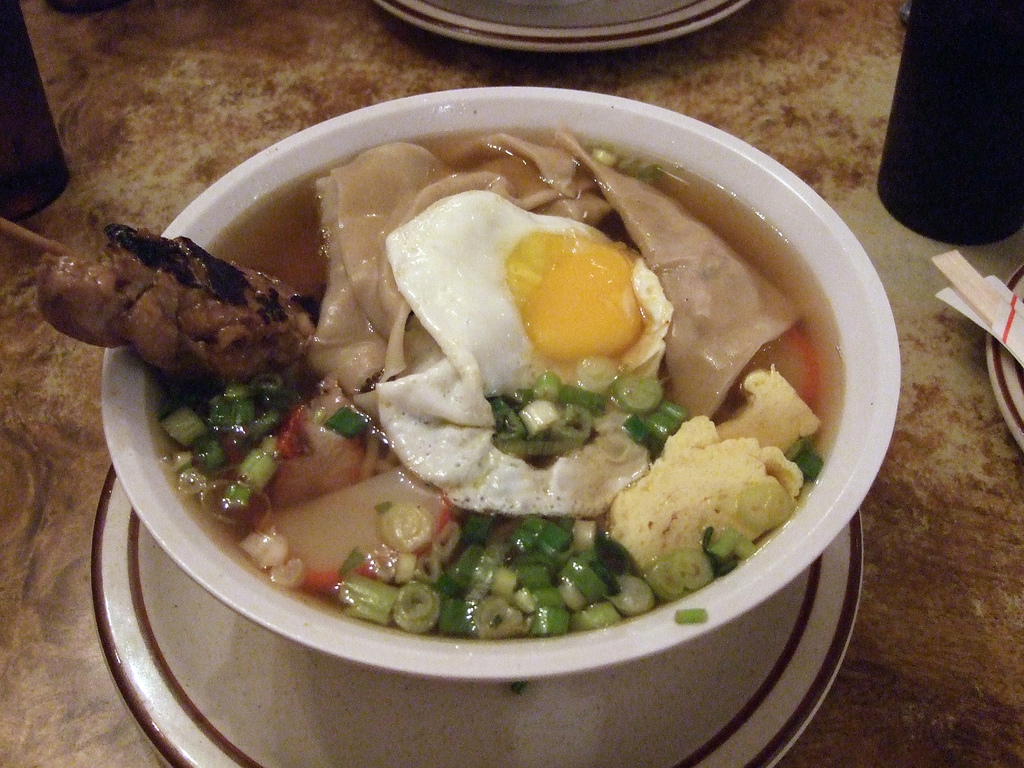
Wonton saimin

== Drinks ==
- Kava (Piper methysticum) (ʻawa) is a traditional soporific beverage of Oceania thought to have originated in Vanuatu. In modern times, kava bars have experienced some popularity in Hawaii, with commercial kava plantations on Maui, Molokai, Kauai, and Oahu.

=== Alcoholic beverages ===
- Hawaiian tropical tiki cocktails like the Blue Hawaii make use of rum. The rum is blended with a variety of tropical fruit juices and served with a decorative piece of fruit.
- Okolehao is an old Hawaiian liquor distilled from the fermented root of the ti plant.
- Hawaiian wine is produced mostly on the island of Maui and the island of Hawaii.
- Hawaiian beer is represented by the largest brewpub in the state, Kona Brewing Company. From 1901 to 1998, "Primo" was one of the most popular Hawaiian beers, and as of 2008, has returned to production, though it is now brewed in California.

Historically, craft beers (microbrews) have been slow to take off in Hawaii due to a restrictive state law on brewpub sales. However, the law changed in 2003, and growlers are now available. The Maui Brewing Co. is the largest Hawaiian packaged beer brewer. (See also List of breweries in Hawaii).

== See also ==
- List of American regional and fusion cuisines
- Oceanic cuisine

== Notes ==
a. Food historian Rachel Laudan (1996) on four distinct types of food plus a new, fifth type known as "Hawaiian Regional Cuisine" (HRC) that began in 1991. Because HRC was so new at the time of Laudan's book, she only briefly touches upon it: "I came to understand that what people in Hawaii eat is a mixture of four distinct kinds of food, introduced at distinct periods, but now all coexisting. The first three reflect the three diasporas that have terminated in Hawaii: the great marine diaspora of the Pacific Islanders that probably reached the Hawaiian Islands sometime in the third century A.D..; the European voyages of discovery that finally came upon the Islands in the late eighteenth century; and the long migration of the Chinese, Japanese, Portuguese, Koreans, Filipinos, and lately, Southeast Asians, most of whom came to work on the plantations. From these diverse traditions, a fourth, an East-West-Pacific food, is now being created, known in the Islands as Local Food. [...] But there is another cuisine in the Islands that attracts attention, Hawaii Regional Cuisine...[it] was created by forces quite different from those that drive Local Food...although the forces creating Hawaii Regional Cuisine and Local Food were different, their current cross-fertilization can be nothing but mutually beneficial, creating a firm regional base for the cuisine of the restaurants and increasing sophistication for the cuisine of the home and the street."

b. The early settlement history of Hawaiʻi is not completely resolved. One theory is that the first Polynesians arrived in Hawaiʻi in the third century from the Marquesas and were followed by Tahitian settlers in 1300 AD who conquered the original inhabitants. Another is that there was an extended period of contact but not necessarily for a Tahitian invasion.

c. Men and women ate their meals separately to preserve the distinction between male and female mana, which was thought to be blurred by both sexes handling the same food. In addition, some foods were forbidden to women, such as pork, certain kinds of fish and most types of bananas.

== Bibliography ==
- Adams, Wanda A. (2006), The Island Plate: 150 Years of Recipes and Food Lore from the Honolulu Advertiser, Waipahu, Hawaiʻi: Island Heritage Publishing, archived from the original on 23 February 2020.
- Adams, Wanda A. (28 November 2007), "Cheers to cooking with beer", Taste, The Honolulu Advertiser, pp. 3E.
- Barnes, Phil (1999), A Concise History of the Hawaiian Islands, Petroglyph Press, ISBN 0-912180-56-0.
- Paul, Robert E.; Chen, Ching-Cheng (2003), "Postharvest Physiology, Handling and Storage of Pineapple", in Bartholomew, Robert E. (ed.), The Pineapple: Botany, Production and Uses, CABI Publishing, p. 253, ISBN 0-85199-503-9.
- Brennan, Jennifer (2000), Tradewinds & Coconuts: A Reminiscence & Recipes from the Pacific Islands, Periplus, ISBN 962-593-819-2.
- Choy, Sam (1999), Sam Choy's Poke: Hawaiʻi's Soul Food, Honolulu, Hawaii: Mutual Publishing, ISBN 1-56647-253-9.
- Choy, Sam; Cook, Lynn (2003), Sam Choy & the Makaha Sons' A Hawaiian Lū'au, Mutual Publishing, ISBN 1-56647-573-2.
- Corum, Ann Kondo (2000), Ethnic Foods of Hawaiʻi, The Bess Press, ISBN 1-57306-117-4.
- Gabaccia, Donna R. (2000), We Are What We Eat: Ethnic Food and the Making of Americans, Harvard University Press, ISBN 0-674-00190-7.
- HRHAS, (Honolulu Royal Hawaiian Agricultural Society) (1850), Transactions of the Royal Hawaiian Agricultural Society, vol. 1, Honolulu, HI: Henry M. Whitney, pp. 45–46.
- Henderson, Janice Wald (1994), The New Cuisine of Hawaii: Recipes from the Twelve Celebrated Chefs of Hawaii Regional Cuisine, New York: Villard Books, ISBN 0-679-42529-2.
- Kamakau, Samuel M. (1992), The Works of the People of Old, Honolulu, HI: Bishop Museum Press, ISBN 0-910240-18-3.
- Kane, Herb Kawainui (1998), Ancient Hawaii, Kawainui Press, ISBN 0-943357-03-9.
- Kirch, Patrick Vinton (2001), On the Road of the Winds: an Archaeological History of the Pacific Islands Before European Contact, University of California Press, ISBN 0-520-23461-8.
- Kulick, Don; Meneley, Anne (2005), "Spam in History", Fat: the Anthropology of an Obsession, Tarcher, ISBN 1-58542-386-6.
- Laudan, Rachel (1996), The Food of Paradise: Exploring Hawaii's Culinary Heritage, Seattle: University of Hawaiʻi Press, ISBN 0-8248-1778-8, archived from the original on 22 August 2016.
- Long, Lucy M. (2003), Culinary Tourism, University Press of Kentucky, ISBN 0-8131-2292-9.
- Loomis, Ilima (2006), Rough Riders: Hawaii's Paniolo and Their Stories, Island Heritage Publishing, ISBN 1-59700-017-5.
- MacCaughey, Vaughan (1918), Shreve, Forrest (ed.), "The Native Bananas of the Hawaiian Islands", The Plant World, 21, Baltimore, MD: Plant World Association, Wild Flower Preservation Society: 1–12.
- Malo, David (2005), Hawaiian Antiquities, Honolulu, HI: Bishop Museum Press, ISBN 0-910240-15-9.
- Miller, Cary D.; Bazore, Katherine; Robbins, Ruth C. (2002), Some Fruits of Hawaii: Their Composition, Nutritive Value and Use in Tested Recipes, University Press of the Pacific, ISBN 1-4102-0347-6.
- Miller, Sally M.; Latham, A.J.H; Flynn, Dennis Owen (1998), Studies in the Economic History of the Pacific Rim, Routledge, ISBN 0-415-14819-7.
- Nenes, Michael F. (2007), "Cuisine of Hawaii", American Regional Cuisine, Wiley, ISBN 978-0-471-68294-3.
- Philpotts, Kaui (2004), Great Chefs of Hawaiʻi, Honolulu, Hawaii: Mutual Publishing, ISBN 1-56647-595-3.
- Piianaia, Nancy (September 2007), "Poke: Hawai'i's "Numbah One" Choice", Waimea Gazette, archived from the original on 3 March 2016.
- Pollock, Nancy J. (April 1986), "Food Classification in Three Pacific Societies: Fiji, Hawaii, and Tahiti", Ethnology, 25 (2), University of Pittsburgh: 107–117, doi:10.2307/3773663, JSTOR 3773663.
- Pukui, Mary Kawena; Elbert, Samuel H. (1986), Hawaiian Dictionary, Honolulu: University of Hawai‘i Press, ISBN 0-8248-0703-0.
- Rea, Pat; Ting, Regina (1991), A Hundred Years of Island Cooking, Hawaiian Electric Company.
- Salama, Toni (2 December 2007), "A little Hilo history", The Seattle Times, archived from the original on 5 December 2007.
- Schindler, Roana; Schindler, Gene (1981), Hawaiian Cookbook, Dover Publications, ISBN 0-486-24185-8.
- Schwabe, Calvin, W. (1979), Unmentionable Cuisine, University Press of Virginia, ISBN 0-8139-1162-1.
- Shintani, Terry (1999), Hawaii Diet, Atria, ISBN 0-671-02666-6.
- Tabrah, Ruth M. (1984), Hawaii: A History, W. W. Norton & Company, ISBN 0-393-30220-2.
