= Josselin (disambiguation) =

Josselin is a commune in north-western France. It may also refer to

Given name

- Josselin de Rohan (born 1938), French politician
- Josselin Henry (born 1982), French sport shooter
- Josselin Ouanna (born 1986), French tennis player

Surname

- J.P.B. de Josselin de Jong (1886–1964), Dutch anthropologist
- Jean Josselin (born 1940), French boxer
- Jean-Marie Josselin, Hawaiian chef
- P.E. de Josselin de Jong (1922–1999), Dutch anthropologist
- Pieter de Josselin de Jong (1861–1906), Dutch painter
- Ralph Josselin (1617–1683), English vicar
- Tessa de Josselin (born 1989), Australian actress

Other

- Joslyn Castle in Omaha, Nebraska, United States

== See also ==
- Jocelyn
