= George Mavrothalassitis =

American chef

George Mavrothalassitis is a chef and restaurateur known as one of the cofounders of Hawaii Regional Cuisine in the early 1990s. Mavrothalassitis is particularly known for individual pairings of wines with each dish in a multicourse meal.

== Life ==
Mavrothalassitis was born in Provence, France, Greek father and an Italian mother. He moved to the United States in 1985. In 1988 he came to Hawaii when he was recruited to be the executive chef of La Mer at the Halekulani Hotel in Honolulu, Hawaii. From 1995 to 1998 he was executive chef of the Four Seasons Hotel in Maui, and the chef de cuisine of Seasons Restaurant. In 1998 he opened his own restaurant, named for his nickname, Chef Mavro in Honolulu, at 1969 South King Street. In April 2007, Mavrothalassitis opened Cassis, a casual dining restaurant with French and Hawaiian influences, also in Honolulu, which closed after ten months.

== Awards and accolades ==
In 2000, he appeared in the November cover story of Wine Spectator magazine as one of six selected chefs. In October 2002, Gourmet Magazine named his restaurant one of "America's Best Restaurants," the only mention from Hawaii. In 2003 the James Beard Foundation awarded Mavrothalassitis Best Chef: Northwest/Hawaii. Chef Mavro was the only Hawaii restaurant to make a place on Esquire Magazine's America's Best New Restaurants list.

One of the dishes at Chef Mavro are the lilikoi malasadas, or Portuguese donuts, which are served floating in a pool of fuchsia-hued guava coulis with pineapple-coconut ice cream. Mavrothalassitis has tried to remove them from the menu several times but they have always returned by popular demand. He has made numerous television appearances such as on CNN, The Food Channel, the PBS series Great Chefs in America, France's Antenne 2, and the Food Network.

== Other ventures ==
Mavrothalassitis has his own line of organic Kona coffee, which can be purchased at Hawaiian supermarkets. He also hosts his own cooking classes.

== See also ==
- Sam Choy
- Alan Wong
- Roy Yamaguchi
- List of restaurants in Hawaii
