= Sam Choy =

American chef, restaurateur, and television personality

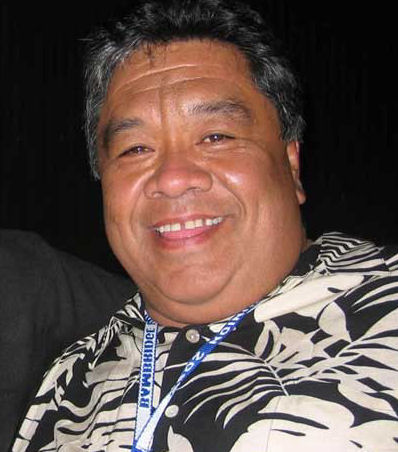
- Sam Choy during a meeting with Eni Faleomavaega
- Education: Kapiʻolani Community College
- Culinary career
- Cooking style: Pacific Rim cuisine
- Current restaurant
- Sam Choy's Kai Lanai
- Television show
- Iron Chef America
- Award
- James Beard Foundation Award for America's Classics (2004)

Sam Choy Sr. is an American chef, restaurateur, and television personality known as "the godfather of poke" and a founding contributor of Pacific Rim cuisine.

== Biography ==
Choy is the son of a Chinese father, Hung Sam Choy, and a German-Hawaiian mother, Clairemoana. He grew up in Laie, Oahu. Choy is an alumnus of the Kapiʻolani Community College's Culinary Arts program.

One of his first jobs as a chef was at The Waldorf-Astoria Hotel in New York City. He would then return to Hawaii, where he eventually opened a chain of restaurants. Choy helped develop and popularize Hawaii regional cuisine. In 1991, Choy founded the Poke Festival and Recipe Contest.

In 2004, Choy's restaurant Sam Choy's Kaloko in Kailua-Kona, on the Big Island of Hawaii, was named by the James Beard Foundation as one of America's Classics restaurants. The award recognizes "beloved regional restaurants" that reflect the character of their communities.

Choy has appeared in several Food Network programs, including Ready.. Set... Cook!, Chopped's first Grill Master Tournament, and Iron Chef America.

He is good friends with Emeril Lagasse, who has appeared on Choy's TV show Sam Choy's Kitchen on KHNL. Lagasse has also mentioned Choy by name several times in his television shows; one of those times he was making Poke on his live TV show, and added peanut butter to the Poke- Choy's "secret ingredient". In 2015, Choy broadcast a series on YouTube, Sam Choy In The Kitchen.

Choy has designed Hawaiian-inspired dishes for American Airlines's first class passengers to and from Hawaii.

== Personal life ==
He is married to Carol, with whom he has two sons, Sam Jr. and Christopher.

Choy lives in Kona District, Hawaii.

== Publications ==
- Sam Choy (1995). "With Sam Choy: Cooking from the Heart"
- Sam Choy (1999). "The Choy of Seafood"
- Sam Choy, U'I Goldsberry, & Steven Goldsberry (1999). "Sam Choy's Island Flavors"
- Sam Choy and Catherine Enomoto (2000). "Sam Choy's Cooking: Island Cuisine at Its Best"
- Sam Choy (2001). "Sam Choy Woks the Wok: Stir Fry Cooking at Its Island Best"
- Sam Choy (2001). "Sam Choy's Cooking with Kids"
- Sam Choy (2000). "Sam Choy's Sampler: Hawaii's Favorite Recipes"
- Sam Choy (2002). "Sam Choy's Polynesian Kitchen: More Than 150 Authentic Dishes from One of the World's Most Delicious and Overlooked Cuisine"
- Sam Choy (2002). "Sam Choy's visits Mr. Burkott and his farm in Hawaii"
- Sam Choy (2003). "Sam Choy's Little Hawaiian Cookbook for Big Appetites"
- Sam Choy, Lynn Cook, and Douglas Peebles (2003). "A Hawaiian Luau with Sam Choy and The Makaha Sons"
- Sam Choy and Elizabeth Meahl. (2004). "Sam Choy's A Little Hawaiian Poke Cookbook"
- Sam Choy (2006). "Aloha Cuisine"
- Sam Choy (2009). "Poke"

== Restaurants ==
- Holoholo Grill (Kauai at Koloa Landing Hotel)
- Huki Lau Cafe (no longer owned by Choy, Laie, O'ahu, Hawaii)
- Pier Nine by Sam Choy (HPU Campus, O'ahu, Hawaii)
- Sam Choy's Breakfast, Lunch, and Crab (Closed in 2013)
- Sam Choy's (Tumon Bay, Guam - Closed)
- Sam Choy's Kai Lanai ( Big Island, Hawaii - Closed)
- Sam Choy's Seafood Style Island Grille (Pearl Harbor, O'ahu, Hawaii)
- Sam Choy's Kahului (Queen Kaahumanu Center, Kahului, Maui - Closed)
- Sam Choy's Lahaina (Front Street - Closed)
- Sam Choy's Poke to the Max (Seattle & Tacoma, Washington)
- Sam Choy's Ohana Diner (Bowl Incline, Incline Village, Nevada)
- Sam Choy's Kaloko (Kaloko, Hawaii - Closed)

== See also ==
- Cuisine of Hawaii
- Iron Chef America
- George Mavrothalassitis
- Poke (Hawaii)
- Alan Wong
- Roy Yamaguchi
