= Mark Ellman =

Restaurant chef

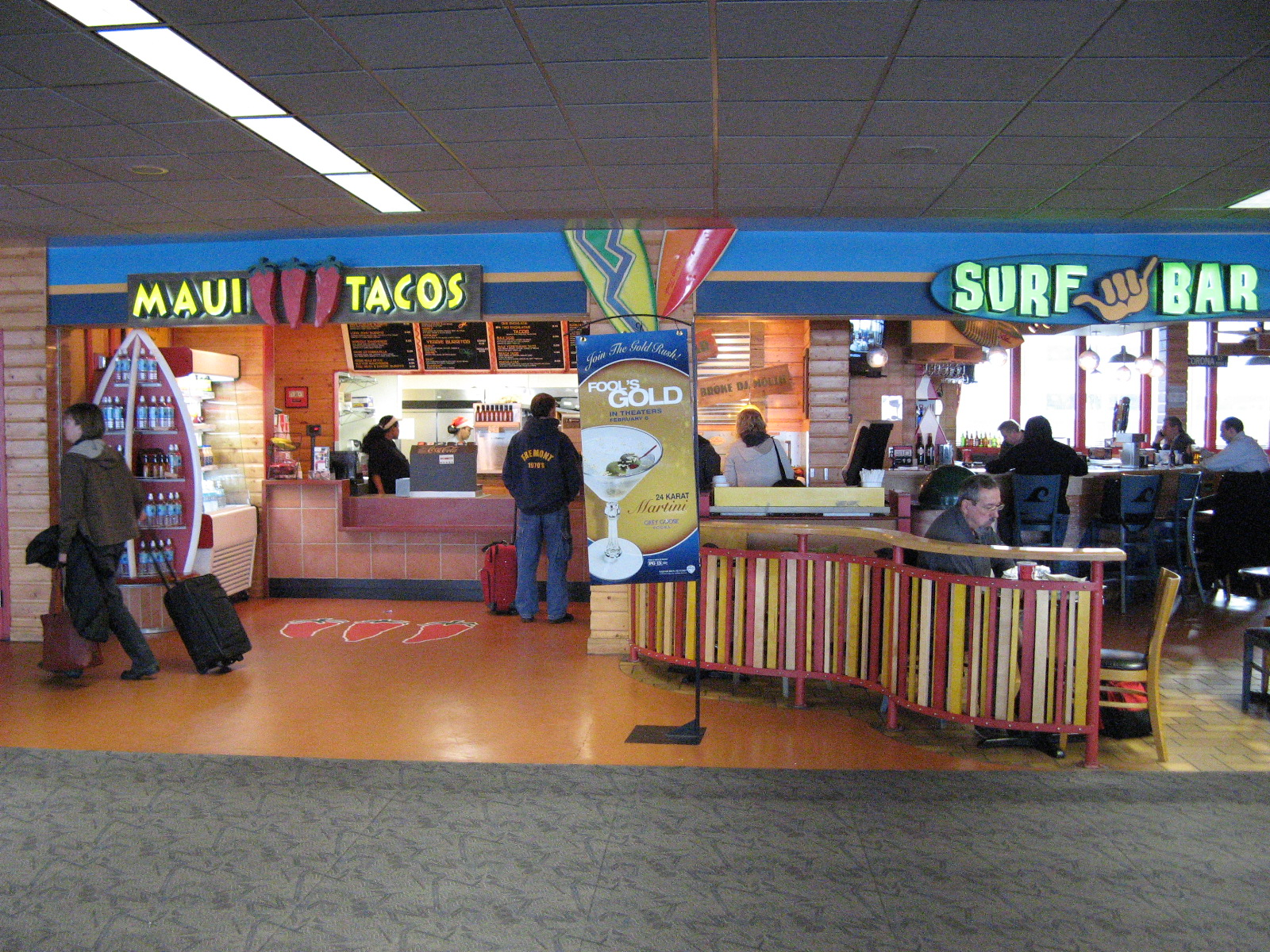
Maui Tacos restaurant

Mark Ellman (died February 26, 2023) was a Hawaii-based restaurant chef. His first Hawaiian restaurant, Avalon, is on Maui; he became its owner in 1991. By 2011 he had sold that restaurant, and had founded or purchased into several other similar establishments.

Ellman was one of the twelve chefs who developed and promoted Hawaii regional cuisine.

In 1988 his restaurant Avalon was the first of the chef-owned Hawaii regional restaurants and he was one of the founders of Honolulu Regional Cuisine in 1991. He urged the group to publish a cookbook The New Cuisine of Hawaii and his dishes, described by Honolulu magazine as "towering tiki-style" were featured in the book's pictures with dishes such as chili-seared salmon on the cover. He served tableside guacamole and wok-fried whole snapper in black bean sauce. In 2011 he was the chef and owner of Mala Ocean Tavern, Mala Wailea, and Honu Seafood in Lahaina. Ellman has started and sold various restaurants including Avalon, Maui Tacos, and Penne Pasta.
