= Alan Wong =

Japanese-American celebrity chef

- Born: November 2, 1956 (age 69); Tokyo, Japan
- Education: Kapiʻolani Community College
- Culinary career
- Cooking style: Hawaii Regional
- Current restaurant: Alan Wong's
- Award(s) won: 13 Rising Star Chefs Best Chef: Pacific Northwest/Hawaii America's Best Fifty Restaurants American Academy of Chefs Hall of Fame
- Website: www.alanwongs.com

Alan Wong (born November 2, 1956), is an American chef and restaurateur known for his contributions to Hawaiian cuisine.

== Career ==
Born to a Japanese mother and a half-Hawaiian, half-Chinese father, Wong is known as one of 12 figures (along with Sam Choy, Roy Yamaguchi, Peter Merriman, Bev Gannon and more) credited for popularizing Hawaiian cuisine.

The group came together to form an organization to create a new American regional cuisine, highlighting Hawaii's locally grown ingredients and diverse ethnic styles. In 1994 they all came together and compiled a cookbook, The New Cuisine of Hawaii, to be sold for charity. Wong and Choy are alumni of the Kapiʻolani Community College Culinary Arts program. Wong had several restaurants in Hawaii, as well as one in Japan.

Wong honed his skill working under André Soltner at Lutèce in New York, whom he considers as a mentor. Returning to Hawai'i, Wong opened Canoe House at the Mauna Lani hotel on the Big Island in 1989, where he began to develop his unique casual yet elegant Hawaiian style.

He then opened his signature restaurant on King Street in Honolulu in 1995, where he earned a James Beard Award in 1996.

A favorite of President Obama, Wong cooked a luau at the White House at the annual White House Congressional picnic for members of Congress and their families in 2009, and the Obamas frequently visited the restaurant during their holiday trips to Honolulu.

In 2004, Wong appeared as a guest judge on the television cooking competition Top Chef (the episode, part one of the season two finale, aired on January 24, 2007). The Top Chef contestants, after enjoying a luncheon hosted by Wong welcoming them to Hawaii, were challenged to cater his birthday luau.

Wong was also been featured on Season 4, Episode 9 of Anthony Bourdain: No Reservations in 2008, and on two episodes of Ed Kenney's Family Ingredients 2016.

== Recognition ==
In 2013, Wong was inducted into the American Academy of Chefs Culinary Hall of Fame. In 2007, Wong was awarded Chef of the Year by Santé Magazine. Gourmet ranked his eponymous Alan Wong's number six in a listing of America's Best Fifty Restaurants in 2001. In 1996, he was awarded the James Beard Award for Best Chef: Pacific Northwest, and was recognized by Robert Mondavi Winery as one of 13 Rising Star Chefs in America in 1994.

Wong also serves on the boards of Leeward Community College, the Culinary Institute of the Pacific's food service program, and the Hawaii Agriculture Foundation, as well as with Easter Seals Hawaii. He has been honored by Kapiʻolani Community College as a distinguished alumnus as well as by University of Hawaiʻi for services to state as a whole in education.

== Restaurants ==
A casualty of the COVID-19 pandemic, Wong decided to close his eponymous restaurant in November 2020 on his 64th birthday, the first time in over 30 years Wong he wasn't working full time as a chef. He would contribute to charity events and regroup, with plans to reopen Alan Wong's at The Kahala Hotel & Resort in early 2026.

== Books ==
- Henderson, Janice (1994). The New Cuisine of Hawaii. Villard. ISBN 9780679425298.
- Wong, Alan (1999). Alan Wong's New Wave Luau: Recipes from Honolulu's Award-Winning Chef. Ten Speed Press. ISBN 9780898159639.
- Wong, Alan (2010). The Blue Tomato: The Inspirations Behind the Cuisine of Alan Wong. Watermark Publishing. ISBN 9781935690078.
