= Jean-Marie Josselin =

American chef

- Culinary career
- Cooking style: Hawaii regional cuisine and American
- Current restaurant(s): Josselin's Tapas Bar & Grill, Koloa, Hawaii, United States
- Website: Jo2

Jean-Marie Josselin is a chef who was one of the pioneers of Hawaii regional cuisine. He authored A Taste of Hawaii.

== Early life ==
Josselin was born in Chamonix, France. After an apprenticeship at a local bistro, he decided to move to Paris and train as a chef. He studied at the Lycee Hotelier de Paris and worked at the Montorgueuil until he was approached by an American businessman to work in a restaurant in the United States.

== Career ==
He began working in St. Louis, Missouri in 1982, then moved from restaurant to restaurant. Josselin moved to Hawaii and began making food that fused the cuisines of Hawaii's many ethnic groups in 1985. In 1990 Josselin opened a restaurant in Kapaa, Kauai. He opened several other restaurants, then suddenly sold all of his restaurants and went on hiatus. By 2015, he had opened three restaurants in Kauai and a restaurant in Las Vegas.
