= Roy Yamaguchi =

Japanese-American celebrity chef

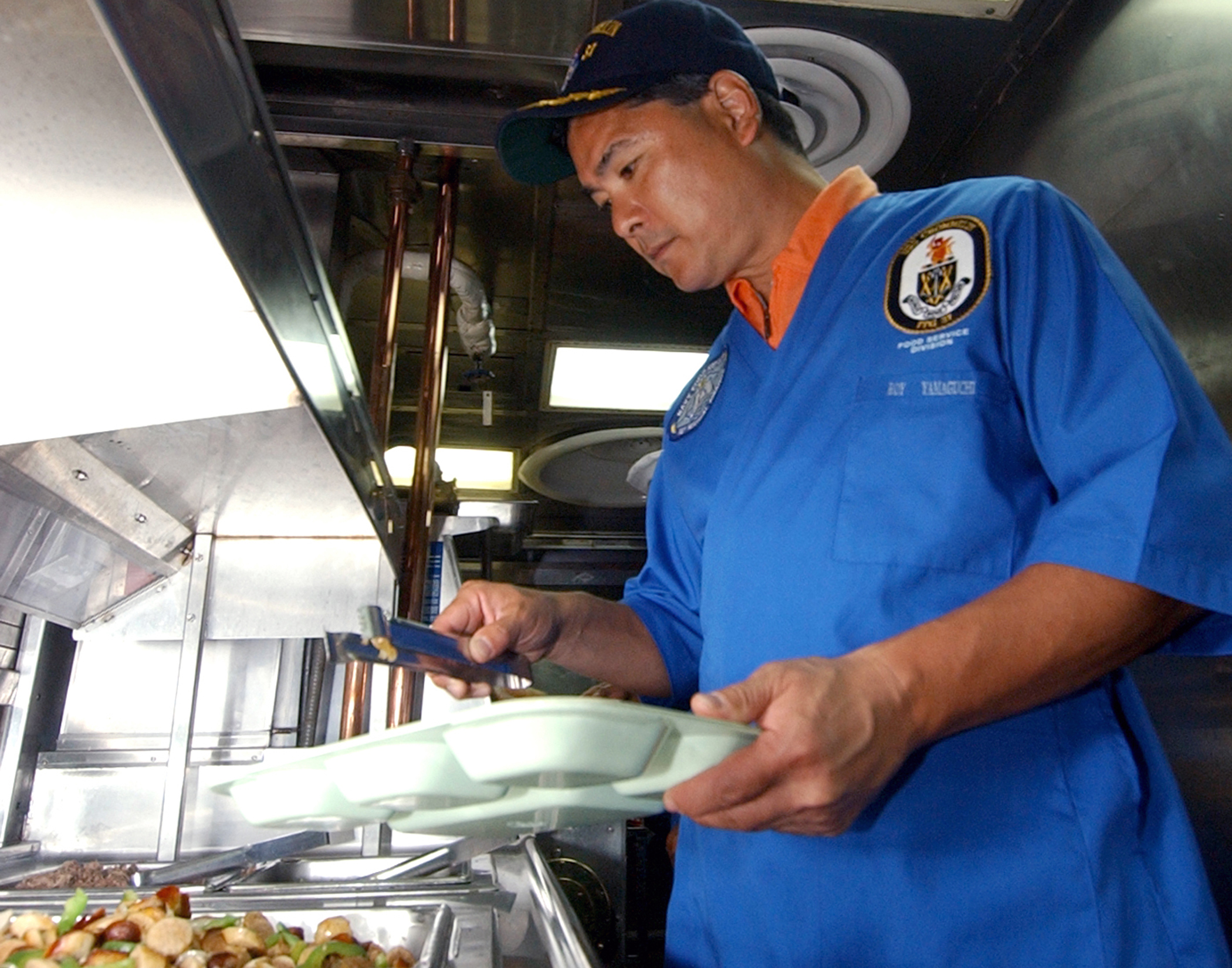
- Roy Yamaguchi during a visit to the Pearl Harbor-based guided missile frigate USS Crommelin in 2004
- Born: 1956 (age 69–70); Tokyo, Japan
- Education: Culinary Institute of America
- Culinary career
- Cooking style: Hawaii Regional
- Current restaurant(s): Roy's Hawaii, Roy's Restaurant, Eating House 1849
- Award won: James Beard "Best Pacific Northwest Chef"
- Website: www.royyamaguchi.com

Roy Yamaguchi (born 1956) is a Japanese-American celebrity chef, restaurateur, and founder of a collection of restaurants, including 30 Roy's Restaurants in the United States and Guam, the Tavern by Roy Yamaguchi and Eating House 1849. He is one of the founding members of the Hawaii Regional Cuisine movement.

== Biography ==
Roy Yamaguchi is the chef and founder of a collection of restaurants, including 30 Roy's Restaurants in the United States and Guam, the Tavern by Roy Yamaguchi, and Eating House 1849. He is known for Hawaiian-inspired cuisine, an eclectic blend of California-French-Japanese cooking traditions created with fresh ingredients from the Islands. He was honored with the James Beard "Best Pacific Northwest Chef" Award in 1993.

Yamaguchi was born and raised in Tokyo, Japan. His Hawaiian roots are tied to his paternal grandfather, who owned a tavern in Wailuku, Maui, in the 1940s. He attributes his appreciation for food to his Hawaii-born father and his Okinawa-born mother. Upon graduating from high school, Yamaguchi enrolled in the Culinary Institute of America (CIA) in New York, where he received his formal culinary training. After graduating in 1976, he accepted positions at California restaurants, including L'Escoffier, L'Ermitage, Le Serene, Michael's, and Le Gourmet in the Sheraton Plaza La Reina. In 1984, Yamaguchi opened his first restaurant, 385 North, in Hollywood. In 1988, he moved to Honolulu to open the first Roy's Restaurant. Since then, he has opened 29 restaurants in the United States and others in Japan, Guam, and Hong Kong. He also teamed with Outback Steakhouse to open a Eurasian-themed restaurant in Florida.

Yamaguchi is also known as a television personality, hosting six seasons of the PBS series Hawaii Cooks with Roy Yamaguchi. He was featured on the Food Network's My Country, My Kitchen, taking him back to his roots in Japan.

In 2004, he launched a "Roy Yamaguchi" brand of cookware that sold on the Home Shopping Network. Partnering with Da Farmer & The Chef in 2007, Yamaguchi has also developed a "Roy Yamaguchi" food product line. He has published four cookbooks: Pacific Bounty, Roy's Feasts from Hawaii, Hawaii Cooks: Flavors from Roy's Pacific Rim Kitchen, and Roy's Fish and Seafood.

In addition, Yamaguchi founded and chairs, along with Chef Alan Wong, the Hawaii Food & Wine Festival. He established the Tom and Warren Matsuda Scholarship Fund, providing scholarships to students to attend the Culinary Institute of the Pacific. Founding the Roy's Annual Golf Classic more than 17 years ago, Yamaguchi has been instrumental in raising more than $400,000 for Imua Family Service. Yamaguchi also serves as a trustee and/or member of nonprofit boards, including the U.S. Japan Council, Go For Broke, Culinary Institute of the Pacific, Hawaii Culinary Education Foundation, and Good to Grow.

== Restaurants ==
In 2000, Yamaguchi sold the interest in the mainland US locations of Roy's Seafood restaurants to Bloomin' Brands, parent of Outback Steakhouse. Yamaguchi retained control and ownership of all Hawaii-based locations and the location at Pebble Beach. In 2015, Bloomin' Brands sold the mainland US Roy's operations to United Ohana for $10,000,000 US (approx. $500,000 per location), citing a lack of strategic focus for development.

United Ohana owned locations, still branded Roy's, are accessible under the roysrestaurant.com domain name. Locations owned by Roy Yamaguchi are accessible under the royshawaii.com domain. Roy maintains six locations in Hawaii: Waikiki, Hawaii Kai, Kaanapali, Waikoloa, Ko Olina, and Turtle Bay.

== See also ==
- Sam Choy
- George Mavrothalassitis
- Alan Wong
