= Peter Merriman =

American chef

- Born: Pittsburgh, Pennsylvania, US
- Culinary career
- Cooking style: Hawaii Regional Cuisine
- Current restaurant(s): Merriman's (Waimea, Big Island of Hawaii); Merriman's Poipu Fish House and Downstairs Cafe (Poipu, Kauai); Merriman's Kapalua (Kapalua/Lahaina, Maui); Monkeypod Kitchen by Merriman (Wailea, Maui)
- Website: www.merrimanshawaii.com

Peter Merriman is an American chef, restaurateur and one of the 12 founding chefs of Hawaii regional cuisine. In 2011, he and the other Hawaii Regional Cuisine chefs were inducted to the Hawaii Restaurant Association Hall of Fame.

As a culinary expert in Hawaii for over 25 years, his restaurants showcase island grown and harvested foods through simple preparations that reflect the flavors of Hawaii's multiculturalism. He was called the “Pied Piper of Hawaii Regional Cuisine” by The Los Angeles Times.

== Biography ==
Merriman was born in Pittsburgh. His mother Woodene (Woody) Merriman, a Pittsburgh Post Gazette food writer, exposed Peter to the field at a young age. She got him a job at the H. J. Heinz Co, doing prep work for Ferdinand Metz, who later became president of the Culinary Institute of America.

Merriman attended the University of Pennsylvania and studied political science. After graduation, he enrolled in a three-year Chefs Apprentice Program with RockResorts, under the direction of the American Culinary Federation, cooking in resorts across the United States and Europe, including a summer in the vineyards of France's Champagne region.

In early 1983, Peter was hired as a cook for the Mauna Lani Bay Hotel on the big island of Hawaii. In 1985, two years after his arrival, he was appointed executive chef of the Mauna Lani Resort's new Gallery Restaurant. At his interview for chef of The Gallery Restaurant, Merriman was asked what type of food he wanted to feature. Thinking it was a rhetorical question, he answered “regional cuisine” and went on to explain how no other restaurants were serving the local fish and produce. When he got the job, he had to deliver on the concept but quickly discovered there were almost no local products available. Merriman launched a guerrilla marketing campaign, by advertising in local newspapers and visiting local farms, ranches and docks to let purveyors know he wanted whatever they could offer. “We’re in this together,” he told them, “If you grow it or catch it, I’ll buy it, and we all succeed.” Pretty soon he had built solid partnerships and local producers would try to get or grow whatever he needed.

As he began recruiting other chefs to focus on local foods “Hawaii Regional Cuisine” was created, with Merriman named as the founding president.

== Restaurants ==
In 1988, Merriman opened his signature upcountry restaurant, Merriman's, in Waimea, Hawaii. He was proclaimed, "A gourmet in cowboy country" by Hana Hou. The New York Times raved “Everything at Merriman’s as one that features the freshest local ingredients paired in exciting ways,” and San Francisco Magazine exclaimed “His Wok-charred Ahi is to die for!”.

In 1994, Merriman partnered with TS Restaurants to open Hula Grill on Maui's Ka`anapali Beach. Hula Grill, touted “the best fish house in the islands” by Honolulu Magazine, brought the concepts of Hawaii regional cuisine to a beachside setting.

In 2008, Peter opened Merriman's Kapalua in Kapalua, Maui. Merriman's Kapalua was voted one of Trip Advisor's Top 10 Fine Dining Restaurants in the country in 2017.

In 2009, Peter opened Merriman's Fish House in Poipu, Kauai. Downstairs from the Fish House, Peter offers casual dining at Merriman's Gourmet Pizza & Burgers.

In winter 2011, Merriman launched a new venture in casual dining with restaurateur Bill Terry, Handcrafted Restaurants. Handcrafted Restaurants operates Monkeypod Kitchen in three locations across the islands. The restaurant features locally sourced menus with a focus on sustainable meat, fish and produce.

Handcrafted Restaurants also operates Moku Kitchen in the Kaka'ako district in Honolulu, Oahu.

In 2015, Merriman debuted his first cookbook, Merriman's Hawaii.

== Philanthropy ==
Merriman also supports Merriman's Culinary Scholarships for students entering or continuing in the field of Culinary Arts at either Hawaii Community College or the University of Hawaii Center at West Hawaii.

Merriman also serves on the Board of Directors as Vice President for Hawaii Island Land Trust, a non profit organization dedicated to protecting land in Hawaii.
