= Kapiʻolani Community College =

Public college in Honolulu, Hawaii, US

Coordinates: 21°16.29′N 157°48.03′W

University of Hawaiʻi Kapiʻolani Community College
- Motto: Kūlia I Ka Nuʻu (Strive for the Highest)
- Type: Public community college
- Established: 1946; 80 years ago
- Parent institution: University of Hawaiʻi System
- Accreditation: ACCJC
- Academic affiliations: Space-grant
- Chancellor: Misaki Takabayashi
- Students: 6,899
- Location: Honolulu, Hawaii, United States
- Campus: Urban
- Colors: Blue and White
- Website: kapiolani.hawaii.edu
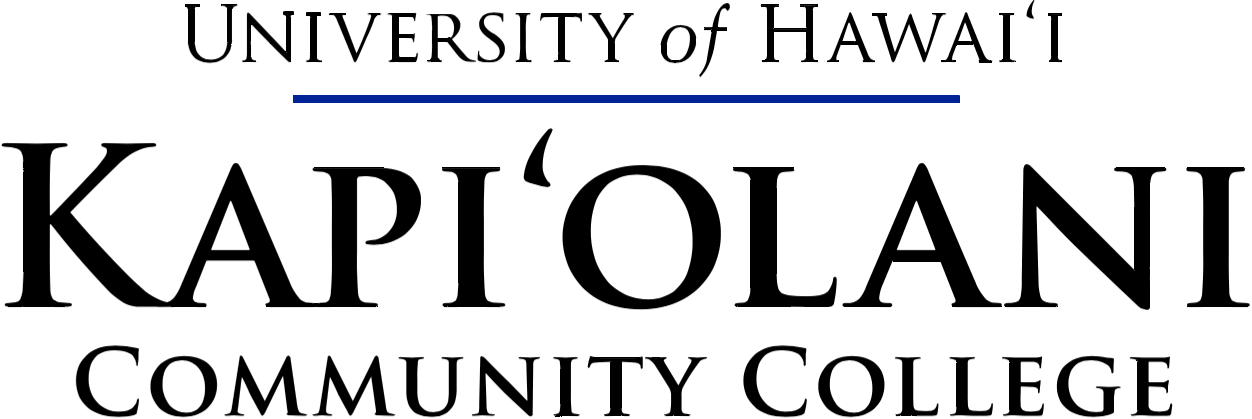

The University of Hawaiʻi Kapiʻolani Community College is a public community college in Honolulu, Hawaiʻi. It is part of the University of Hawaiʻi System and accredited by the Accrediting Commission for Community and Junior Colleges.

== History ==
Originally located at Pensacola Street and Kapiʻolani Boulevard (from which the school gets its name), adjacent to President William McKinley High School in the Makiki community, University of Hawaiʻi Kapiʻolani Community College was established in 1946 as Kapiʻolani Technical College.

The school was administered by the Territory of Hawaii as a vocational school specializing in food service. In 1965, it became a public college administered by the University of Hawaiʻi. As part of the realignment, the school adopted its current name.

=== Expansion ===
Experiencing rapid growth in the 1970s, the Community College needed larger facilities. In 1974, the Board of Regents acquired a 52-acre (210,000 m^{2}) parcel of land on the slopes of Diamond Head in Waikīkī. University of Hawaiʻi Kapiʻolani Community College opened its second campus at Fort Ruger.

All programs were transferred to the Fort Ruger campus, and the Makiki campus closed, in the 1980s.

== Notable alumni ==
- Jacob Batalon, actor
