= Maui Tacos =

Restaurant

- Founded: 1993; 32 years ago
- Headquarters: Larchmont, New York
- Website: mauitacos.com

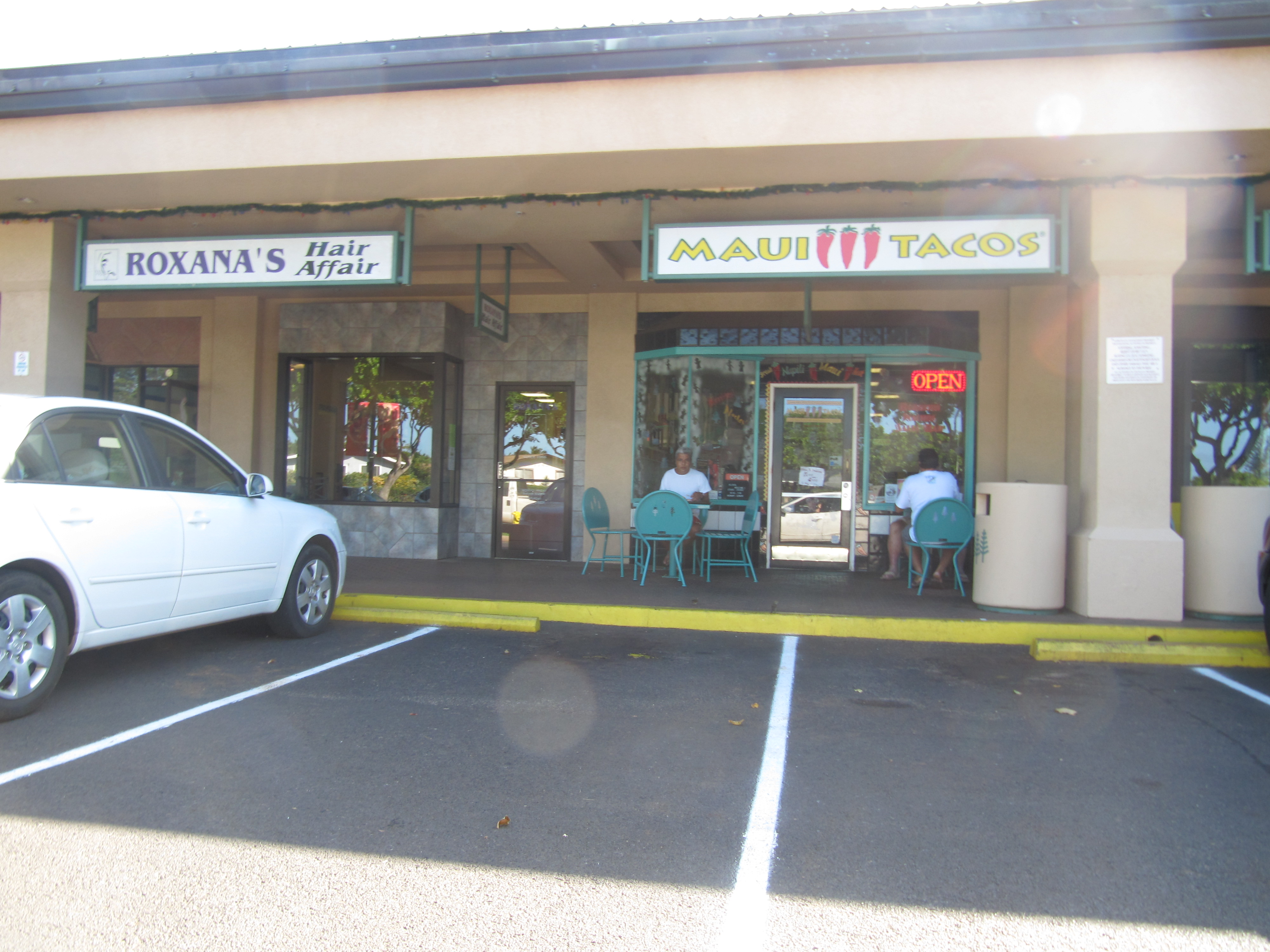
Maui Tacos No. 2

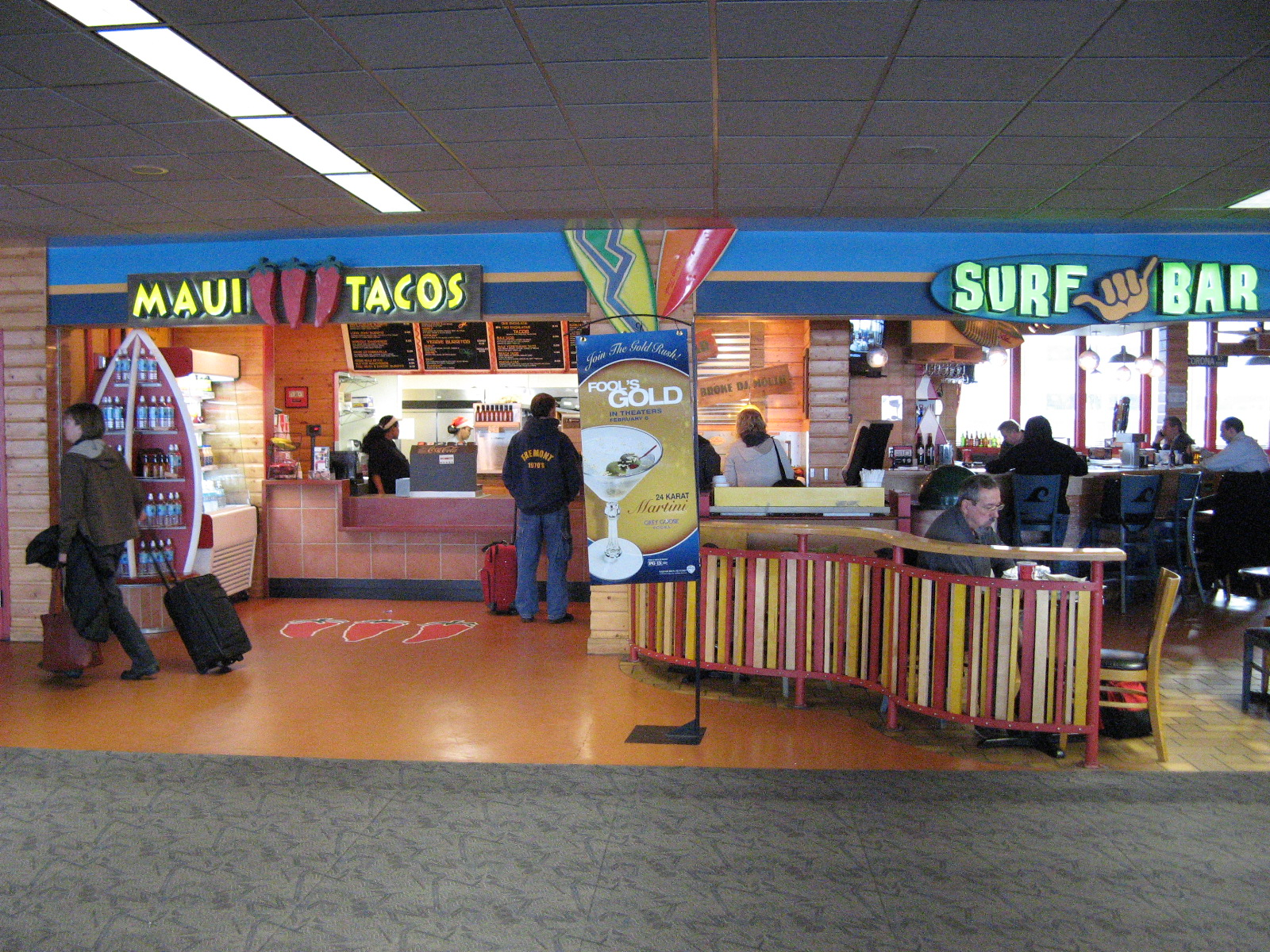
Maui Tacos interior

Maui Tacos is a fast casual franchise restaurant that serves Maui-Mex food with a fusion of Hawaiian flavors. The first Maui Tacos was opened by Mark Ellman, Jose Vega, and Sergio Perez in 1993 in Nāpili, Maui, Hawaiʻi. Ellman opened six more locations in Hawaiʻi before opening his first store in the mainland in 1998. Maui Tacos now has 21 restaurants in 11 states (including the District of Columbia) and recently opened its sixth Maui location, in Kalama Village, Kihei. In June 2009, the company's eight Hawaii locations were sold to Maui Tacos International, the New York-based company that operated the mainland locations under a franchise agreement.

The menu includes tacos, burritos, quesadillas, nachos, enchiladas, and salads.

== See also ==
- Taco
- Mexican cuisine
- List of restaurants in Hawaii
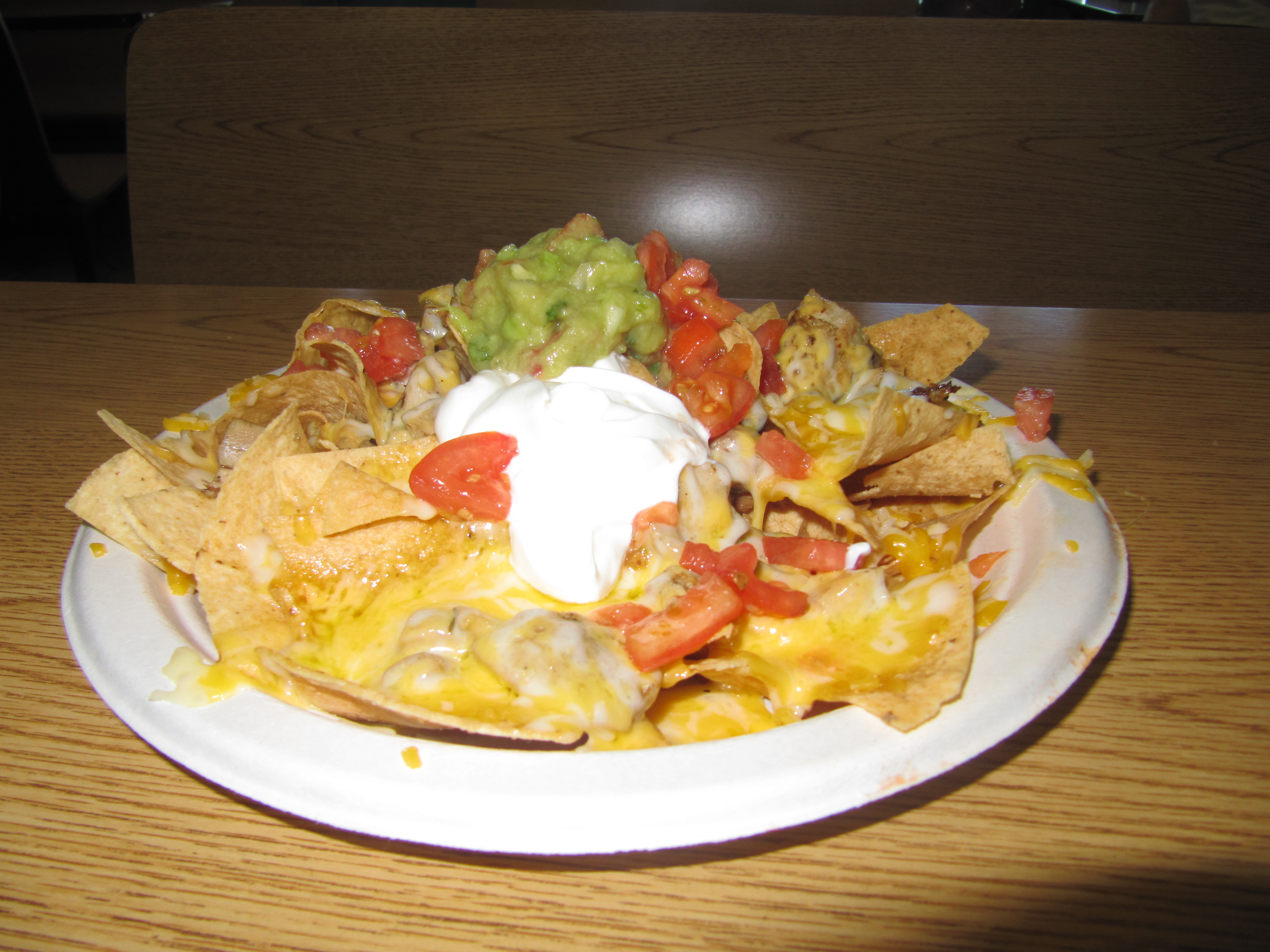
- Nachos as served at Maui Tacos
