= Lomi-lomi salmon =

Hawaiian tomato and salmon salad

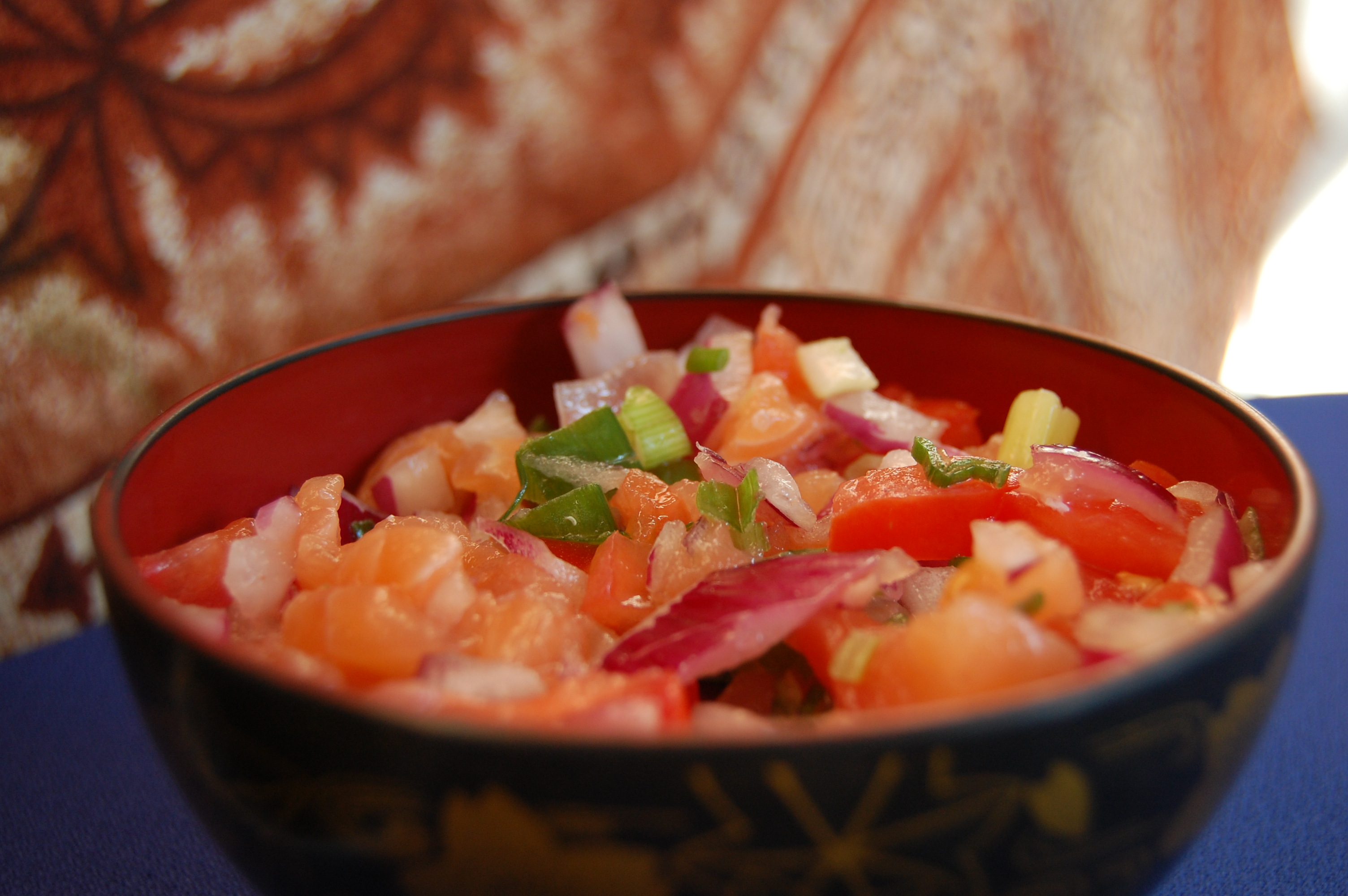
- Alternative names: Lomi salmon; kāmano lomi
- Type: Poke
- Course: Side dish
- Place of origin: Hawaii
- Main ingredients: salmon, onions, tomato
- Variations: lomi ʻōpae, lomi ʻōpelu
- Similar dishes: Poke, pico de gallo, poisson cru, ceviche, lomi oio

Lomi-lomi salmon (or lomi salmon) is a side dish in Hawaiian cuisine containing salted salmon, onions, and tomatoes. Its origin is similar to poisson cru. It resembles pico de gallo not only in appearance, but also in the way it is often consumed: as an accompaniment (or condiment) to other foods, in this case poi or kalua pork.

Hawaiians of yesteryear would probably not recognize the contemporary version of this dish served today. However, it is seen today as a quintessential side dish when serving traditional Hawaiian foods or at traditional lū‘au festivities. While salmon is not a fish found in Hawaiian waters, and onions and tomatoes are not "pre-contact" foods, lomilomi salmon is still embraced as an ethnic Hawaiian dish. It is appropriate that dish should be known popularly by its hapa name "lomi salmon" rather than "lomi kāmano".

A similar dish called lomi ʻōpae (ʻōpae lit. "shrimp") uses dried shrimp in place of salted salmon and was made popular by singer Henry Kapono.

== Preparation ==
Hawaiians were first introduced to salmon around the early 1800s, as contract laborers sent to the Pacific Northwest. Salmon would have likely been traditionally prepared as poke. A typical relish was made of ʻinamona mixed with dried ʻalaʻala (octopus liver) and ʻalaea salt. The poke was accompanied with several types of ʻakaʻakai (onion), limu kohu and a large bowl of poi.

A type of poke in essence, the name lomilomi is taken from the traditional method of preparation (Hawaiian for "to massage") where fresh fish is rubbed with salt in varying amounts to simply season it for flavor or to cure it for preservation. In the evolution of this dish from its poke origins, the salt salmon is then cubed into small ~1 cm pieces and again massaged into chopped tomatoes and onions of about the same size. Some modern recipes call for scallions, cucumbers, chilis, additional salt, or lime, or even fish substitutes other than salmon and is typically served chilled or with ice.

== Background ==
When Captain James Cook arrived in 1778, he brought along with him the concept of preserved fish and meat—such as salted cod and corned beef—common rations of foreign navies, whalers, and traders.

In the 1790s, Spanish horticulturist Francisco de Paula Marin brought tomatoes to the Hawaiian Islands. He was the first to successfully cultivate and raise tomatoes. De Paula Marin further popularized the planting of onions.

In 1829, the Hudson's Bay Company, a fur trading company looking to expand its business in new resources discovered during the expeditions of the Northwest Passage, established an office in Honolulu to market the Pacific Northwest's abundant timber to a growing non-native settlement. The company would hire many Hawaiians as sailors and laborers in the fur and lumber trades. The physical strength of the native Hawaiians had made an impression on the British. Dozens were initially sent to their British Columbia facilities which also operated commercial fisheries at its Fort Langley trading post. Many were likely to have consumed fresh and cured salmon, which became a very important commodity.

By 1840, around 300 to 400 native Hawaiian laborers were sent to the Northwest in vessels and at ports. Many of these laborers chose to permanently settle in the Northwest after their contracts expired. For those returning to Hawaii, the voyage took about three weeks. Since fresh salmon would not last the journey, these laborers introduced salted salmon, which immediately became popular.

The practice of salting fish for preservation was already known to the ancient Hawaiians, and was often consumed with poi during periods when the regular fish supply was scarce or when fishing was not possible like during storms. Fish was preferably eaten raw with some alaea salt or sometimes seasoned with blood from the gills. The families of missionaries found salted salmon to be a substitute for salt cod—the New England standby. Similarly, the Portuguese starting in the late 1800s brought with them bacalhau, a Portuguese salted cod.

The Northwest was exporting 3,000 to 4,000 barrels of salted salmon, mainly to Hawaii and Asia by 1835. Following the formation of a constitutional monarchy in Hawaii, the first tariff act took effect on January 1, 1843. The first vessel to make customs entry and to pay the ad valorem tax at three percent was the Hudson's Bay barque Vancouver from the Columbia River, January 6, 1843. The vessel's cargo consisted of 695 barrels of Columbia River salmon valued at $4,170 ($172,261 in 2023), and 160 twelve-foot four-inch planks valued at $307.20 ($12,690.31 in 2023). On this amount $134.32 ($5,548.70 in 2023) in duty was collected.

== See also ==
- List of fish dishes
- Lomi oio
- Poke
- Bacalhau
- Francisco de Paula Marín
- Hudson's Bay Company
- Poisson cru
- Salmon
- Salt cod
