= Lomi ʻōʻio =

Hawaiian fishpaste

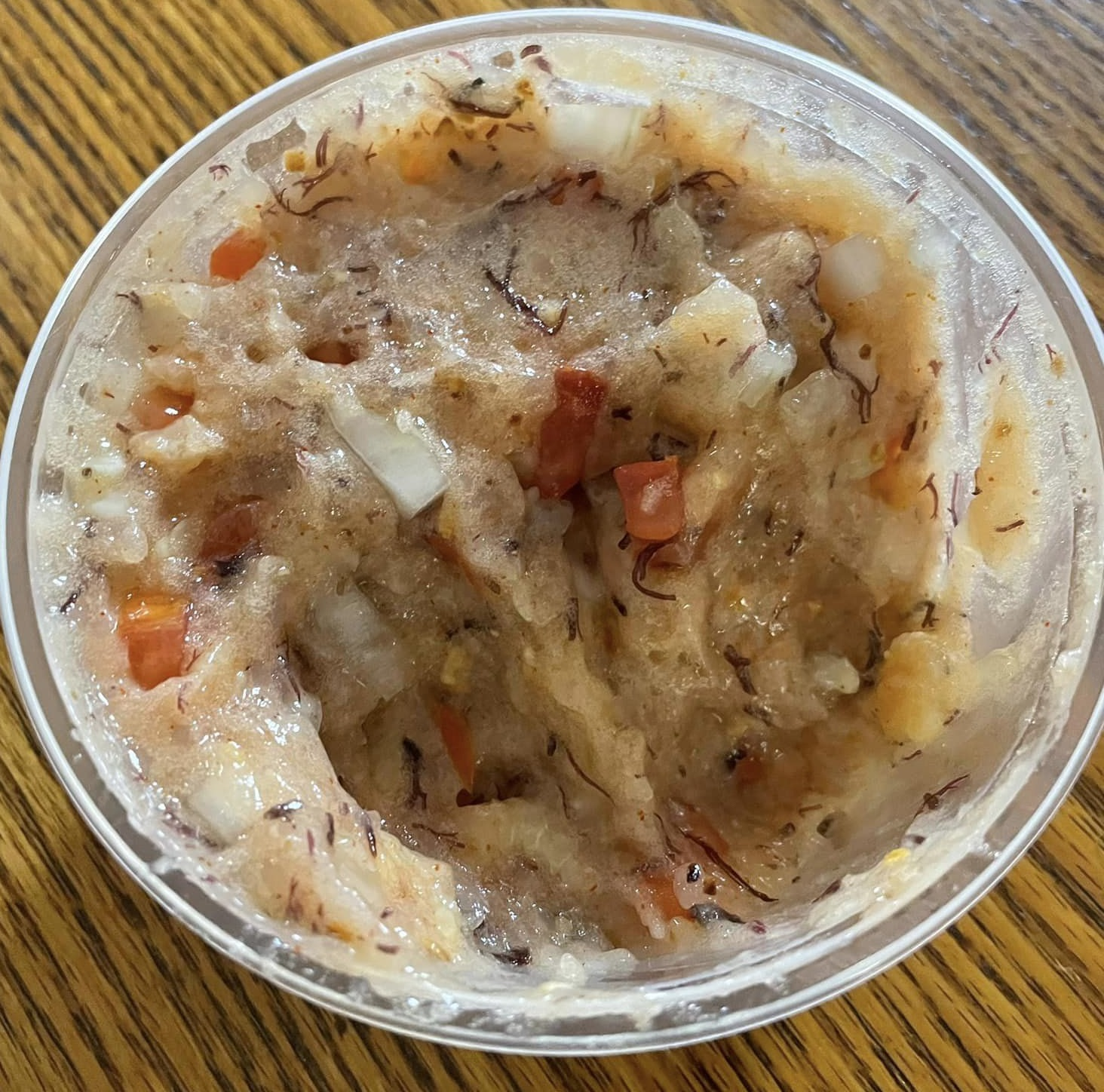
- Lomi ʻōʻio with ogo, dried shrimp, onions, tomato
- Course: Side dish
- Place of origin: Hawaii
- Serving temperature: Cold
- Main ingredients: Bonefish (Albula), salt
- Variations: Lomi salmon, Lomi iʻa (all fish in general)
- Similar dishes: Poke, Namerō

Lomi ʻōʻio is a raw fish dish in traditional Hawaiian cuisine using ʻōʻio (bonefish). This dish is an heirloom recipe fairly unchanged since pre-contact Hawaii, and is a precursor or progenitor to the more well-known but en vogue poke seen today.

It is a common preparation of the local recreational fly fishermen who catch this fish and is considered a special side dish at traditional lūʻau gathering for many Hawaiian families.

== Background ==
Native species of ʻōʻio (A. glossodonta, A. virgata) live in inshore waters and move into shallow mudflats or sand flats with the tides. This made it one of the more common fish species able to be cultivated in ancient Hawaiian fishponds. Deep sea fish like aku, a popular fish for poke today, were reserved for the upper class according to the kapu system. However,ʻōʻio was able to be consumed by the makaʻāinana (commoner).

Like many fish dishes in ancient Hawaiian cuisine, fish was minimally prepared with a few ingredients and preferably eaten raw.

== Preparation ==
First, the ʻōʻio is descaled, gutted, and filleted. The delicate flesh is then collected by scraping it off the skin and bones using a shell or spoon.

The collected flesh is massaged by hand, or lomi (Hawaiian lit. "to massage"), to check for bones and scales then further massaged into a homogenous paste. Water is added to adjust the texture and consistency, and seasoned with salt.

Common native ingredient additions are inamona, fresh or dried limu or ogo, opihi, and fresh or dried shrimp. Tomatoes, onions or scallions, and chili can also be added. When ʻōʻio is not available, finely minced ʻahi, aku, or ʻopelu, or other suitable fish can be substituted.

The texture of lomi ʻōʻio is similar to raw surimi. Raw ʻōʻio paste not prepared for lomi ʻ ōʻio is commonly prepared for fishcake or fishballs. It is also very similar to namerō, a Japanese fish tartare.

== See also ==
- List of fish dishes
- Poke
- Lomi salmon
- Surimi
