= Poke (dish) =

Hawaiian raw fish dish

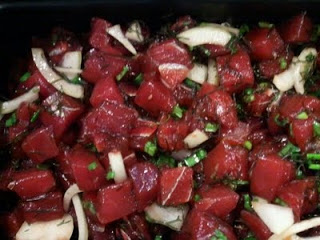
- Poke made with tuna, soy sauce, salt, green onions, Maui onions, rice, and limu
- Place of origin: Ancient Hawaii
- Region or state: Hawaii
- Serving temperature: Cold
- Main ingredients: Tuna, sea salt, ʻinamona, limu, onions
- Variations: Lomi oio, lomi salmon
- Similar dishes: ʻOta ʻika, kinilaw, kelaguen, hinava, ceviche

Poke or poké (Note: The spelling poké, with the acute accent, is to aid pronunciation as two syllables from similar English poke homographs.) (/ˈpoʊkeɪ/ POH-kay, Hawaiian: [ˈpoke]) is a dish of diced raw fish (poke being Hawaiian for 'to slice' or 'cut crosswise into pieces') tossed in sauce and served either as an appetizer or a main course.

== History ==
=== Pre-contact period ===
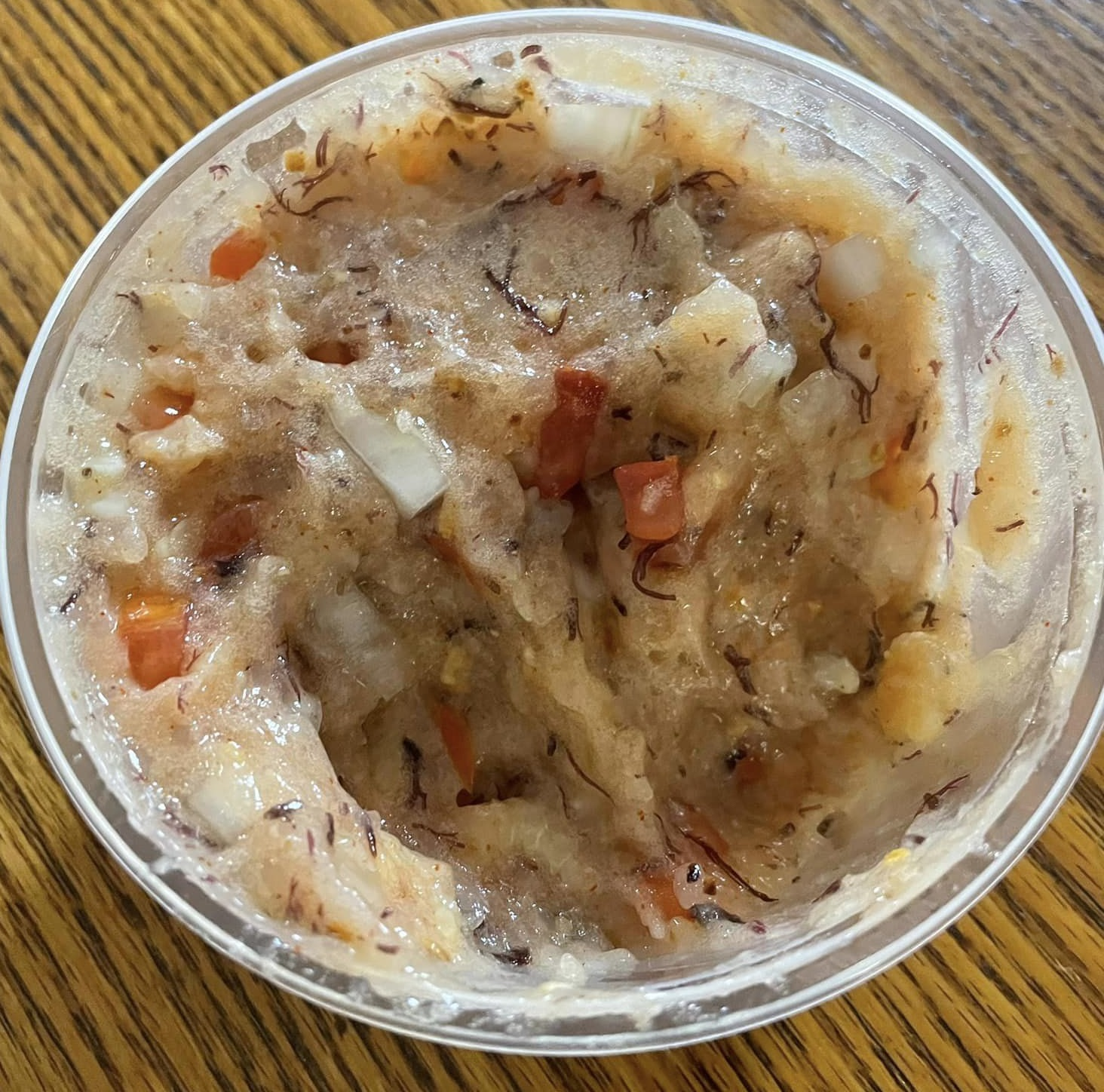
Lomi ʻōʻio

Most fish were cultivated in large fishponds or caught near shore in shallow waters and reefs. Fishing and fish caught beyond the reef in the deep sea were reserved for chiefs according to the kapu system which regulated the way of life in Ancient Hawaii.

Poke began as cut-offs from catch to serve as a snack. Fish was preferably cut up for immediate consumption, raw with sea salt, ʻinamona, and sometimes seasoned with blood from the gills. A typical relish was made of ʻinamona mixed with dried ʻalaʻala (octopus inksac), ake (fish liver), and salt. The poke was accompanied with limu and a large bowl of poi.

=== Post-contact period ===
When Captain James Cook arrived in 1778 he brought along with him onion seeds. He was followed in the 1790s by Spanish horticulturist Francisco de Paula Marin, who was the first to cultivate and raise tomatoes. De Paula Marin would further popularize the planting of onions which became a popular accompaniment. The onion cultivar known as sweet Maui onion would be developed over the years.

Continued Western influence eventually led to the abolition of the kapu system. The prohibition on eating certain types of fish was lifted in 1819 and by 1839 Kamehameha III had opened up fishing grounds beyond the reefs. By this time, Hawaiians were first introduced to salmon when working as contract laborers in the fur trading and timber industries in the Pacific Northwest. Salmon would have likely been prepared as poke initially which would later evolve into lomi salmon.

Beginning in the mid-19th century, immigrants from China and Japan moved to the islands as plantation laborers, bringing with them foods such as namerō, soy sauce and sesame oil.

=== Tuna industry ===
Tuna fishing has been important in Pacific Island countries for centuries, but prior to 1900 this activity was restricted to small-scale fishing, mainly using canoes just outside the reef. Between the 1920s and 1930s, almost all the fishing vessels in Hawaiian waters belonged to the Japanese, primarily longline fishing for albacore and skipjack tuna. Most of these tuna would be canned for export, but some would be reserved fresh for the local market. By the 1970s, the increasing affluence of the Japanese consumer created greater demand for sashimi grade tuna.

An increase in yellowfin tuna and bigeye tuna landing between the 1970s and 1980s resulted in competition for the fresh tuna market, reducing the available market for skipjack tuna. Yellowfin and bigeye tuna are preferred over skipjack tuna for sashimi in the export markets. Skipjack tuna is usually priced lower on average but is widely appreciated by locals. In 1985, the average price for yellowfin tuna was 26% higher than bigeye tuna, increasing to 58% by 1991. Flash-frozen skipjack and yellowfin tuna imported to Hawaii from Japan also competes with the Hawaii fishery for a share of the local market.

=== Hawaii regional cuisine ===
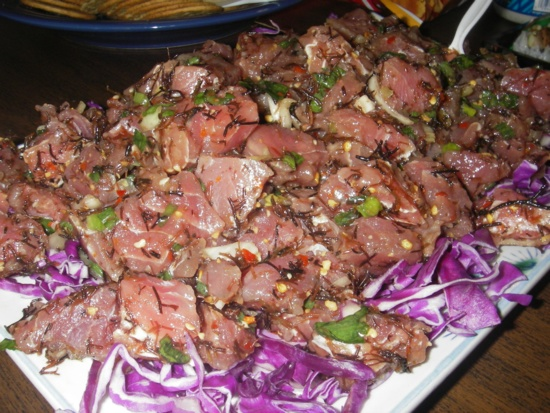
Ahi poke (tuna) made with green onions, chili peppers, sea salt, soy sauce, sesame oil, roasted kukui nut (candlenut), and limu, served on a bed of red cabbage

According to the food historian Rachel Laudan, the present form of poke became popular around the 1970s. However, poke made at home or found at seafood counters was limited to one of two flavors: onion or limu. Sashimi, which was already popular by this time, evolved into a Japanese-Hawaiian sashimi salad-like fusion, very similar to tataki.

In the early 1990s, a group of local chefs advocated for a distinct Hawaiian fusion style, cuisine which drew from local ingredients and a fusion of ethnic culinary influences. Master chef Sam Choy, was a founding chef of this movement, started a poke festival in 1992 which consisted of a poke recipe contest for professional chefs and amateur cooks. The initial contest offered more than $15,000 in cash and prizes. Chefs showcased many new combinations of flavors, and made the rather common dish into an upscale item at restaurants.

== Ingredients ==
=== Fish ===
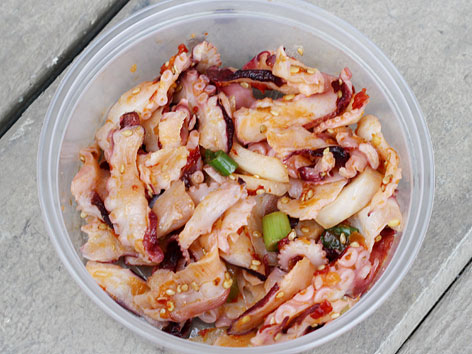
Tako (octopus) poke or heʻe poke with sesame seed oil, crushed chili, and sea salt

There are many commercial caught local fish that can be eaten raw according to the FDA. However, the most commonly caught fish in Hawaiian waters for poke found at local seafood counters include (alternate Japanese names are indicated in parentheses):

- ʻAhi: albacore tuna (tombo), bigeye tuna (mebachi), yellowfin tuna (kihada)
- Aku: skipjack tuna (katsuo)
- Aʻu: blue marlin (kajiki), striped marlin (nairagi), shortbill spearfish (hebi), broadbill swordfish (shutome), sailfish
- Heʻe: octopus (tako)
- ʻOpihi: yellowfoot, blackfoot

The influence of the Japanese fishing market still remains strong, that these fish are often recognized locally by both their Hawaiian and Japanese names. But it also recalls that deep sea fishing was not an ordinary practice to the ancient Hawaiians who were adept at naming many fish species.

Kona kampachi (kanpachi) is farmed off the coast of the Island of Hawaii. Imported fish such as yellowtail (hamachi) and farmed salmon, such as Atlantic (including Atlantic "Scottish"), King Salmon (from New Zealand) are hugely popular. Wild salmon largely remains unsafe because of the risk of parasites. Most imported fish from Japan are typically served as sashimi or for sushi but are suitable for poke as well, such as madai, maguro, and saba. Most fresh shellfish, including octopus, can be safely consumed raw with caution but are often cooked (or at least cured) especially when being sold commercially as poke.

While poke is associated as a raw fish dish, in contemporary times, it is rather freeform. It can be cured like ceviche or cooked, not made with fish, nor does it have to be cut into cubes. Chef Sam Choy had popularized "fried poke". Pipikaula (Hawaiian-style beef jerky), ake (raw beef liver) and tripe, and tartare of beef can be prepared into poke as well. Imitation crab (kanikama) is also common, along with tofu a common vegetarian option.

=== Additions ===
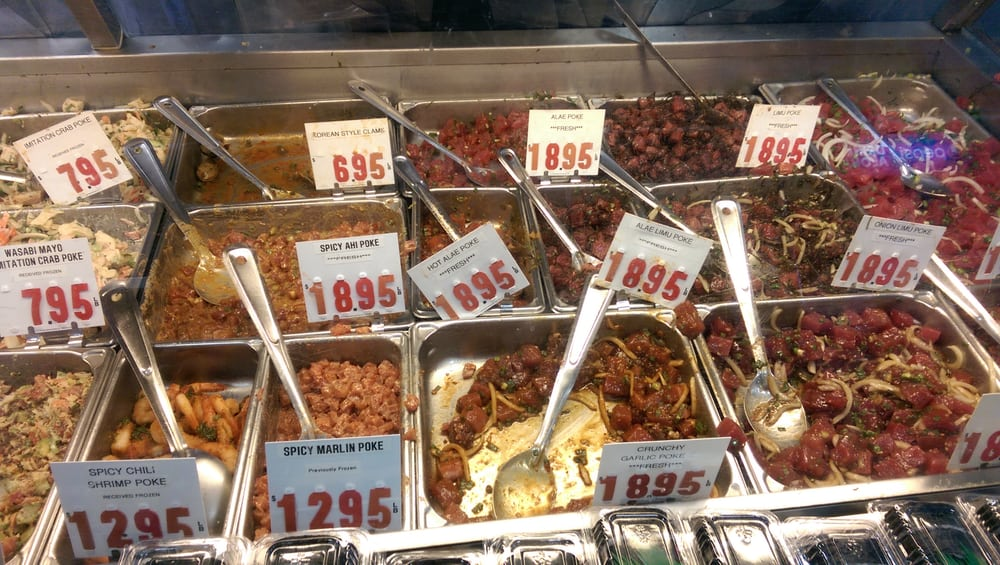
Poke counter with various types of poke

The traditional relish is ʻinamona, alaea salt, and limu. The most common flavor profile today is simply soy sauce and sesame oil, followed by additions of Maui onions and scallions, and ogo. Sriracha and mayonnaise are the base for the popular "spicy ahi".

Other additions include oyster sauce, ponzu, teriyaki sauce, chili peppers or crushed red peppers, sweet chili sauce, jalapeños, sea urchins or salmon roe, tobiko (or masago), chopped kimchi, ginger, shredded imitation crab, toasted sesame seeds, or wasabi (or hot mustard).

California roll poke includes avocado and cucumbers. Around 2020, the ginger-scallion condiment (geung yung) used in the Chinese dish cold ginger chicken has become a mildly popular poke flavor. Other ingredients include mushrooms, fried onions, cilantro, pineapple, edamame and a variety of other vegetables.

Hawaii Chef Alan Wong, another Hawaii Regional Cuisine founding member, was a guest judge on the show Top Chef was inspired by a contestant to create a similar Mediterranean-inspired ʻahi poke using lemons, lemon zest, capers, shiso and canned anchovies.

== Modern times ==
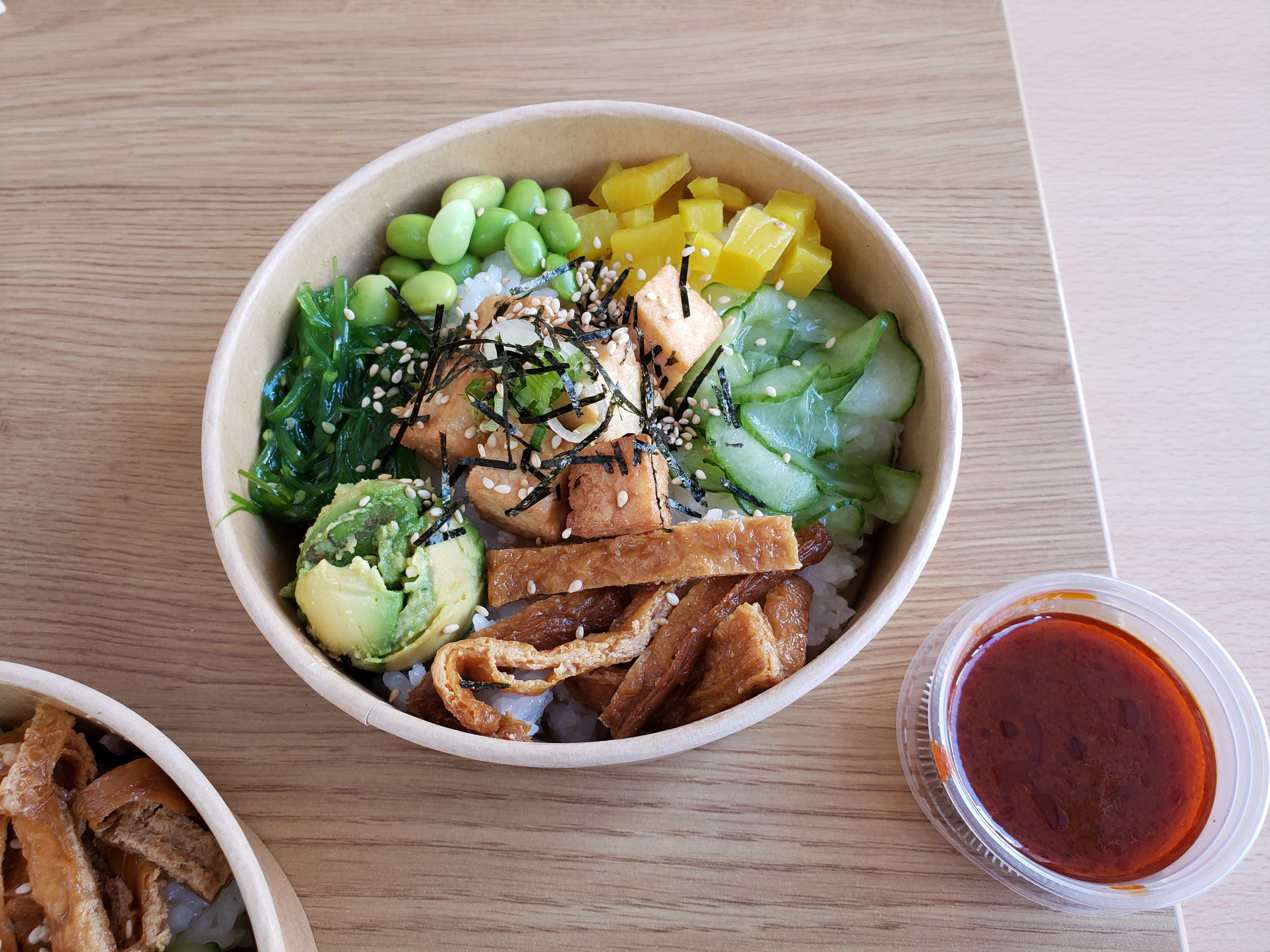
Many of the "poke bowls" found outside of Hawaii are more akin to Korean hoe-deopbap than Hawaiian-styled poke itself

Since the 1960s, most local grocery chains and standalone fish markets, and sometimes older superettes, in Hawaii have dedicated counters for poke where it is made in bulk and sold by weight. A few fast casual restaurants will prepare them made to order. Locally, a "poke bowl" means poke served over cooked rice. In dining restaurants, it is often served as like tartare (sans egg yolk) or tostada with chips of fried wonton wrappers or with prawn crackers, sometimes referred to as "poke nachos". In casual sushi restaurants, poke fills inari sushi.

Poke became increasingly popular in North America starting in 2012. From 2014 to mid-2016, "the number of Hawaiian restaurants on Foursquare, which includes those that serve poke," doubled, going from 342 to 700. Many of these restaurants serve both traditional and modern versions of the dish. A modern version of a poké bowl features fully customizable ingredients that are often carefully arranged like bibimbap, to allow the customer to mix the dish before consuming it.

One of these larger chains based in Chicago became embroiled in controversy in 2018, after it sent cease and desist letters to specific poke shops in Hawaii and on the mainland. Some Native Hawaiians told store owners to stop using the words "aloha" and "poke" in its business name. As a result, several shops were forced to rebrand their businesses.

The annual festival started in 1992 by Sam Choy still occurs, although going through a couple different hosts. In 2023, chefs Ronnie Rainwater and Aarón Sánchez were the guest judges at the competition. The first place prize offering in 2022 was a $1,000 cash prize and 6-night stay at the sponsoring hotel. Started in 2009, a 3-day "I Love Poke" festival is held annually in San Diego to celebrate the dish.

== Similar dishes ==
Raw fish dishes are not uncommon. Common throughout Oceania is ʻota ʻika (or poisson cru). There are also the European fish carpaccio and tartare, Chinese yu sheng, Korean hoe-deopbap, Latin American ceviche, and Japanese namerō, sashimi and tataki. In Inuit cuisine, fish is best eaten raw. Southeast Asian counterparts include Malaysian hinava and umai and Filipino kinilaw and kilawin, known as kelaguen in Guam.

The Ilocano dish poqui poqui, a scrambled egg dish with grilled eggplants and tomatoes, likely derived its name from poke, from returning Ilocano sakadas. (Note: Most of the Filipinos in Hawaii who arrived in the early 20th century to work in the sugar plantations were of Ilocano descent, known as sakadas, often referred to poke as kilawin (as opposed to kinilaw, a Tagalog term). Today, Ilocanos comprise 85% of the Filipinos in Hawaii.)

== See also ==
- Bibimbap
- Buddha bowl
- Crudo
- Hoe
- Kinilaw
- List of hors d'oeuvre
- List of raw fish dishes
- List of salads
- Lomi salmon
- 'Ota 'ika
- Sam Choy
- Singju
- Tataki
- Yusheng
- Cuisine of Hawaii
- Tamashiro Market
