= Pink salt =

Pink salt may refer to:

- Any salt that is pink in color
- Himalayan salt, a form of salt used in cooking or in bath products
- Alaea salt, an unrefined Hawaiian sea salt used in cooking or in rituals
- Curing salt, containing sodium nitrite and sodium chloride, used in the curing of meats
- (NH_{4})_{2}SnCl_{6}, a derivative of tin(IV) chloride
