= List of Hawaiian seafood =

This is a preliminary list of seafood used in Hawaiian cuisine.

== Raw ==
Commonly caught fish in Hawaiian waters for poke, found at local seafood counters include (alternate Japanese names are indicated in parentheses):

- ʻAhi pālaha: albacore tuna (tombo)
- ʻAhi: bigeye tuna (mebachi)
- ʻAhi: yellowfin tuna (kihada)
- Aku: skipjack tuna (katsuo)
- Aʻu: blue marlin (kajiki), striped marlin (nairagi), shortbill spearfish (hebi)
- Aʻu kū: broadbill swordfish (shutome)
- Aʻu lepe: sailfish
- Heʻe: octopus (tako)
- ʻOpihi: yellow foot, black foot

Other commercial caught local fish that can be eaten raw (for sashimi, poke or lomi) according to the FDA include:

(Hawaiian vernacular name followed by US market name)

- Aʻawa: hogfish
- ʻAha: needlefish
- Āholehole: flagtail
- Akule: bigeye scad
- ʻAlaʻihi: squirrelfish
- ʻAmaʻama: mullet
- ʻApi: whitespotted surgeonfish
- Auweke: goldsaddle goatfish
- Awa: milkfish
- ʻAweoweo: Hawaiian bigeye
- Ehu or ʻUlaʻula: squirrelfish snapper
- Hahalalū: juvenile bigeye scad
- Hāpuʻupuʻu: Hawaiian grouper
- Hilu: blackstripe coris
- Iheihe: halfbeaks
- Kāhala: amberjack
- Kākū: barracuda
- Kala: unicorn fish
- Kalekale: Von Siebold's snapper
- Kamanu: rainbow runner or Hawaiian salmon (hamachi)
- Kawakawa: mackerel tuna
- Kaweleʻā: Japanese barracuda
- Kole: yellow-eyed surgeonfish
- Kūmū: whitesaddle goatfish
- Kūpīpī: blackspot sergeant or grey damselfish
- Lai: Leatherback
- Mahi mahi: dolphinfish
- Māʻiʻiʻi: black brown surgeon/tang
- Maiko: bluelined surgeon
- Makiawa: herring or sardines
- Mākua: ocean sunfish
- Mālolo: flying fish
- Mamo: sergeant major damsel
- Manini: convict tang
- Moano: manybar goatfish
- Moi: threadfin
- Moi, deepsea: beardfish
- Monchong: pomfret
- Mu: porgy or bigeye emperor
- Mūheʻe: purpleback flying squid
- Naʻenaʻe: orangeband surgeon
- Nenue: rudderfish or chub
- Nūnū: trumpetfish
- ʻOʻopu kai or Nohu: scorpionfish
- ʻŌʻili: filefish, bluelined leatherjacket
- ʻŌʻio: bonefish
- Ono: wahoo
- Opah: moonfish
- ʻŌpakapaka: pink snapper, blue snapper, jobfish
- ʻŌpelu: mackerel scad
- Pākiʻi: flatfish or flounder
- Pākuʻikuʻi: Achilles tang
- Palani: Dussumier's surgeonfish
- Pānuhunuhu or Pānuʻu: Gaimard's parrotfish, juvenile parrotfish
- Papaʻi kualoa: Kona crab
- Poʻopaʻa: hawkfish
- Poʻou: rose-colored wrasse
- Pualu or Puwalu: elongate surgeonfish
- Puhi ūhā: white conger eel
- Roi: Argus grouper
- Samoan crab
- Ta'ape: common bluestripe snapper
- To'au: blacktail snapper
- ʻŪʻū: squirrelfish (menpachi)
- Uhu: mature parrotfish
- ʻŪkīkiki: Brigham's snapper (gindai)
- Uku: gray jobfish/snapper
- Ula: Hawaiian spiny lobster
- Ula pāpapa: slipper lobster
- ʻUlaʻula koaʻe: Longtail snapper (onaga)
- Ulua: mature thicklip trevally
- Ulua kihikihi: threadfin jack
- Uouoa: "false" mullet
- ʻUpāpalu: cardinalfish
- Walu: oilfish
- Weke: Samoan (white) goatfish

Kona kampachi (kanpachi) is farmed off the coast of the Island of Hawaii.

Most fresh shellfish, including octopus, can be safely consumed raw with caution but are often cooked (or at least cured) especially when being sold commercially as poke.

== Requires cooking ==
The "raw" seafoods listed above additionally can be cooked. The following have not been listed by the FDA safe for raw consumption, but are traditionally caught in Hawaii for consumption also:

- Awa ʻaua: Hawaiian ladyfish
- Hīnālea: wrasse
- Kala ʻōpelu: sleek unicornfish
- Laenihi: razorfish/ peacock wrasse (nabeta)
- Munu: doublebar/ island goatfish
- ʻŌmilu: bluefin trevally
- Ulua: African pompano (kagami)
- Ulua paʻopaʻo: golden trevally
- Weke moelua: Pfluger's goatfish

== See also ==
- Cuisine of Hawaii
