= Native cuisine of Hawaii =

Traditional Hawaiian cuisine

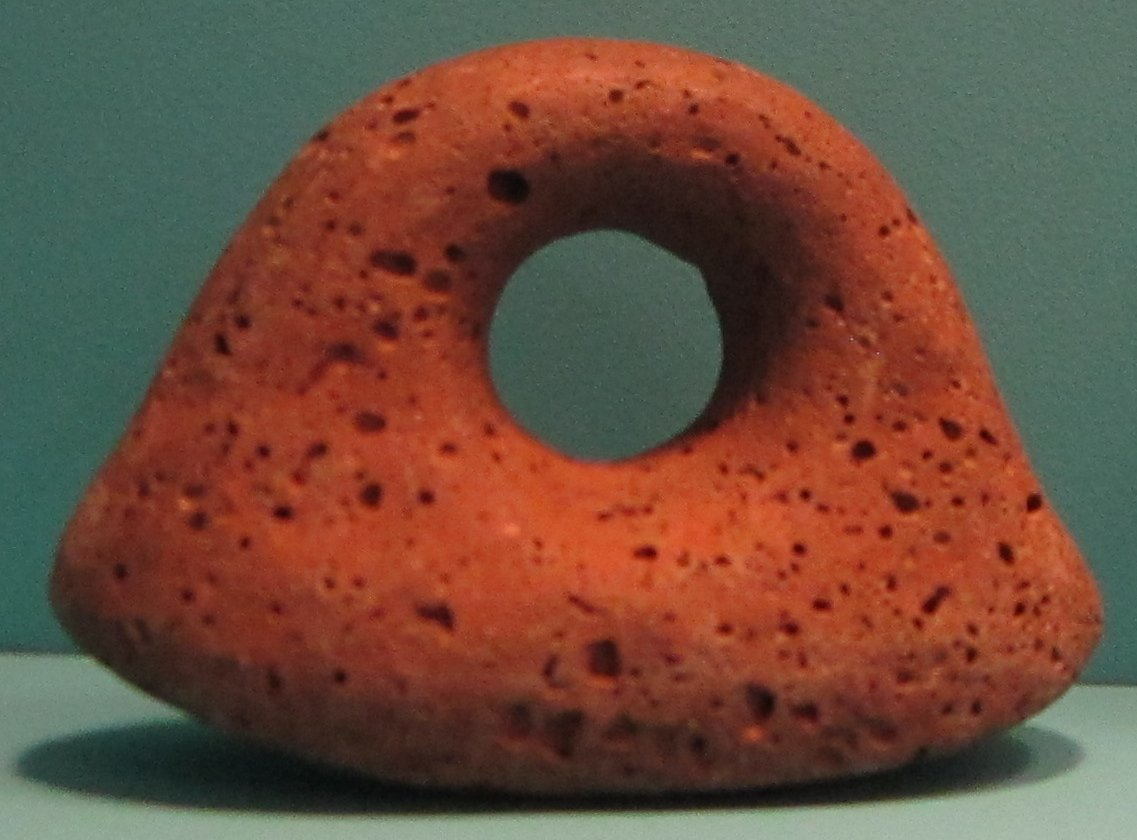
A lava rock poi pounder dated from the 18th century or earlier. (From the Honolulu Museum of Art's collection)

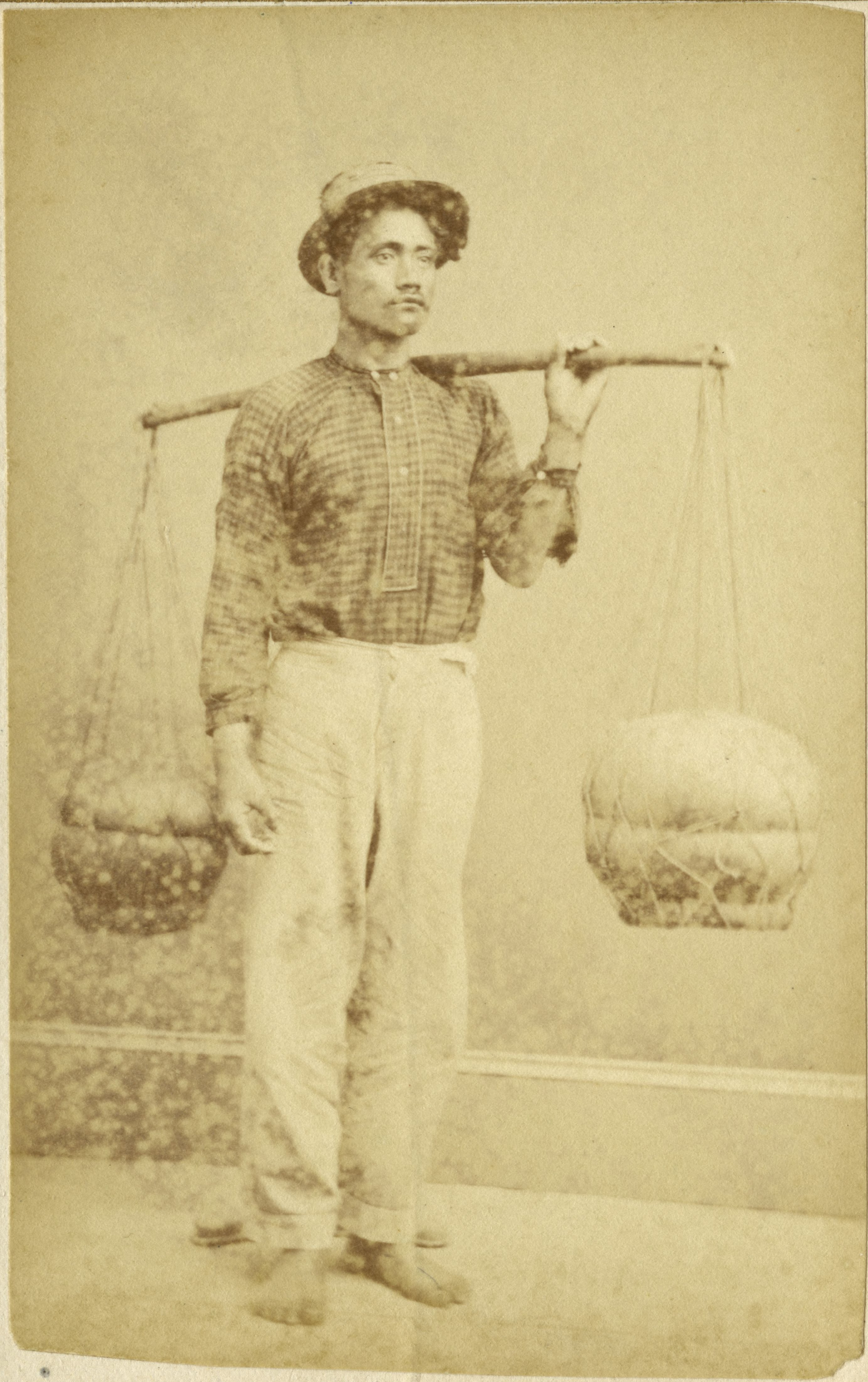
A Hawaiian poi dealer. Photograph by Menzies Dickson dated to between 1860 and 1870

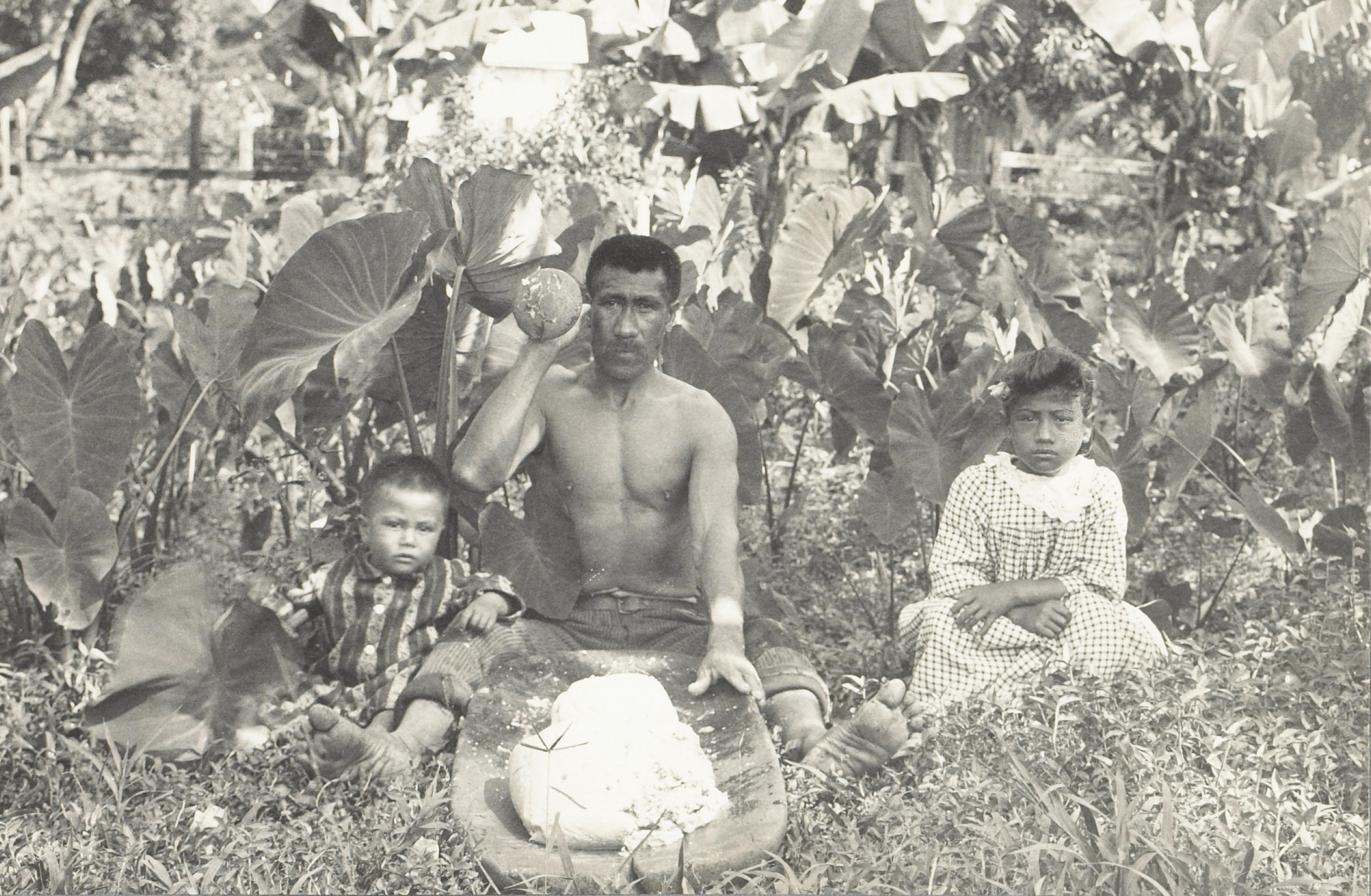
Pounding taro into poi. Taro plants can be seen growing in the background below the banana leaves

Native Hawaiian cuisine refers to the traditional foods of Hawaiʻi and its indigenous people that predate contact with Europeans and immigration from East and Southeast Asia. The cuisine consisted of a mix of indigenous plants and animals as well as plants and animals introduced by Polynesian voyagers, who became the Native Hawaiians.

== History ==
=== Voyagers and canoe foods ===
The date of the arrival of the earliest Polynesian seafarers to the Hawaiian Islands is under debate. Nonetheless, when they arrived, few edible plants were indigenous to Hawaiʻi aside from a few ferns and fruits that grew at higher elevations. Fish, shellfish, and limu are abundant in Hawaiʻi. Flightless birds were easy to catch and eggs from nests were also eaten. Most Pacific islands had no meat animals except bats and lizards. Various food-producing plants were introduced to the island by the migrating Polynesian peoples.

Botanists and archaeologists believe that these voyagers introduced anywhere from 27 to more than 30 plants to the islands, mainly for food. The most important of them was taro. For centuries, taro—and the poi made from it—was the main staple of the Hawaiian diet, and it is still much loved. ʻUala (sweet potatoes) and yams were also planted. The Marquesans, the first settlers from Polynesia, brought ʻulu (breadfruit) and the Tahitians later introduced the baking banana. Settlers from Polynesia also brought coconuts (niu) and sugarcane (kō); though it is of note that Hawaiians utilised less of the coconut due to the islands' milder climate yielding less abundant fruit compared to groves in the southern tropics.

Ancient Polynesians sailed the Pacific with pigs, chickens, and Polynesian dogs, and introduced them to the islands. Pigs were raised for religious sacrifice, and the meat was offered at altars, some of which was consumed by priests and the rest eaten in a mass celebration. The early Hawaiian diet was diverse, and may have included as many as 130 different types of seafood and 230 types of sweet potatoes. Some species of land and sea birds were consumed into extinction. The non-native species may have caused various birds, plants and land snails to go extinct.

Early Polynesian settlers brought along with them clothing, plants and livestock and established settlements along the coasts and larger valleys. Upon their arrival, the settlers grew kalo (taro), maiʻa (banana), niu (coconut), and ʻulu (breadfruit). Meats were eaten less often than fruits, vegetables, and seafood. Some did import and raise puaʻa (pork), moa (chicken), and ʻīlio (poi dog).

=== Ahupuaʻa ===
In ancient Hawaiʻi, communities divided into sections known as Ahupuaʻa. These were slices of land that typically stretched from the top of the mountain to the ocean. This division gave each community access to all natural resources the land could provide, and allowed each community to be largely self-sufficient. This division importantly gave communities access to streams running through the valleys down to the ocean, which allowed for construction of loʻi, irrigated mud patches that were used for kalo agriculture. In the spaces where the streams met the ocean, estuaries were adapted to fish ponds (aquaculture).

=== Culinary and cultural traditions ===
ʻAwa (Piper methysticum, kava) is a traditional food among Hawaiians. Breadfruit, sweet potato, kava, and heʻe (octopus) are associated with the four major Hawaiian gods: Kāne, Kū, Lono and Kanaloa.

Unlike other Polynesians that use particular seawater-based condiments or miti to salt their food while eating, Hawaiians independently developed ways of extracting dry salt (paʻakai, lit. "seawater solid") from the seawater in special pans (loʻi paʻakai); these industries flourished in Āliamanu (also named Āliapaʻakai or Salt Lake since industry establishment), and Kawaihae in Hawaiʻi as well as Hanapēpē in Kauaʻi. Only pans in Hanapēpē remain in the present day, but they are at risk from surrounding environmental pollution that can greatly affect final product quality. With this novel ingredient, Hawaiians learned to preserve caught seafood including fish and squid.

Other popular condiments include ʻinamona made of ground kukui nut, limu (seaweed), and kō (sugarcane), kō was consumed as both a sweet and a medicine.

Men did all of the cooking, and food for women was cooked in a separate imu; afterwards men and women ate meals separately per the ancient kapu (taboo) of separating the genders for meals. This kapu was abolished in 1819 at the death of King Kamehameha I by his wife Kaʻahumanu. The ancient practice of cooking with the imu continues for special occasions and is popular with tourists.

Vegetables were a significant portion of the meal, often boiled in a special method called the hakui where hot stones are dropped into calabashes (ipu) and covered until the contents have cooked.

Thespesia populnea wood was used to make food bowls.

Cyanea angustifolia was eaten in times of food scarcity. It and the now endangered Cyanea platyphylla are known in Hawaiian as hāhā.

There is no fighting when eating from a bowl of poi. It is shared and is connected to the concept because Hāloa, the first-born son of the parents who begat the human race. Hawaiians identify strongly with kalo/taro so much that the Hawaiian term for family ʻohana is derived from ʻohā referring to shoots or suckers growing from the kalo corm: as young shoots grow from the corm, so people too grow from their family.

== Ingredients ==
=== Staple ingredients ===
- Kalo (Taro) was the primary staple food in the Native Hawaiian diet. The tubers are grown in loʻi kalo, terraced mud patches often utilizing spring-fed or stream irrigation. Kalo are typically steamed and eaten in chunks or pounded into paʻiai or poi. Additionally, the leaves are also utilized as wrappings for other foods for steaming.
- ʻUala (Sweet potato) was another common staple crop that was introduced by the first Polynesians to voyage to Hawaiʻi. The potato required much less water to cultivate than kalo, so it was important in regions that lacked sufficient precipitation for construction of loʻi kalo. ʻUala can be prepared in similar ways to kalo, including steaming, boiling, or cooked in an imu with other foods.
- ʻUlu (Breadfruit) was the last of the three staple crops that were introduced to Hawaiʻi by the Polynesians. ʻUlu fruits grow on trees, unlike the previous two staple crops, kalo and ʻuala, which are grown in the ground. These varied agricultural needs allowed the Native Hawaiians to have a good level of resistance and resilience to seasonal changes in precipitation. ʻUlu is a starchy fruit and can be prepared in similar ways to ʻUala and Kalo.
- Iʻa (fish) and other seafood such as Opihi (limpets) and Wana (sea urchin) were a large part of the Native Hawaiian diet, as the reef ecosystems surrounding the Hawaiian islands made for an abundant food source. Seafood was largely eaten raw and seasoned with sea salt and limu (seaweed). This preparation gave birth to the now popular dish poke.
- Hāpuʻu ʻiʻi, (Hawaiian tree fern) (Cibotium menziesii) is an example of a food endemic to the Hawaiian Islands that was not introduced by the Polynesian voyagers. The uncoiled fronds (fiddles) are eaten boiled. The starchy core of the ferns was considered a famine food or used as pig feed. It was prepared by peeling the young fronds or placing the entire trunk with the starchy center in an ʻimu or volcanic steam vents. A saying was "He hāpuʻu ka ʻai he ai make" (If the hāpuʻu is the food, it is the food of death).
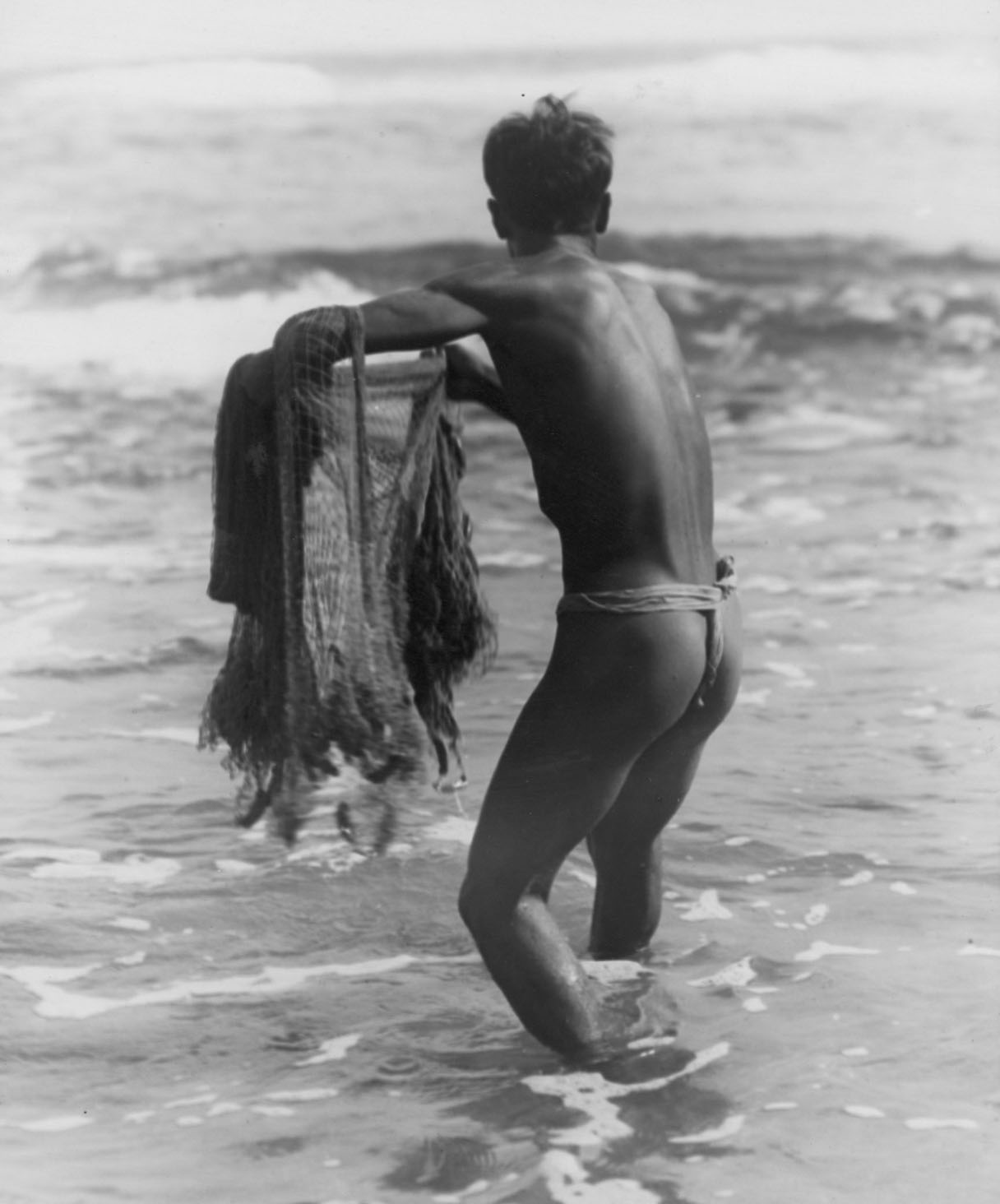
Fish were caught in near-shore reefs and tidepools using spears and nets

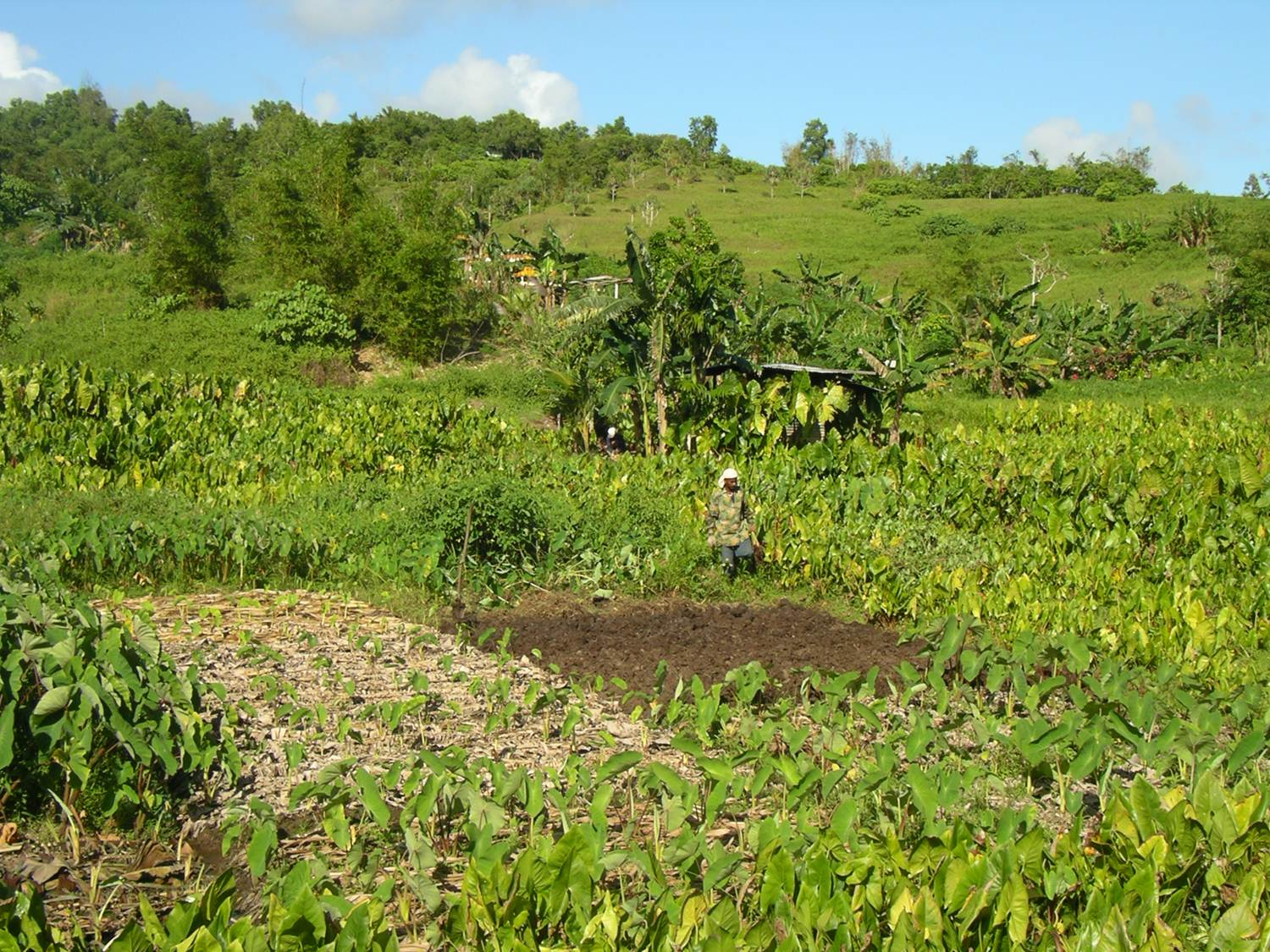
Loʻi Kalo (taro patches) were used to grow Kalo, the staple of the Hawaiian Diet.

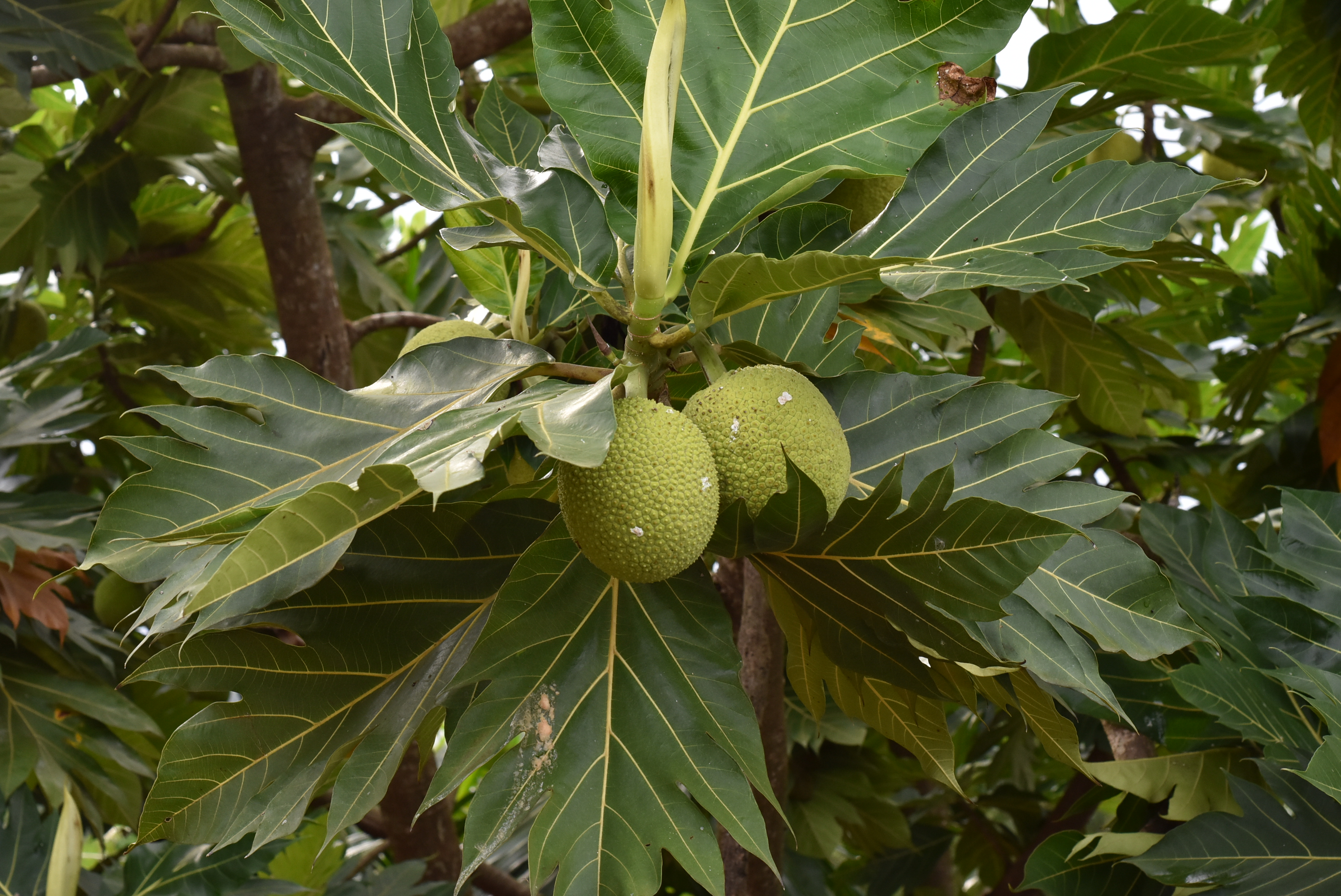
ʻUlu (Breadfruit) were another starchy staple food in the Hawaiian diet.

=== Royal and celebratory ingredients ===
Certain foods were eaten primarily by the royalty and nobility. These were also sometimes consumed by common people. These include Puaʻa (pig), Moa (chicken) and ʻĪlio (dog). All of these animals were introduced to Hawaiʻi, which prior to Polynesian voyagers did not have any large mammals. Pigs were hunted, while chickens and dogs were raised domestically. Animals were slow-cooked primarily in imu, or underground ovens made by burying food with hot rocks and banana wood. They were also often cooked by cutting the animal open, filling its body with hot rocks, and wrapping it in ti, banana, and kalo leaves.

== Dishes and preparations ==
Most cooked foods eaten by Native Hawaiians, were prepared either through steaming, boiling, or slow cooking in underground ovens known as imu. Due to their lack of non-flammable cooking vessels, steaming and boiling were achieved by heating rocks in fires and placing the hot rocks in bowls of water. Many other foods, such as fruits and most seafood, were eaten raw.

- Kālua, pig cooked underground in an imu.
- Poi (pronounced po-ee) is made from cooked, mashed, and sometimes lightly fermented taro. It is the starch staple of the native Hawaiian diet.
- Laulau is made with beef, pork, or chicken and salted butterfish wrapped in taro leaves and then ti leaves. It was traditionally prepared in an imu.
- Poke is a raw marinated fish or other seafood salad (such as ahi poke or octopus poke). It is made with sea salt, seaweed, kukui nut oil and in more recent times with soy sauce and sesame oil.
- Lūʻau is made with coconut milk cooked with taro leaves in a pot. It has a creamy consistency. Squid is usually cooked with this dish, but chicken is sometimes substituted for the squid.
- Haupia is a flan like dessert made with coconut milk and ground arrowroot. Cornstarch has become a widespread substitute for the arrowroot.
- Koʻele palau is a dessert made from cooked sweet potato mashed and mixed with coconut milk.
- Inamona is a traditional relish or condiment often accompanied meals and is made of roasted and mashed kukui nutmeats, and sea salt. It sometimes mixed with edible seaweed.
- Kulolo is a pudding dessert made from grated taro corm and coconut milk that's baked in an imu, having a fudge-like consistency.
- Piele is another Hawaiian pudding similar to Kulolo, with grated sweet potato or breadfruit mixed with coconut cream and baked.

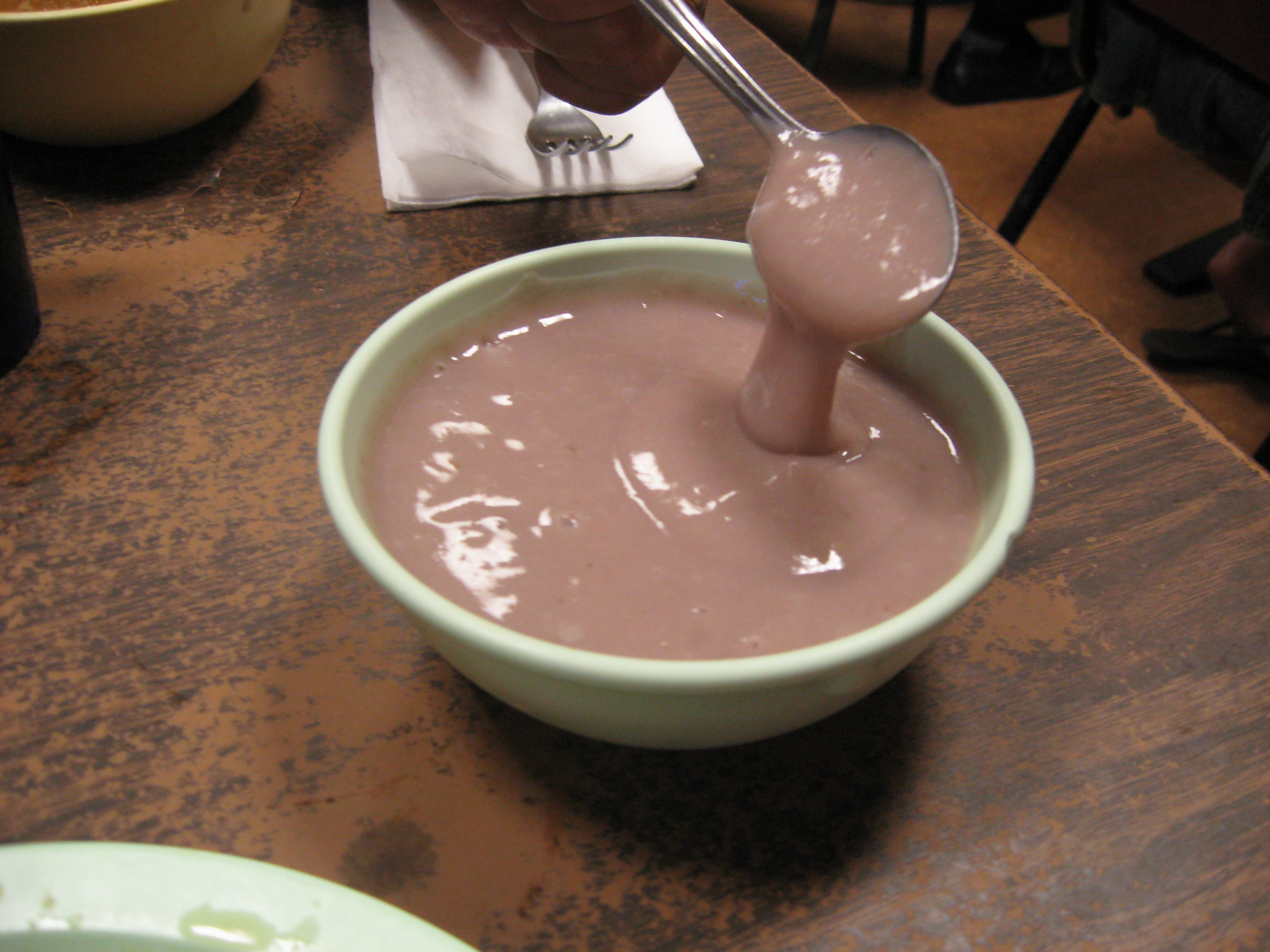
A bowl of poi showing its viscous consistency

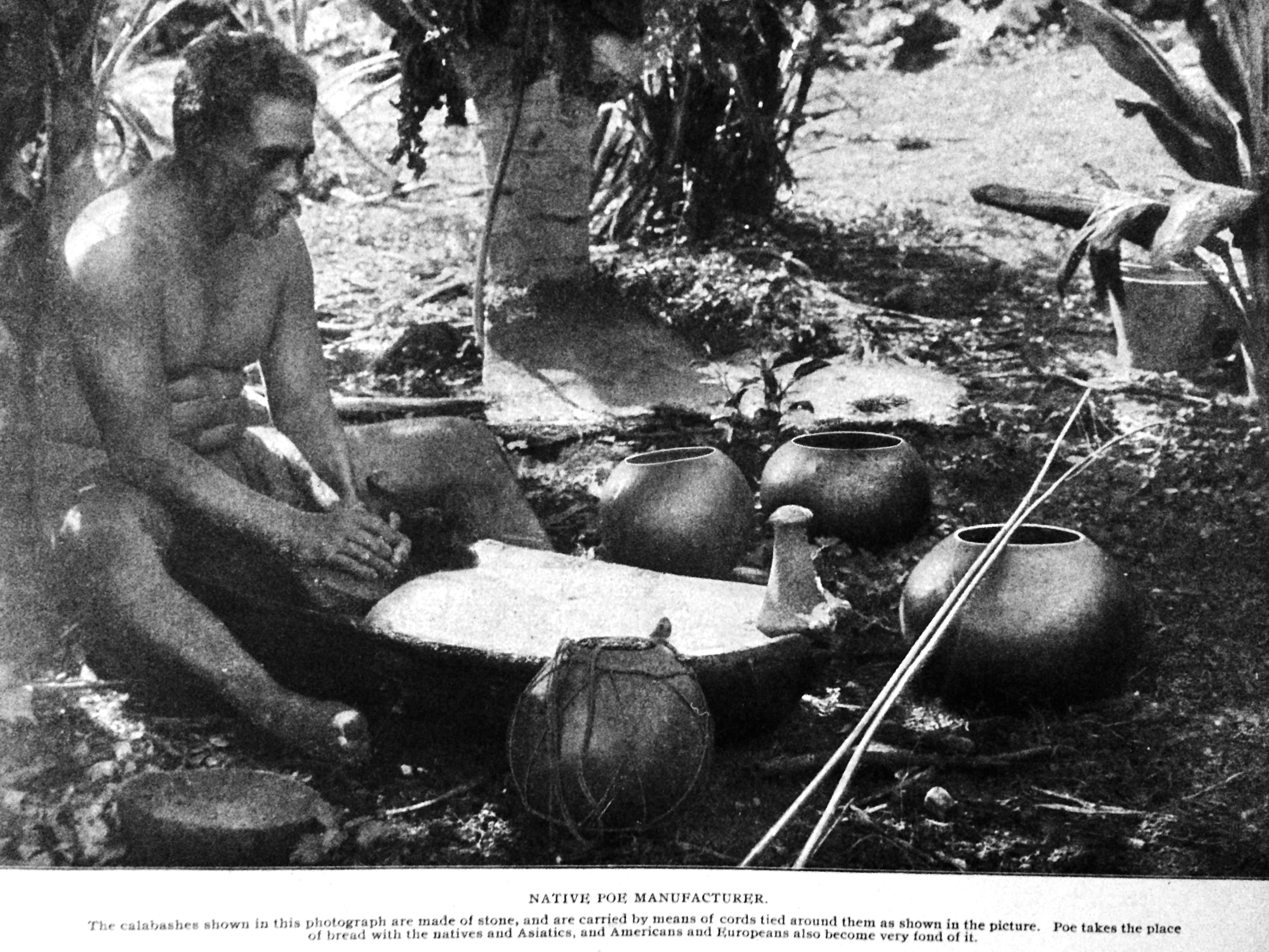
An 1899 photo of a man making poi

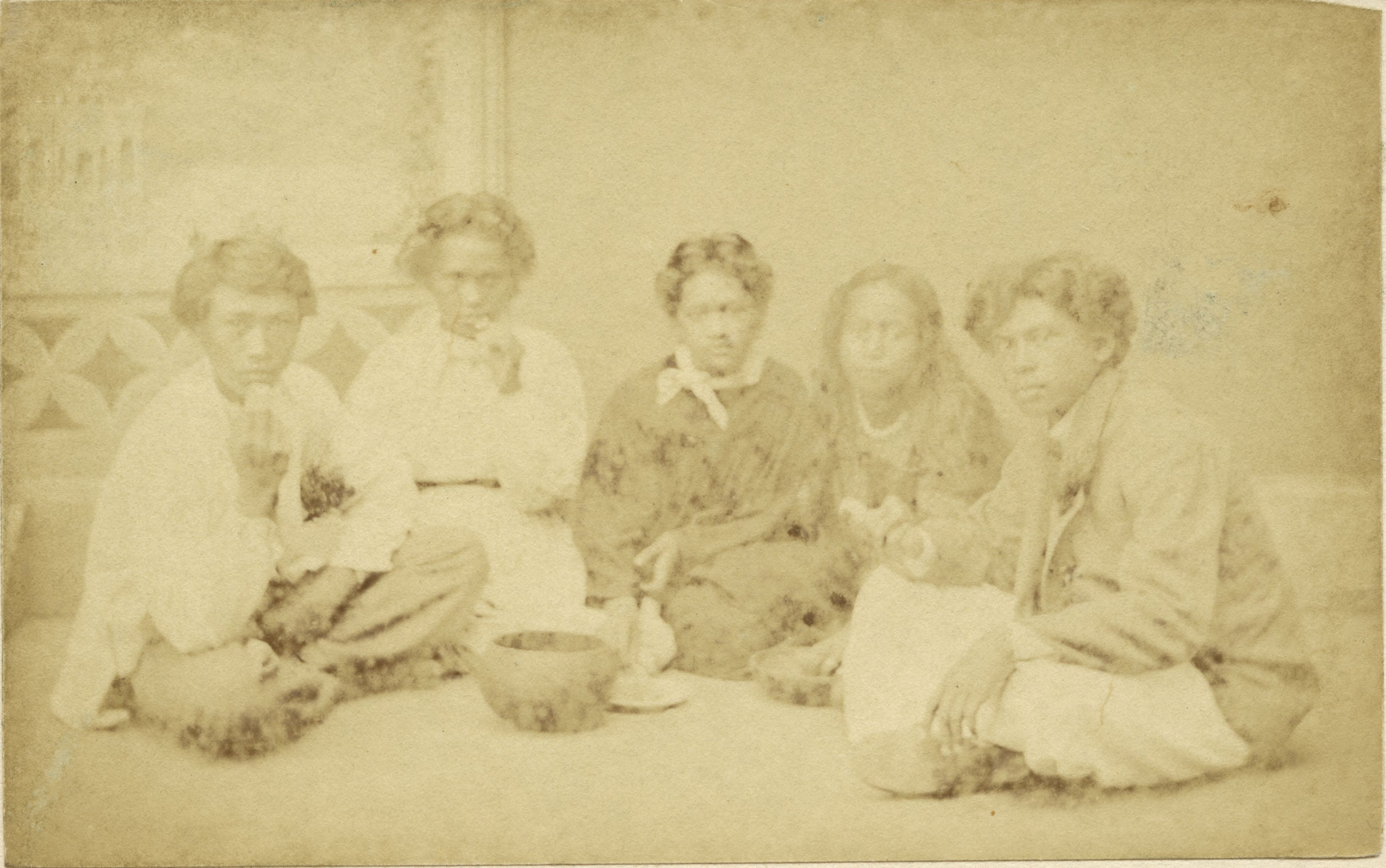
Hawaiians eating poi in a photo by Menzies Dickson circa 1870. Dickson was a pioneering photographer on the islands who captured some of the earliest images of Hawaiian people

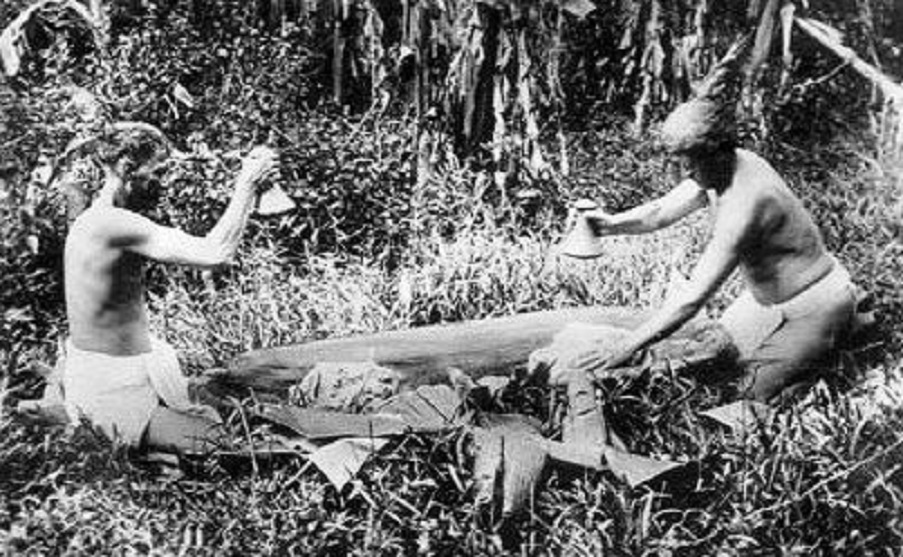
Men pounding poi in 1890

== Festivals and special occasions ==
On important occasions, a traditional ʻahaʻaina feast was held. When a woman was to have her first child, her husband started raising a pig for the ʻahaʻaina mawaewae feast that was celebrated for the birth of a child. Besides the pig, mullet, shrimp, crab, seaweed, and taro leaves were required for the feast.

The modern name for such feasts, lūʻau, was not used until 1856, replacing the Hawaiian words ʻahaʻaina and pāʻina. The name lūʻau came from the name of a food always served at a ʻahaʻaina, young taro tops baked with coconut milk and chicken or octopus.

Pigs and dogs were killed by strangulation or by holding their nostrils shut in order to conserve the animal's blood. Meat was prepared by flattening out the whole eviscerated animal and broiling it over hot coals, or it was spitted on sticks. Large pieces of meat, such as fowl, pigs and dogs, would be typically cooked in earth ovens, or spitted over a fire during ceremonial feasts.

Hawaiian earth ovens, known as an imu, combine roasting and steaming in a method called kālua. A pit is dug into earth and lined with volcanic rocks and other rocks that do not split when heated to a high temperature, such as granite. A fire is built with embers, and when the rocks are glowing hot, the embers are removed and the foods wrapped in ti, ginger or banana leaves are put into the pit, covered with wet leaves, mats and a layer of earth. Water may be added through a bamboo tube to create steam.

The intense heat from the hot rocks cooked food thoroughly—the quantity of food for several days could be cooked at once, taken out and eaten as needed, and the cover replaced to keep the remainder warm. Sweet potatoes, taro, breadfruit and other vegetables were cooked in the imu, as well as fish. Saltwater eel was salted and dried before being put into the imu. Chickens, pigs and dogs were put into the imu with hot rocks inserted in the abdominal cavities.

Paʻina is the Hawaiian word for a meal and can also be used to refer to a party or feast. One tradition that includes paʻina is the four-month-long Makahiki ancient Hawaiian New Year festival in honor of the god Lono (referred to as the sweet potato god) of the Hawaiian religion.

=== Makahiki ===
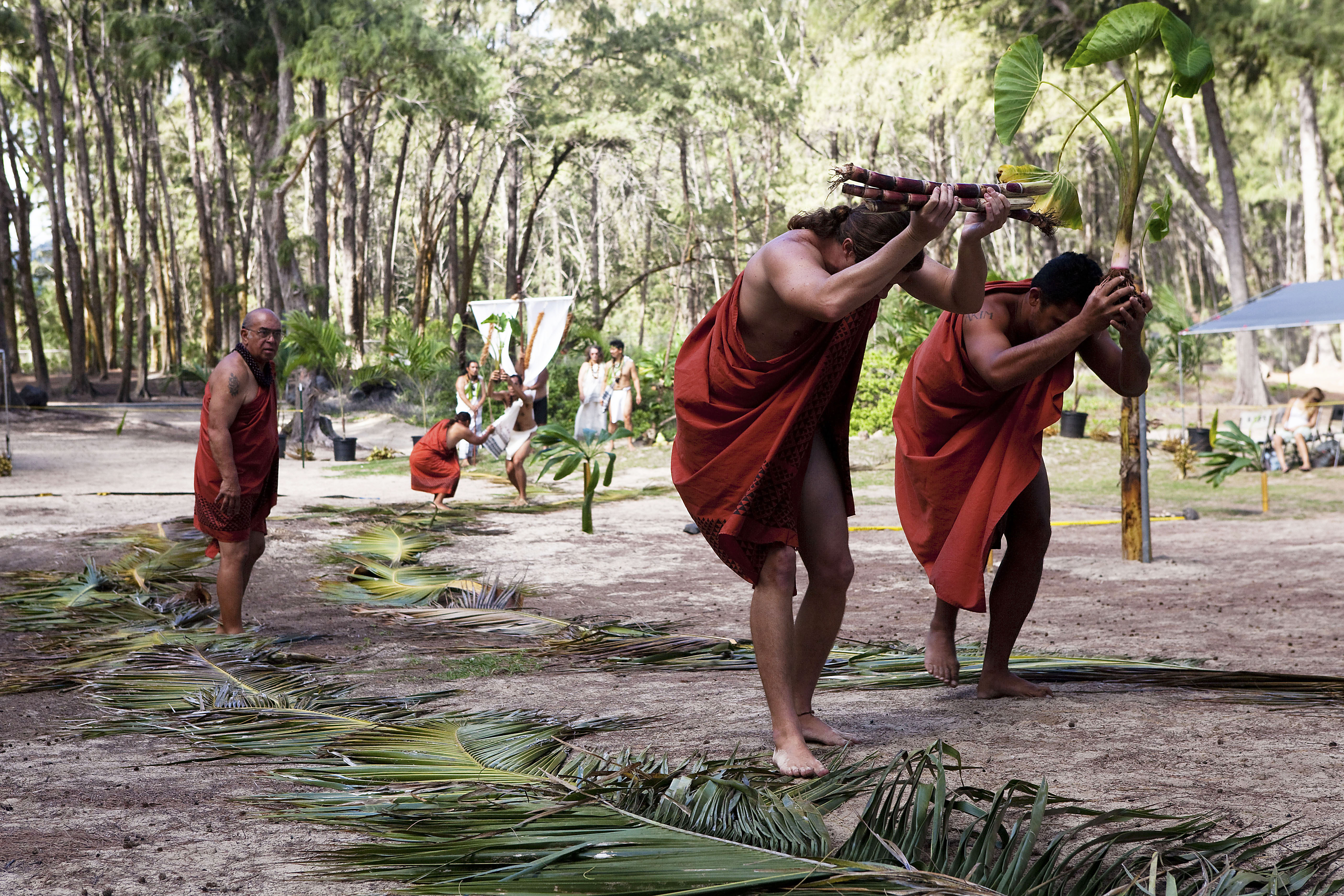
Procession offering gifts to Lono during the hoʻokupu protocol presentation of a Makahiki festival

Makahiki includes a first phase of spiritual cleansing and making hoʻokupu offerings to the gods. The Konohiki, a class of royalty that at this time of year provided the service of tax collector, collected agricultural and aquacultural products such as pigs, taro, sweet potatoes, dry fish, kapa and mats. Some offerings were in the form of forest products such as feathers.

The Hawaiian people had no money or other similar medium of exchange. The goods were offered on the altars of Lono at heiau—temples—in each district around the island. Offerings also were made at the ahu, stone altars set up at the boundary lines of each community. All war was outlawed to allow unimpeded passage of the image of Lono.

The festival proceeded in a clockwise circle around the island as the image of Lono (Akua Loa, a long pole with a strip of tapa and other embellishments attached) was carried by the priests. At each ahupuaʻa (each community also is called an ahupuaʻa) the caretakers of that community presented hoʻokupu to the Lono image, a fertility god who caused things to grow and who gave plenty and prosperity to the islands.

The second phase of celebration includes: hula dancing, sports (boxing, wrestling, Hawaiian lava sledding, javelin marksmanship, bowling, surfing, canoe races, relays, and swimming), singing, and feasting. In the third phase, the waʻa ʻauhau (tax canoe) was loaded with hoʻokupu and taken out to sea where it was set adrift as a gift to Lono.

At the end of the Makahiki festival, the chief would go off shore in a canoe. When he came back in he stepped on shore and a group of warriors threw spears at him. He had to deflect or parry the spears to prove his worthiness to continue to rule.

== Legacy of traditional Hawaiian cuisine ==
Native Hawaiian dishes have evolved and been integrated into contemporary fusion cuisine. Apart from lūʻau for tourists, native Hawaiian cuisine is less common than other ethnic cuisine in parts of Hawaiʻi, but restaurants such as Helena's Hawaiian Food and Ono Hawaiian Foods specialize in traditional Hawaiian food.

== See also ==
- Cuisine of Hawaiʻi
- List of Hawaiian dishes
- List of regional dishes of the United States
