= Poi (Hawaiian food) =

Traditional staple food in the Polynesian diet

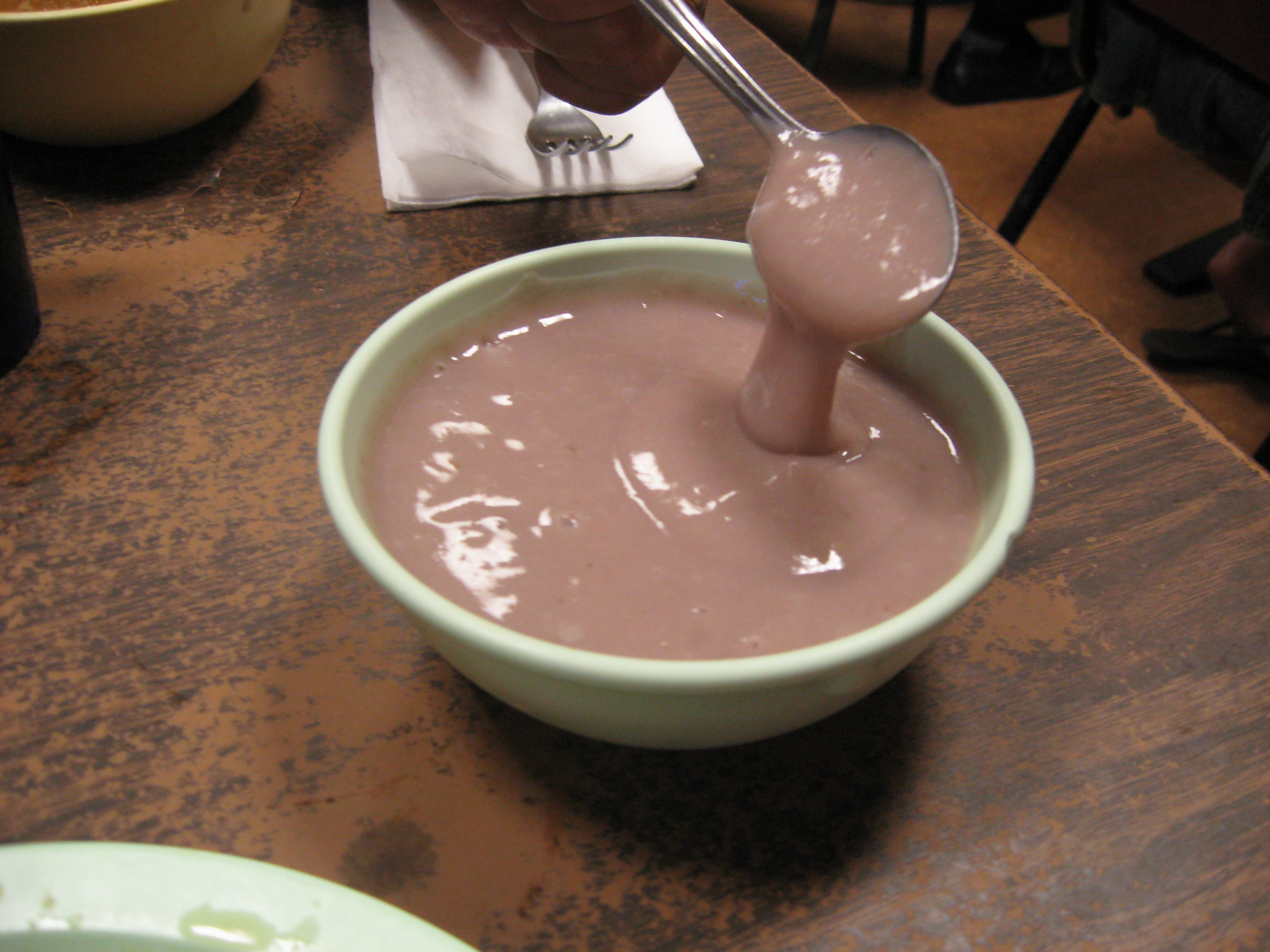
- A bowl of poi showing typical consistency
- Alternative names: Popoi
- Type: Purée
- Place of origin: French Polynesia
- Region or state: Cook Islands, French Polynesia, Hawaii
- Main ingredients: Starchy vegetable, mostly swamp taro

Poi or popoi is a traditional staple food in the Polynesian diet, made from taro. Traditional poi is produced by mashing cooked taro on a wooden pounding board (papa kuʻi ʻai), with a carved pestle (pōhaku kuʻi ʻai) made from basalt, calcite, coral, or wood.

Modern methods use an industrial food processor to produce large quantities for retail distribution. This initial paste is called paʻi ʻai. Water is added to the paste during mashing, and again just before eating, to achieve the desired consistency, which can range from highly viscous to liquid.

In Hawaii, this is informally classified as either "one-finger", "two-finger", or "three-finger", alluding to how many fingers are required to scoop it up (the thicker the poi, the fewer fingers required to scoop a sufficient mouthful).

Poi can be eaten immediately, when fresh and sweet, or left to ferment and become sour, developing a smell reminiscent of plain yogurt. A layer of water on top can prevent fermenting poi from developing a crust.

== History and culture ==
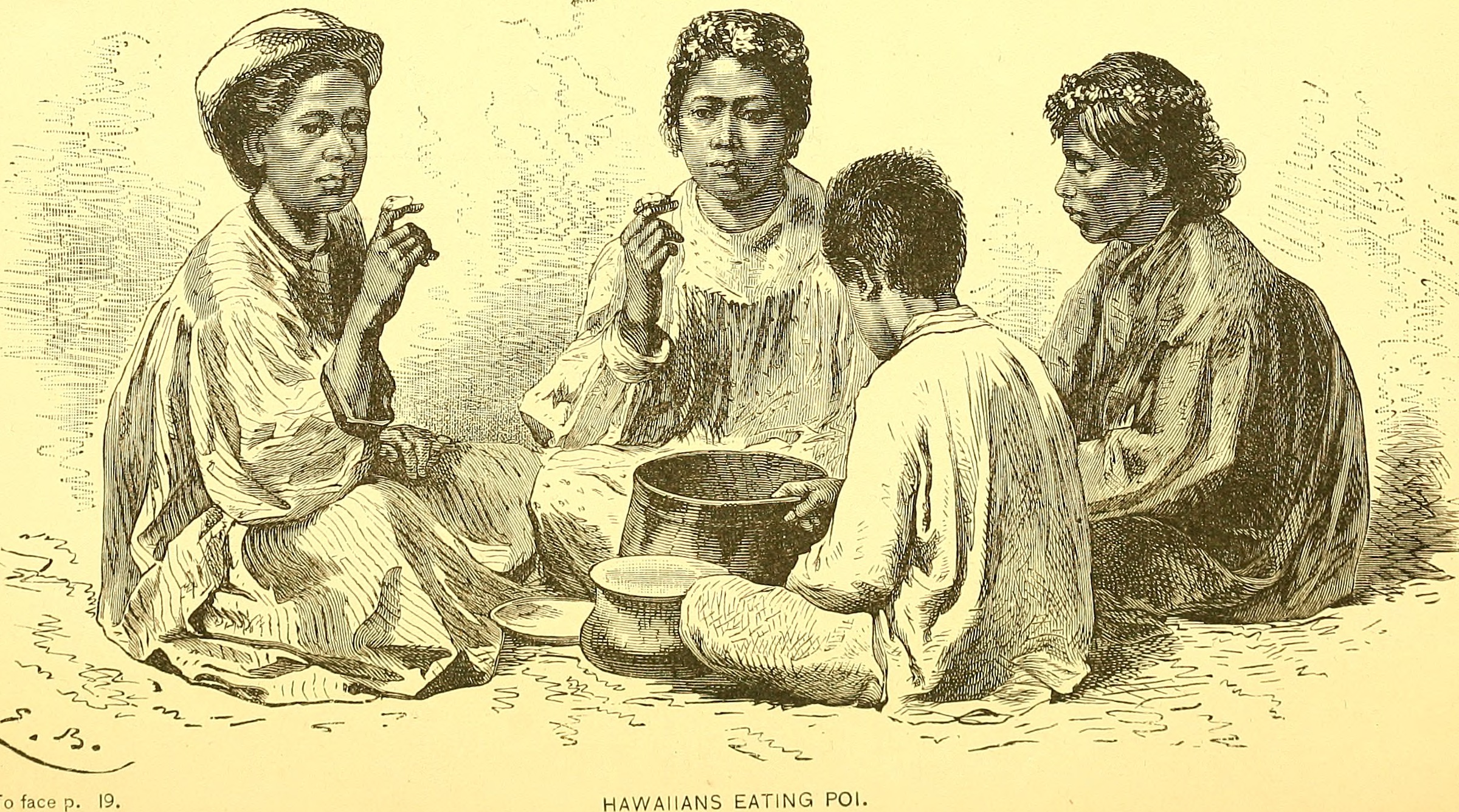
Hawaiians eating poi (1889)

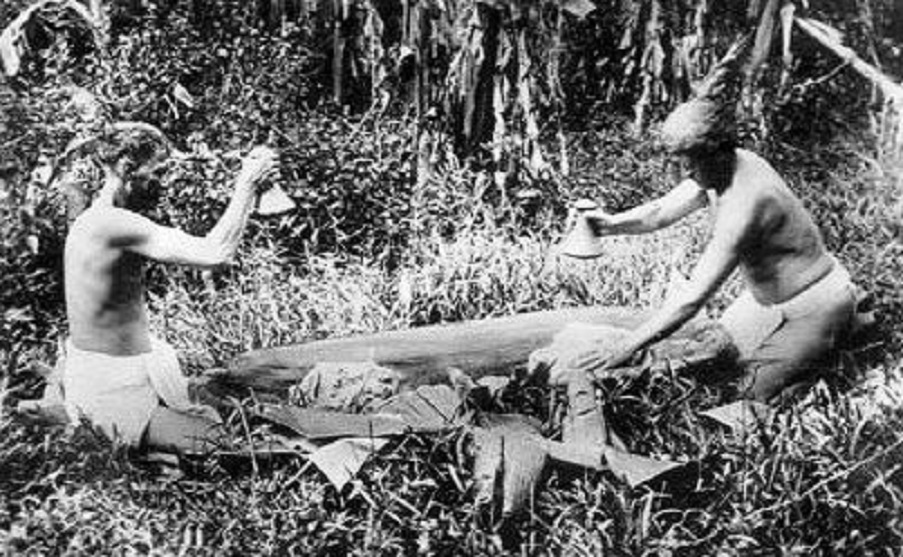
Hawaiian men pounding taro (circa 1890)

Poi is thought to have originated in the Marquesas Islands, created some time after initial settlement from Polynesian explorers. While mashing food does occur in other parts of the Pacific, the method involved was more rudimentary. In western Polynesia, the cooked starch was mashed in a wooden bowl using a makeshift pounder out of either the stem of a coconut leaf or a hard, unripe breadfruit with several wooden pegs stuck into it. The origins of poi coincided with the development of basalt pounders in the Marquesas, which soon spread elsewhere in eastern Polynesia, with the exception of New Zealand and Easter Island.

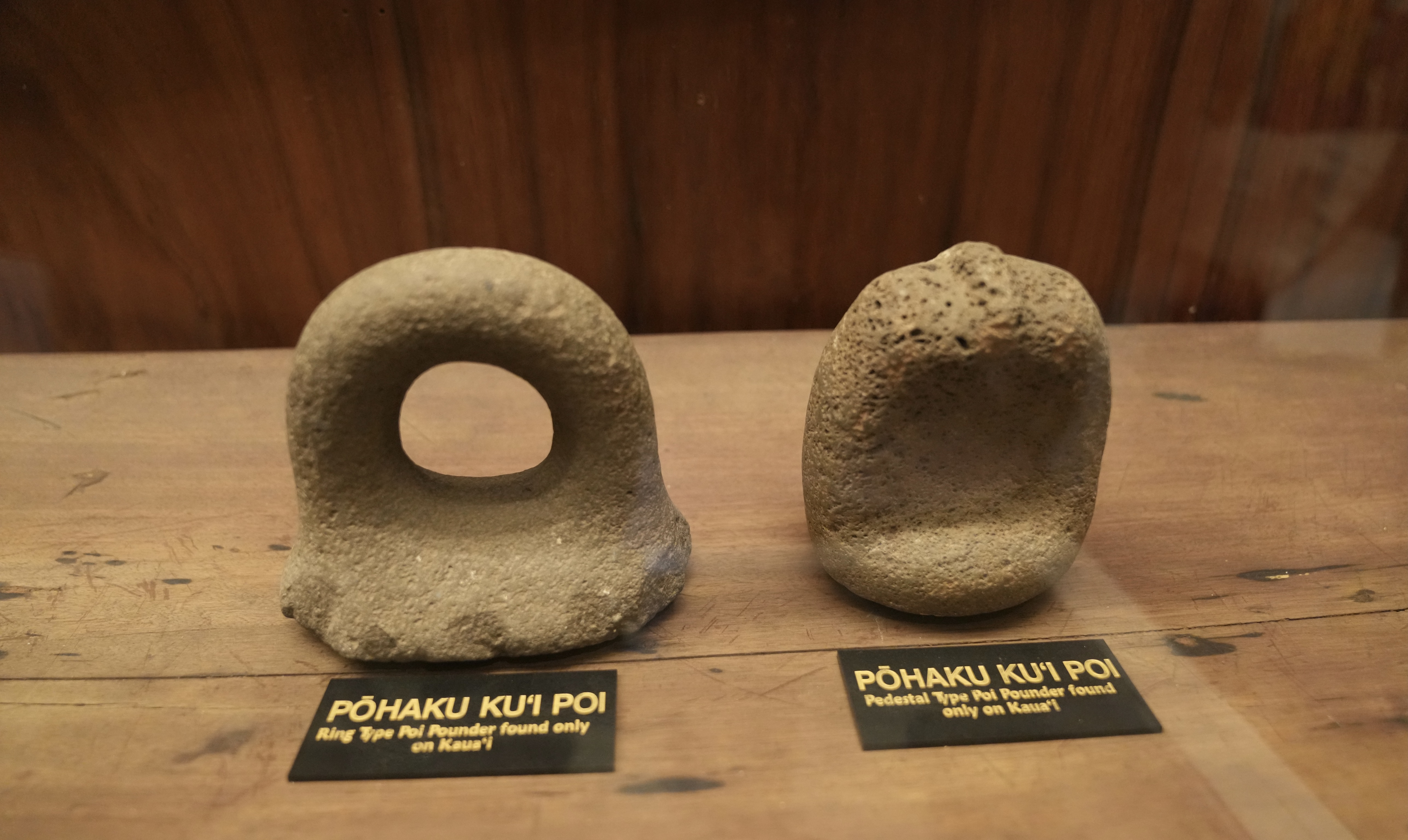
Ring-type and pedestal-type poi pounders found only on the island of Kauai on display at the Kauai Museum

Poi was considered such an important and sacred aspect of daily Hawaiian life that Hawaiians believed that the spirit of Hāloa, the legendary ancestor of the Hawaiian people, was present when a bowl of poi was uncovered for consumption at the family dinner table. Accordingly, all conflict among family members was required to come to an immediate halt.

Hawaiians traditionally cook the starchy, potato-like heart of the taro corm for hours in an underground oven called an imu, which is also used to cook other types of food such as pork, carrots, and sweet potatoes. Breadfruit can also be made into poi (i.e. poi ʻulu), but Hawaiians consider this inferior in taste to poi made from taro.

== Fermentation ==
Poi has a paste-like texture and a delicate flavor when freshly prepared in the traditional manner, with a pale purple color that naturally comes from the taro corm. It has a smooth, creamy texture. The flavor changes distinctly once the poi has been made; fresh poi is sweet and edible; each day thereafter, the poi loses sweetness and turns sour due to a natural fermentation that involves Lactobacillus bacteria, yeasts, and Geotrichum fungi. Therefore, some people find fermented poi more palatable if it is mixed with milk or sugar or both. The speed of this fermentation process depends upon the bacterial level present in the poi, but the souring process can be slowed by storing poi in a cool, dark location.

To prepare commercial poi that has been stored in a refrigerator, it is squeezed out of the bag into a bowl (sometimes adding water), and a thin layer of water is put over the part exposed to air to keep a crust from forming on top. New commercial preparations of poi require refrigeration, but stay fresh longer and taste sweeter.

Sour poi is still edible, but may be less palatable, and is usually served with salted fish or Hawaiian lomi salmon on the side (as in the lyrics "my fish and poi"). Sourness can be prevented by freezing or dehydrating fresh poi, although the resulting poi after defrosting or rehydrating tends to taste bland when compared to the fresh product. Sour poi has an additional use as a cooking ingredient with a sour flavor (similar to buttermilk), usually in breads and rolls.

== Nutrition and dietary and medical uses ==
Taro is low in fat, high in vitamin A, and abounds in complex carbohydrates.

Poi has been used specifically as a milk substitute for babies, or as a baby food. It is supposed to be easy to digest. It contains no gluten, making it safe to eat for people who have celiac disease or a gluten intolerance.

== See also ==
- List of ancient dishes and foods
- Fufu – West African dish made from mashed cassava, yams, plantain, and taro
- Nilupak – Filipino delicacies made from mashed starchy foods
