= Namerō =

Type of tataki

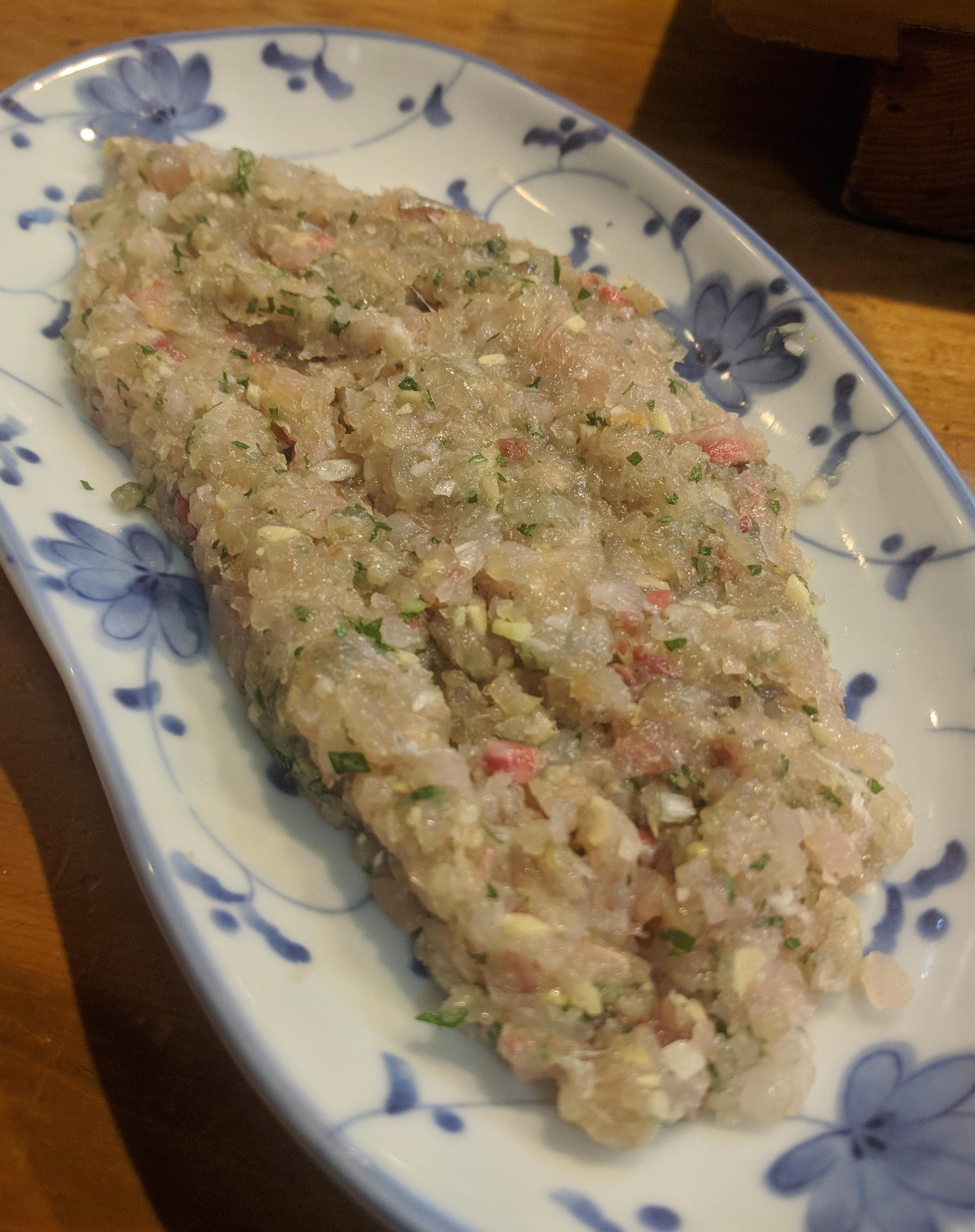
Namerō made from Japanese amberjack served in a sushi restaurant in Tateyama, Chiba Prefecture.

Namerō (Japanese: なめろう; derived from 舐める nameru, "to lick") is a type of tataki, a manner of preparing fish or meat finely minced and mixed with some spices and seasonings, not unlike a tartare.

This recipe has been passed down among Bōsō Peninsula fishermen.

== Variations ==
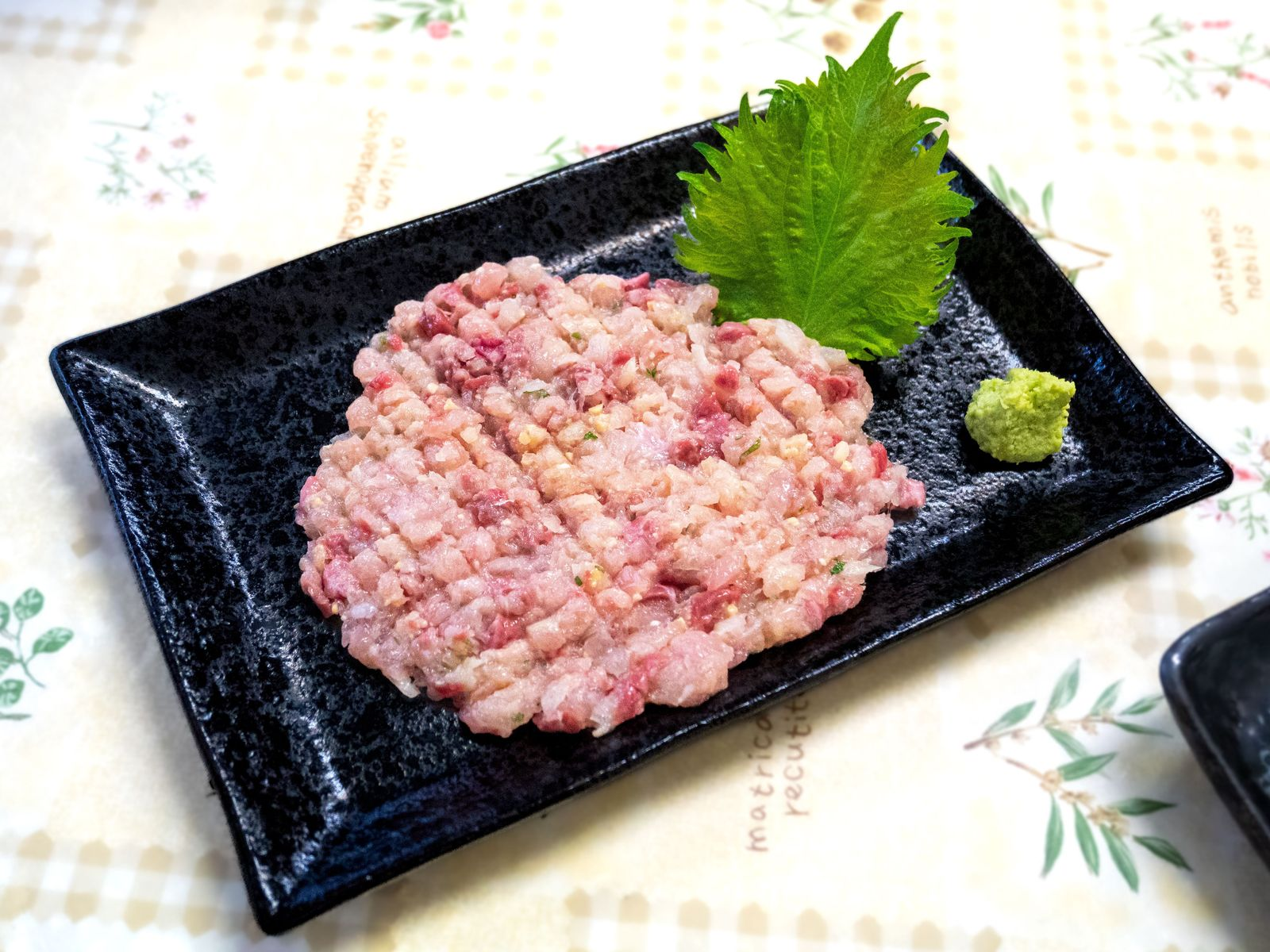

=== Sangayaki ===
A dish of grilled namerō is called sangayaki (さんが焼き) or simply sanga. Namerō is grilled directly on an iron griddle, stuffed into scallop or abalone shells or wrapped in sarutoriibara or camellia leaves. Like namerō, it is said to have originated in the Bōsō Peninsula, and there are places specializing in sangayaki.

There are three theories about the original kanji spelling and origin story of the name, and the Ministry of Agriculture, Forestry and Fisheries has adopted the first one (山家焼き) shown here:

1. 山家焼き spelling: Namerō was grilled or steamed by fishermen in the mountain huts and was eaten, so it was called 'mountain' (山) and 'house' (家) 'fry' (焼き).
2. 山河焼き spelling: The spelling of "Sangayaki" derived from using both ingredients from the mountains (山) and rivers (河).
3. 三辛焼き spelling: The spelling derived from the use of three (三) spicy (辛) foods: ginger, green onion, and perilla.

=== Others ===
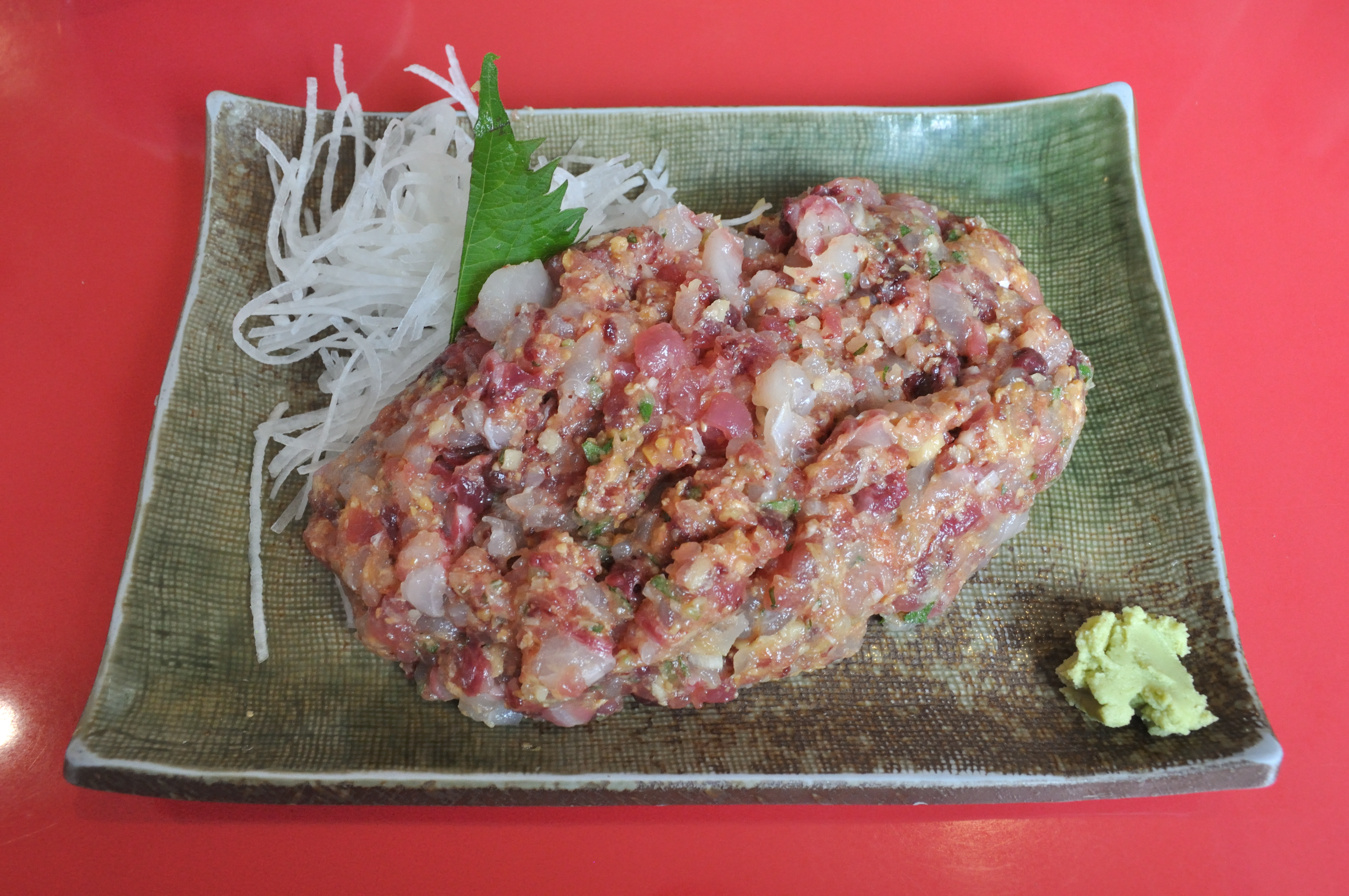

- A cold dish made by putting namerō in ice water is called mizunamasu (水なます).
- Namerō placed on top of rice, with green tea is poured over it to make chazuke, is called magocha (孫茶). Magocha is a local dish of the coastal area of the Izu Peninsula, where it is not seared but is served with dashi stock on the sashimi. In addition to horse mackerel, sashimi can be made from tuna, bonito, and alfonsino, depending on the location and restaurant.
- Around Isumi District, Chiba Prefecture, namerō is placed on a slightly deep plate, flattened, sanbaizu (vinegar, soy sauce, and sugar in 1:1:1 proportions) is added, and chilled in a refrigerator. This is aimed at the effect of preserving namerō, which is easily spoiled in the summer and cannot be stored in advance, and stimulating appetite decreased in the summer with acid. Depending on the family, this is eaten with soy sauce or another dipping sauce.
- In Shimanoura, a remote island off the coast of Nobeoka, Miyazaki Prefecture, there is a dish called tatakko (たたっこ), which is similar to namerō, and the grilled dish corresponding to sanga in the Boso Peninsula is also called 'tatakko'.
