= Alaea salt =

Unrefined sea salt mixed with a red ʻalaea volcanic clay

ʻAlaea salt
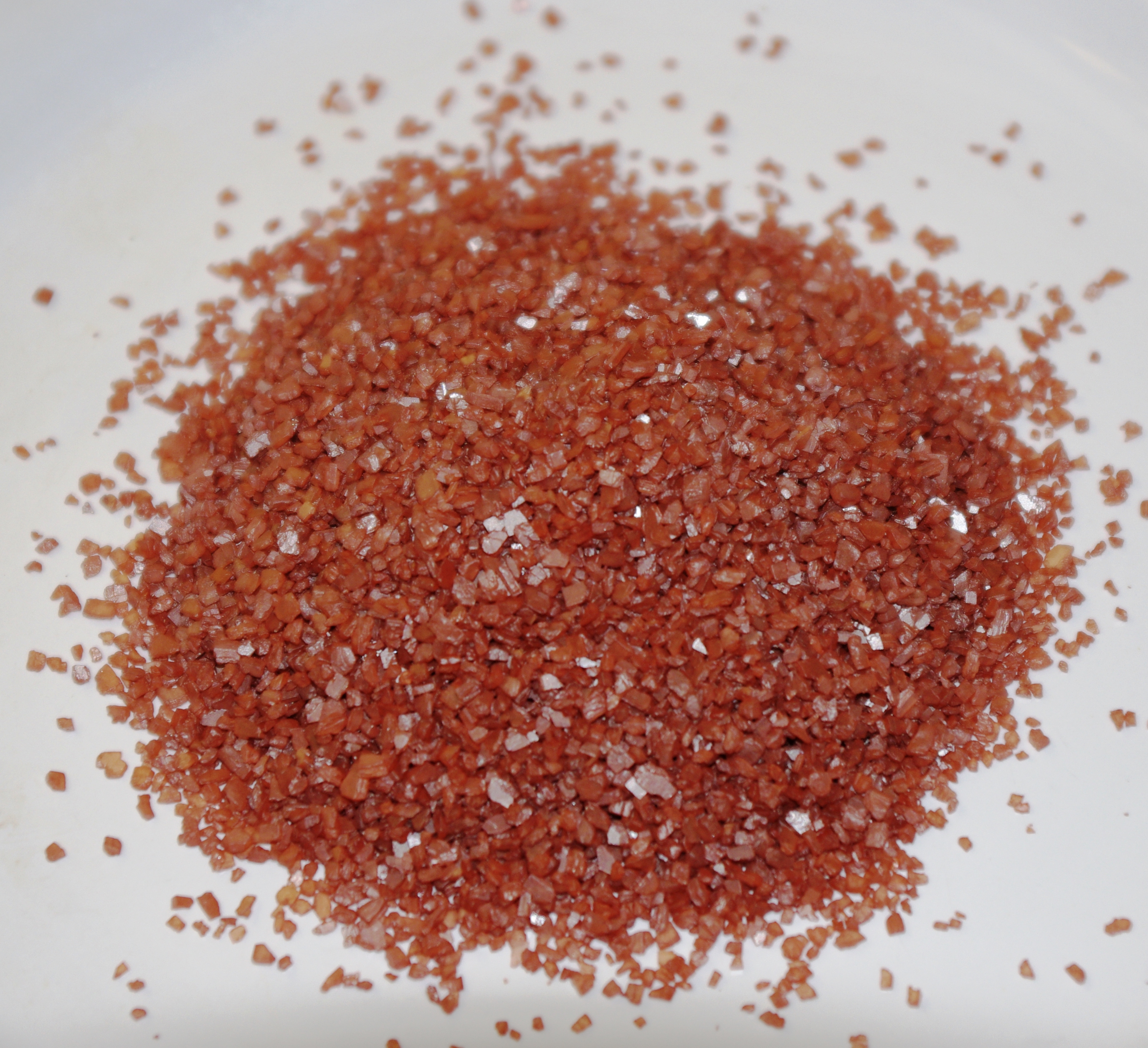
- Alaea salt is an unrefined sea salt that gets its brick red color from a Hawaiian volcanic clay called ʻalaea, composed of over 80 minerals and rich in iron oxide
- Alternative names: Hawaiian red salt
- Type: Sea salt
- Place of origin: United States
- Region or state: Hawaii
- Main ingredients: Salt
- Ingredients generally used: Red ʻalaea volcanic clay

Alaea salt, alternatively referred to as Hawaiian red salt, is an unrefined sea salt that has been mixed with an iron-oxide-rich volcanic clay called ʻalaea, which gives the seasoning its characteristic brick-red color. It is part of Native Hawaiian cuisine and is used in traditional dishes such as kalua pig, poke, and pipikaula (Hawaiian jerky). It was also traditionally used to cleanse, purify, and bless tools, canoes, homes, and temples. Once exported to the Pacific Northwest to cure salmon, it saw a resurgence in popularity late in the 20th century in fusion-style cuisine both on the Islands and beyond.

== History ==
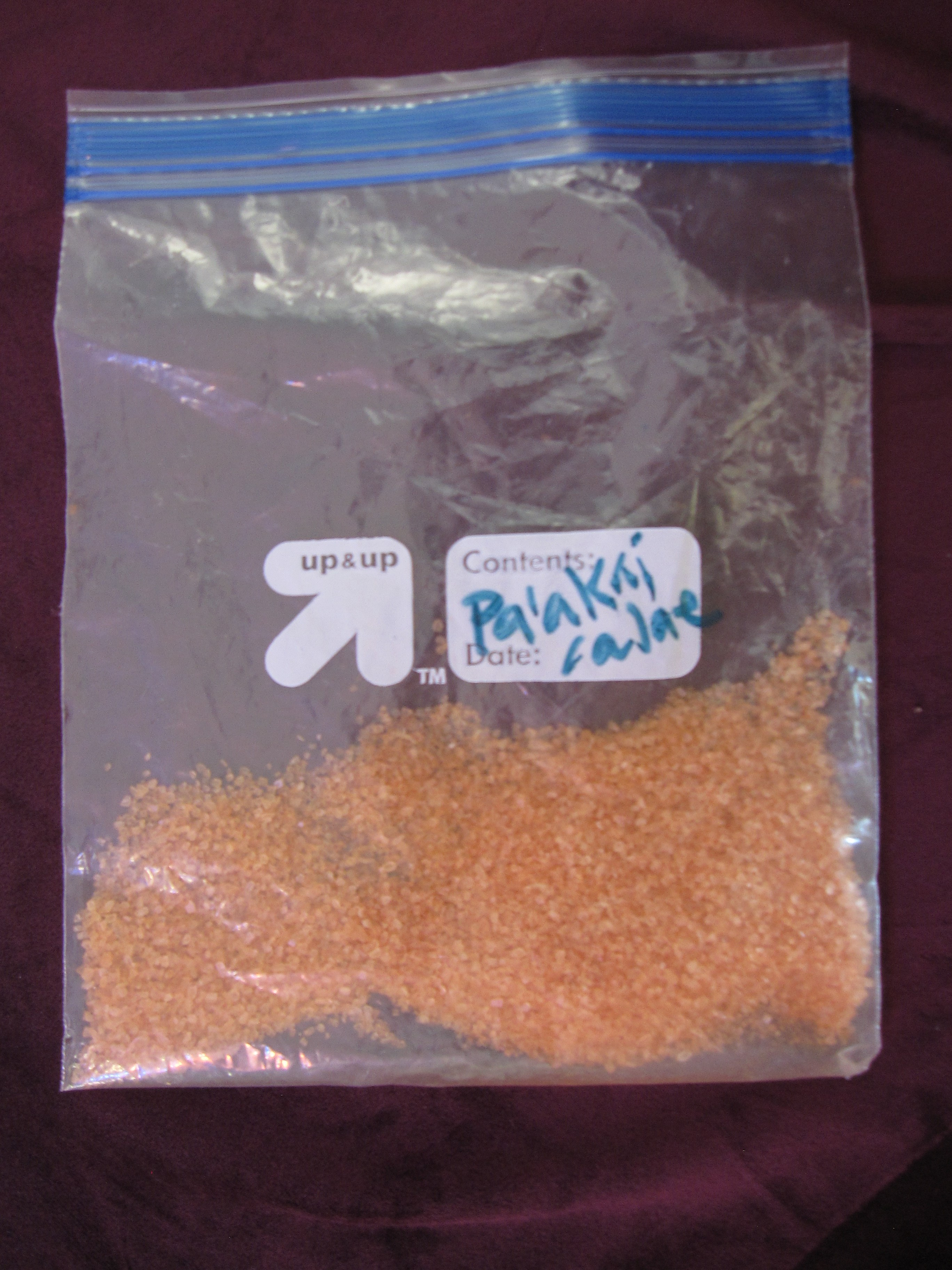
A bag of freshly extracted salt (paʻakai)

Hawaiians independently developed ways of extracting dry salt (paʻakai, lit. "sea[water] solid") in special pans (loʻi paʻakai) compared to other Polynesians that condiment their food with miti made with direct seawater. These native salt industries flourished in Āliamanu (also named Āliapaʻakai or Salt Lake since industry establishment), and Kawaihae in Hawaiʻi as well as Hanapēpē in Kauaʻi; only those in Hanapēpē remain to this day.

ʻAlaea, a water-soluble colloidal ocherous earth, was used for coloring salt, which in turn was traditionally used by Hawaiians to cleanse, purify, and bless tools, canoes, homes, and temples. Alaea salt is also used in several native Hawaiian dishes, including kalua pig, poke, and pipikaula (Hawaiian jerky). In the 19th century, Hawaiians began producing large amounts of alaea salt using European salt-making techniques and became a leading supplier to fishermen in the Pacific Northwest for curing salmon.

One author has claimed that most alaea salt sold in the United States is produced in California, not in Hawaii. True Hawaiian-made alaea salt is expensive and, before the rise of convenient Internet shopping, was difficult to find elsewhere.

== Colour ==
Alaea salt gets its characteristic brick-red color from a volcanic Hawaiian clay called ʻalaea, which contains some 80 minerals and is rich in iron oxide.
