= Inamona =

Condiment or relish used in traditional Hawaiian cooking

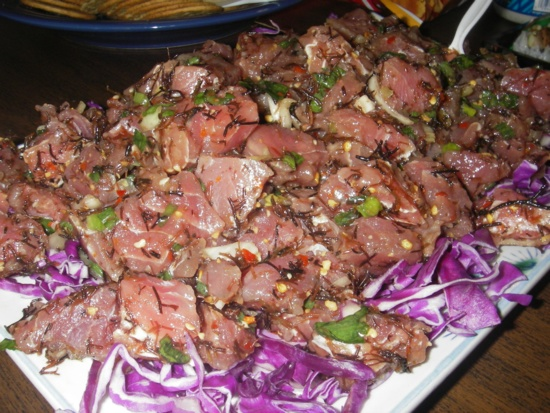
Limu poke at a retirement party buffet in Puunene, Maui in 2005. It was made with fresh ahi (yellowfin tuna), ʻinamona (chopped kukui nuts), green onions, and limu manauea. It is presented on a bed of red cabbage

ʻInamona is a condiment or relish used in traditional Hawaiian cooking made from seed kernels of the kukui nut (candlenuts) and sea salt.

To make traditional ʻinamona, the fruits of the kukui are harvested, dried, and husked. The exposed dried nuts are roasted over hot coals until evenly blackish brown. They are then cooled, sometimes dipped in cold water to crack the secondary husk and expose the kernel. First ground with a stone and mortar, the crushed kernels are then mixed with alaea salt to prevent rancidity.

In modern recipes, macadamia nuts are a substitute if candlenuts are not available. It is sometimes mixed with seaweeds, often accompanying meals or served with fresh fish.

== Uses ==
ʻInamona is used in poke and sometimes sushi. It enhances the flavor of the poke, which may be served "Hawaiian style" with a mix of sesame oil, limu, salt, and yellowfin tuna (ahi) or sometimes skipjack tuna (aku).
