= Francisco de Paula Marín =

Confidant of Hawaiian King Kamehameha I (1774–1837)

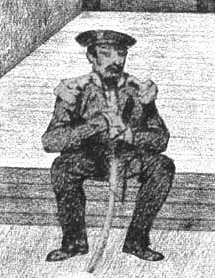
- Born: Francisco de Paula Marín y Grassi; 25 November 1774; Jerez de la Frontera, Spain
- Died: 30 October 1837 (aged 62); Honolulu, Hawaii
- Other names: Marini, Manini
- Known for: Horticulture
- Spouse: At least three
- Children: Many
- Parent(s): Juan Marín; María Grassi

Don Francisco de Paula Marín (25 November 1774 – 30 October 1837) was a Spaniard who became influential in the early Kingdom of Hawaii. Often called Manini, Marini or other variations, he became a confidant of Hawaiian King Kamehameha I. Marín acted as a jack-of-all-trades, sometimes even acting as a physician, probably without any formal education, and is credited with introducing many agricultural products.

== Life ==
Marín probably was born 25 November 1774 in Jerez de la Frontera in Spain. His father was Juan Marín and mother was María Grassi. It was likely he was an apprentice pilot on a ship associated with the Malaspina Expedition to Nootka Sound and Vancouver Island. At some point he deserted the Spanish and came aboard the American brig Lady Washington, captain John Kendrick.

He arrived in the Hawaiian Islands in 1793 or 1794. He became an interpreter and advisor in the acquisition and use of Western military weapons to King Kamehameha I who was just capturing Oʻahu island in the Battle of Nuʻuanu. For his service Marín was given land in present-day Honolulu near Pearl Harbor. He took at least one more trip off the islands. In 1804 he went as a pilot with captain James Rowan of the Hazard where he interpreted for Rowan with the Native Americans of the Pacific Northwest.

== Diplomacy and horticulture ==
Despite deserting them, Marín kept on good terms with the Spanish in Alta California. A natural charmer, he also had good relations with pirates such as Hippolyte de Bouchard on his visit in 1818, and with the French navigator Louis de Freycinet in 1819. He often asked for and received seeds, plants and animals, and then experimented with planting new kinds of fruits and vegetables in the Hawaiian Islands. He established Hawaii's first grape vineyard in 1815, and produced its first wine and brandy. He distilled sugarcane into rum, and experimented with beer. In 1813, Marin cultivated the Hawaiian Islands' first pineapple crop, and is usually credited with the first cotton, mango, and orange cultivation. He raised some of the first horses and cattle. Although some of these products might have been grown in household gardens, he ran the first Western-style commercial farming operation. His home became a boarding house, as he rented rooms and served meals to visiting merchants.

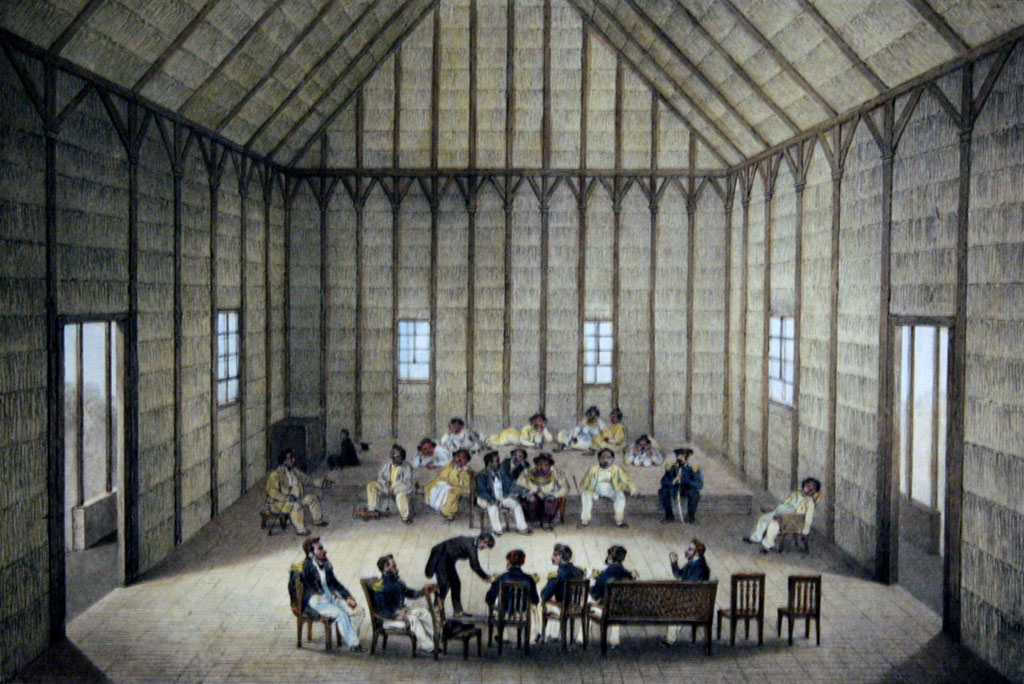
Marín at Hale Kauila with the royal court receiving the French Captain Du Petit Thouars, 1837

As the speaker of several languages, he was the unofficial diplomatic corps of Honolulu, acting as accountant and tax collector as he sold his products to restock ships. In April 1819 he was sent to attend the ailing Kamehameha as de facto royal physician and stayed with the king until he died on 8 May. The new King, Kamehameha II, and his young French drinking companion Jean Baptiste Rives were happy to offer Marín's refreshments to visitors. On 10 December 1819, Kamehameha II officially commissioned Marín as a captain in the Hawaiian Army.

== Family ==
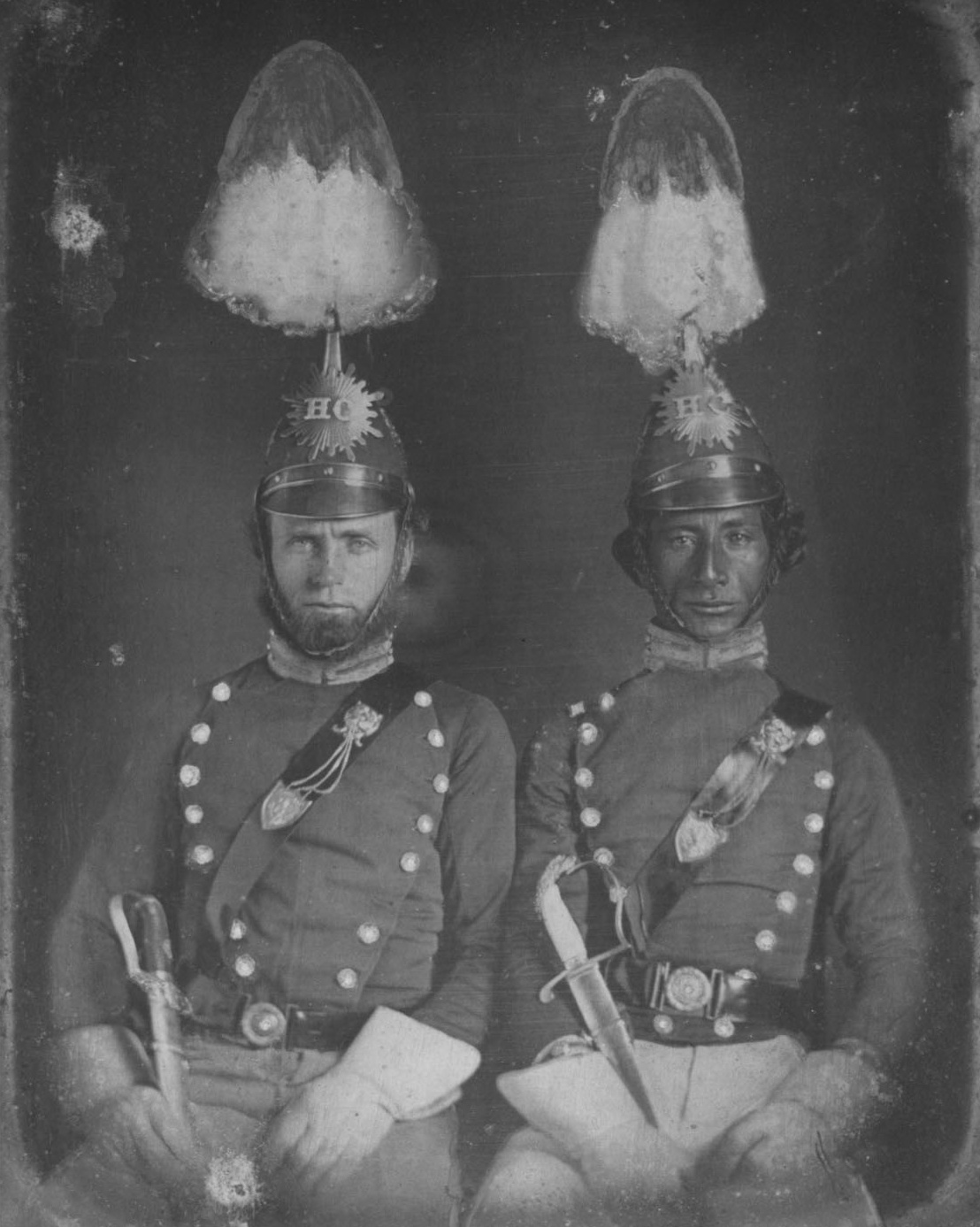
His son Paul Marin (right) photographed with Henry A. Neilson in the uniform of the Hawaiian Cavalry, 1855

Marín was also known for his family of at least three native Hawaiian wives and many children. His exact number of offspring is clouded by his penchant for exaggeration.

One daughter married Portuguese stonemason Antonio Ferreira, who in 1810 built one of the first stone houses in Honolulu for the Marín family. Daughter Cruz Marín married English sea captain Joseph Maughan. Daughter Lahilahi had children with American Consul John Coffin Jones (even though Jones was already married). Sons Nicolas and Paul F. Marin developed some early commercial facilities of the waterfront. His youngest daughter Antoinette Francesa Manini (1832–1905) married businessman Lyman Swan in 1851. Although Swan was accused of fraud in Hawaii, the family moved to Santa Cruz, California and became stable members of the early community there. Marín wrote to governor Luis Antonio Argüello about moving to Alta California himself, but was told his multiple wives would not be welcome.

== Religion ==
Despite his polygamy, Marín favored the Roman Catholic Church. When the first priests arrived, his growing family made a substantial part of the congregation. He acted as interpreter when the first Christian missionaries arrived in 1820. When Richard Charlton, the first official British trade representative, arrived he brought a letter addressed to Marín saying that land should be provided for the consulate. When Charlton pressed his claim, he produced a lease witnessed by Marín.

When HMS Blonde arrived in 1825 with the bodies of Kamehameha II and his queen, who died in London, more plants were left off with Marín, including some of the first coffee trees. Although the English gardener John Wilkinson sent on the Blonde soon died, many of the plants thrived on Marín's farm. Over the next few years, the puritanical views of Protestant missionaries such as Hiram Bingham I began to lessen Marín's influence. Alcoholic beverages were put under strict regulation, and Catholic priests were banished.

== Legacy ==
Marín died in Honolulu on 30 October 1837. After Robert Crichton Wyllie found Marín's diary as he started the Hawaii archives, he said:

...much of the present wealth of the islands, is owing to the seeds, roots, and plants introduced by that one man. In my own opinion, it may be fairly questioned if there existed on these islands, or exists at present, any man, to whom the Hawaiian people are generally so much indebted.

Marin street near the Honolulu Harbor was named for him 21°18′38″N 157°51′49″W. A 28-story high-rise apartment house called Marin Tower was built in 1994 on the site of his house, marked by a plaque and a sculpture titled Site of Passage by Laura Ruby. Vineyard street and boulevard at 21°18′41″N 157°51′19″W is also named for his vineyard.
