= Pipikaula =

Hawaiian dish of salted and dried beef similar to beef jerky

Pipikaula ("beef rope") is a Hawaiian cuisine dish of salted and dried beef similar to beef jerky. Pipikaula was eaten by Hawaiian cowboys (paniolos). It was usually broiled before serving.

== History ==
Kamehameha I was given cattle by George Vancouver as a gift during the latter's visit in 1793. Kamehameha had declared a kapu on the herd as to allow them to reproduce, the offspring grew much more than expected; thus, he hired foreign cowhands to manage them. In the 19th century John Parker brought Mexican cowboys to train the Hawaiians in cattle ranching. The Hawaiian cowboys of Kamuela and Kula came to be called paniolos. Cattle ranching grew rapidly for the next one hundred years. In 1960, half of the land in Hawaii was devoted to ranching for beef export, but by 1990 the number had shrunk to 25 percent. The paniolos chewed pipikaula.

With the influence of Asian cooking, beef strips are commonly marinated in soy sauce. When beef is dried in the sun, a screened box is traditionally used to keep the meat from dust and flies. Dried meat could often be found as a relish or appetizer at a lū‘au.
