= List of Hawaiian dishes =

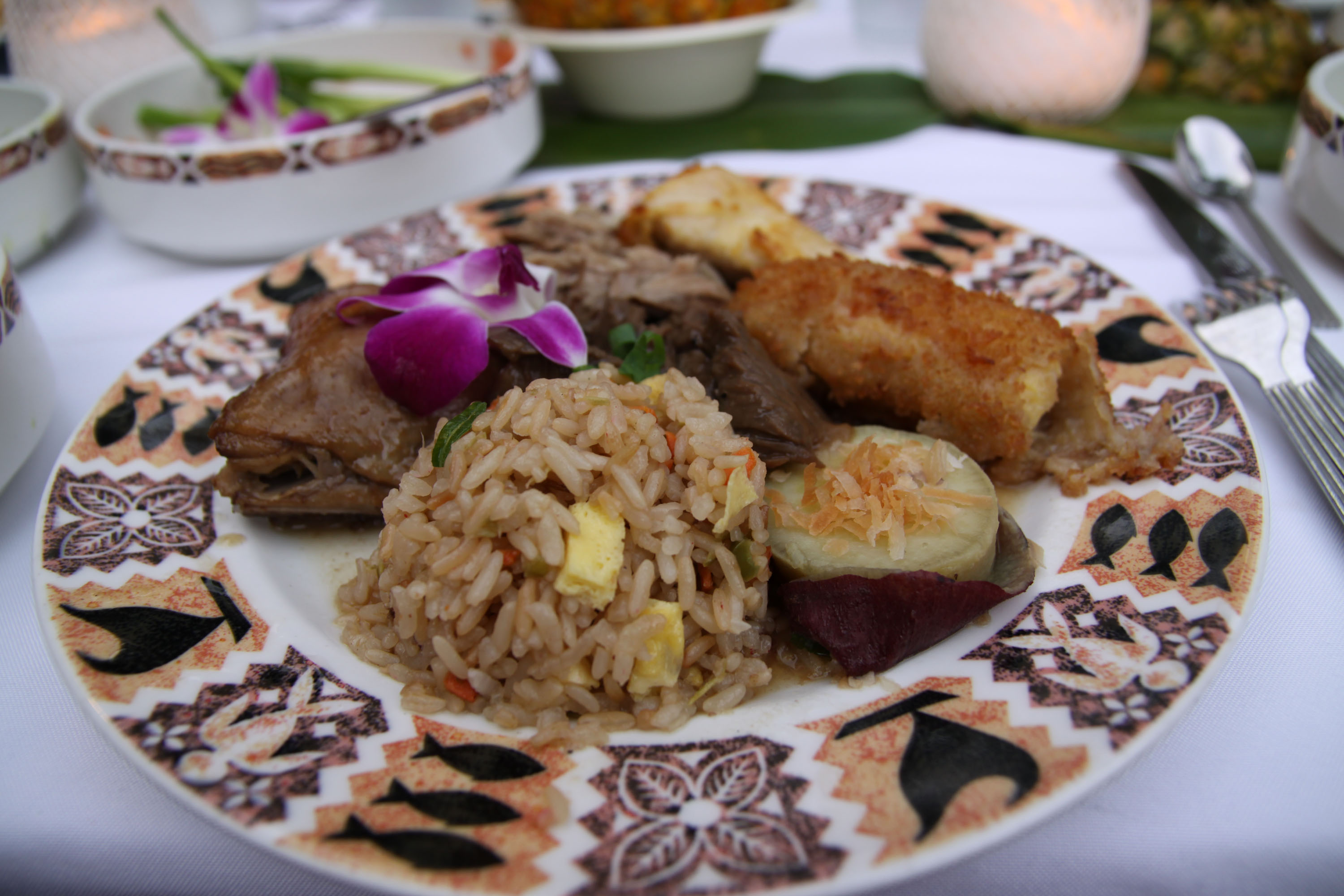
A plate of Hawaiian food

This is a list of dishes in Hawaiian cuisine, which includes Native Hawaiian cuisine and broader fusion cuisines within the state of Hawaii.

== List of Hawaiian dishes ==
Name	Image	Origin	Description
Plate lunch		Polynesian, North American, East Asian	Called pā mea ʻai in ʻōlelo Hawaiʻi, it is a standard plate lunches consist of one or two scoops of white rice, macaroni salad and an entrée like chicken katsu or teriyaki.
Mixed plate		Hawaiʻi	A plate lunch with two types of protein.
Okazuya		Japan	Served as a main meal or side dish.
Loco moco		Hawaiʻi	Served as a main meal.
Spam musubi		Japan	Onigiri with meat such as SPAM, hot dog, or Göteborg musubi on the island of Kauai; served as a snack or a main meal.
Portuguese sausage		Portugal	A common breakfast main meal, sometimes with SPAM, eggs and rice. It is a featured item at places like fast food restaurants like McDonald's and Burger King.
Poi		Hawaiʻi (Native Hawaiian)	A traditional staple starch paste made from fermented mashed cooked taro corms.
Poke		Hawaiʻi (Native Hawaiian)	Served as an appetizer or a main meal.
Lomi-lomi salmon		Hawaiʻi (Native Hawaiian)	A fresh side salad made with salted salmon, tomatoes, and sweet onions, introduced by early Western sailors.
Kālua pig		Hawaiʻi (Native Hawaiian)	Traditionally made with a whole pig, covered with banana leaves, and cooked in an imu (underground oven) for several hours until tender.
Haupia		Hawaiʻi (Native Hawaiian), Polynesia	A traditional gelatinous coconut milk dessert made with pia (Polynesian arrowroot), a root vegetable introduced by early Polynesian voyagers used as a traditional thickening agent for haupia. It is served either standalone or as an accompaniment to other sweets.
Onigiri		Japan	Rice balls seasoned with salt, sometimes sprinkled with furikake, wrapped with nori, or stuffed with an umeboshi
Cone sushi		Japan	inari sushi using larger abura-age pockets
Futomaki		Japan	Or "maki roll," a rolled sushi containing cucumber, parcooked carrots, tamagoyaki, kampyo, and hana ebi (powdered dried shrimp)
Chow fun		China	Flat wheat noodles stir-fried with vegetables
Fried saimin		Hawaiʻi	Stir-fried saimin noodles similar to yakisoba
Chicken long rice		China	Chicken served with starch noodles simmered with soy sauce
Kinpira gobo		Japan	Braised burdock in sweetened soy sauce
Namasu		Japan	Pickled vegetables, typically thinly sliced cucumbers, carrots, and daikon
Shira ae		Japan	Salad of mashed tofu and vegetables
Okara (unohana)		Japan	Simmered soybean pulp with vegetables
Kabocha		Japan	Braised Japanese pumpkin nimono in sweetened soy sauce
Potato salad		European	Potatoes mixed with vegetables in mayonnaise
Macaroni salad		European	Macaroni, or other pasta, mixed with mayonnaise, sometimes with canned tuna
Tempura	Tempura 01 (cropped)	Japan	Deep-fried battered shrimp, fish, or vegetables
Fried chicken		Japan, United States	Deep-fried chicken thighs karaage style or in mochiko batter
Fish cake		Japan	Deep-fried fish croquettes made from surimi, sometimes stuffed with hard-boiled egg or hot dog
Korokke		Japan	Or "hash balls," deep-fried potato croquettes in batter or panko
Nishime		Japan	Simmered mixed vegetables, sometimes with chicken or pork
Shoyu pork, chicken		Okinawa	Pork, chicken, or hot dog simmered in soy sauce and sugar
Potato hash patty		European	Potato croquettes sometimes seasoned with corned beef
Tamagoyaki		Japan	Egg omelette sometimes mixed with vegetables or meats
Teriyaki		Japan	Thinly sliced beef, boneless chicken thighs, meatballs or hamburger steak grilled and glazed with teriyaki sauce
Tofu patty		Japan, Hawaiʻi	A fish cake made with mashed tofu and canned tuna or salmon
Potato mac salad		Euro-American, Hawaiʻi	A local variation of potato salad combined with macaroni pasta and mayonnaise, commonly served as a component of a plate lunch.
Dobash cake		Hawaiʻi	
Haupia cake		Hawaiʻi	
Lilikoi butter		Hawaiʻi	
Lilikoi bar		Hawaiʻi	
Lilikoi cake		Hawaiʻi	
Guava cake		Hawaiʻi	
Rainbow cake		Hawaiʻi	A chiffon cake, once a perennial favorite at birthday parties for over 40 years.
Chantilly cake		Hawaiʻi	haupia, and guava/rainbow chiffon, once a perennial favorite at birthday parties for over 40 years.
Guri-guri		Hawaiʻi (Maui), Japan	A sherbet originating from Maui via Japan.
Hawaiian shave ice		Hawaiʻi, Japan, Korea, Taiwan	Thinly shaved ice and syrup served in a cup, paper cone, or bowl. Syrups used for Hawaiian shave ice include banana, pineapple, lychee, kiwifruit, mango, passionfruit, guava, and coconut. Also known as "ice shave" in other parts of the state.
Kōʻelepālau		Hawaiʻi (Native Hawaiian)	Pudding of mashed sweet potato mixed with coconut milk.
Kūlolo		Hawaiʻi (Native Hawaiian)	A distant Austronesian relative of the dodol using taro and coconut milk.
Piele		Hawaiʻi (Native Hawaiian)	A kūlolo-like dessert made with sweet potato or breadfruit.
Lilikoi bar		Euro-American, Hawaiʻi	A local variation of the lemon bar.
Mochi		Japan	Includes butter mochi, which is a favorite omiyage.
Pies		Euro-American, Hawaiʻi	Varieties include custard, pumpkin, pumpkin-custard, haupia, chocolate haupia, and Okinawan sweet potato haupia.
Pumpkin crunch		Euro-American, Hawaiʻi	A variation on the "pumpkin (pie) dump cake" popularized by Sam Choy, often served chilled as a dessert bar.
Andagi		Japan (Okinawa)	Popular at pop-up shops during festivals like Obon.
Anpan		Japan	A sweet roll typically filled with red bean paste.
Apple turnover		Euro-American, Hawaiʻi	Made popular by Zippy's under the name "Apple Napples".
Banana bread		Euro-American	A moist sweet bread made from mashed bananas, common throughout the islands.
Blondies		Euro-American, Hawaiʻi	Made popular by Kamehameha Schools and locally referred to as "haole brownies".
Bok tong go		China	Generically known as "(Chinese steamed) rice cake," it is a classic item sold by the manapua man. A multiple-layered version similar to kue lapis featuring a brown sugar top layer also exists.
Chinese almond biscuit		China	Simply known locally as an "almond cookie".
Chinese shortbread		China	Also known as "kong sui ban," this is a very tender Chinese biscuit with a texture between a cookie and a cake, often paired with hot tea.
Chinese-style bakery buns		China, Hawaiʻi	Savoury baked buns such as hot dog or ham and cheese buns.
Macadamia nut cookies		Euro-American, Hawaiʻi	Chocolate chip cookies and shortbread baked with the addition of local macadamia nuts.
Coco puffs		Euro-American, Hawaiʻi	A popular cream puff variant made by Liliha Bakery, typically filled with a chocolate pudding and topped with chantilly frosting.
Jindui		China	A fried pastry pastry that serves as a staple during Chinese New Year but is eaten throughout the year.
Lavash		Armenian, Hawaiʻi	Also spelled "lavosh", this crisp flatbread was glamourized in the 1960s as a high-end alternative to toast. The version sold at the Kanemitsu Bakery counter in Molokaʻi offers flavors including Maui onion, sesame, taro, and cinnamon.
Malasada		Portugal	A fried staple on Mardi Gras that remains popular throughout the year. Modern local recipes involve coating it with cinnamon sugar or filling it with various jams and creams like guava, haupia, or custard.
Manapua		China	A local iteration of the Cantonese char siu bao that is often two to three times larger than the versions found in standard dim sum restaurants. Popular fillings include a whole lup cheong sausage, sweet potato, or kalua pig, and it is sometimes baked rather than steamed, a style made popular by the Royal Kitchen in Chinatown during the 1970s.
Manju		Japan	A baked sweet dumpling that has become a favorite omiyage for travelers leaving Maui.
Molokai "hot bread"		Hawaiʻi	A well-known bakery export of Molokai featured by Anthony Bourdain. The bakery was a semifinalist for the James Beard Foundation Award for Outstanding Baker.
Moon cakes		China	A seasonal favorite during the Chinese Mid-Autumn Festival where local island flavors like mango and taro are sometimes incorporated.
Nian gao		China	Locally known simply as "gau," this is a sticky sweet staple of Chinese New Year sold at many local shops or made in bulk by households to share with families.
Poi pastries		Hawaiʻi, Portugal, Japan	Modern specialty pastries incorporating poi into the dough, including poi donuts, poi malasadas, and poi mochi.
Portuguese sweet bread		Portugal	A soft, sweet yeast bread known as "Hawaiian sweet rolls" outside of the state.
Spanish rolls		Philippines	A sweet, soft pastry roll rolled with a sugar and butter filling, popular as an office snack to pair with coffee.
Snow puffies		Hawaiʻi	A local flaky pastry variation of the Napoleon puff pastry layer cake.
Adobo		Philippines	A savory dish of pork simmered in vinegar, soy sauce, garlic, and spices.
Cantonese-influenced dim sum		China	Includes local adaptations such as char siu manapua; fun guo, locally called pepeiao (meaning "ear" in Hawaiian); gok jai ("half moon"); pork hash which is typically twice the size of a standard shumai; and ma tai su, a baked pork and water chestnut pastry.
Crispy gau gee		China, Hawaiʻi	Deep-fried dumplings (also spelled kau gee) constructed by folding a square wrapper in half into simple rectangular or triangular pockets.
Kalua pig		Hawaiʻi (Native Hawaiian)	Pork slow-roasted inside an underground oven (imu) until exceptionally tender and smoky.
Laulau		Hawaiʻi (Native Hawaiian)	A traditional preparation consisting of pork wrapped securely in taro leaves and steamed inside a ti leaf bundle.
Lechon		Philippines	A spit-roasted whole pig style introduced by Filipino immigrants, featuring extremely crispy skin.
Portuguese sausage		Portugal	A smoked pork sausage seasoned with garlic and paprika, common as a local breakfast staple.
Lumpia		Philippines	Fried spring rolls filled with minced pork and chopped vegetables.
Lūʻau stew		Hawaiʻi (Native Hawaiian), Hawaiʻi	A local comfort food dish prepared by simmering taro leaves with pork until smooth and tender.
Pasteles		Puerto Rico	A savory meat pie variant introduced by Puerto Rican laborers, featuring seasoned pork encased in a green plantain or root vegetable masa, wrapped in banana leaves and boiled.
Pastele stew		Puerto Rico, Hawaiʻi	A local fusion stew featuring the seasoned pork, olives, and sofrito flavors of pasteles cooked without the labor-intensive leaf wrapping.
Pork guisantes		Philippines	A Filipino-style savory pork stew simmered with green peas and tomato sauce.
Rafute		Japan (Okinawa)	A dish of glazed, skin-on pork belly chunks slowly simmered in soy sauce, brown sugar, and Okinawan alcohol.
Siu mei		China	Cantonese-style roasted meats including sweet barbecued pork (char siu) and crisp-skinned roasted pork belly (siu yuk).
Won ton		China	Boiled or fried Chinese dumplings containing a minced pork filling.
Vinha d'alhos		Portugal	A traditional garlic and wine-marinated pork dish served on festive occasions.
Cake noodles		China, Hawaiʻi	A crisp cake formed by pan-frying chow mein noodles until the crust is crunchy while the interior stays tender, cut into blocks and ladled with a saucy topping like beef and broccoli.
Chow mein		China	Stir-fried wheat noodles tossed with sliced vegetables and protein.
Look fun		China	Wide, flat steamed rice noodles often seasoned with soy sauce or served in broth.
Pancit		Philippines	Stir-fried noodles prepared with vegetables and meat fragments, introduced by Filipino immigrants.
Saimin		Hawaiʻi	A definitive local noodle soup developed during the plantation era, featuring soft wheat egg noodles in a clear hot dashi broth. It can also be served stir-fried as fried saimin.
Yakisoba		Japan	Stir-fried wheat noodles seasoned with a savory, sweet sauce.
Steamed rice		Asia	Standard medium-grain white rice cooked soft, serving as the baseline carbohydrate for most local meals.
Fried rice		China, Hawaiʻi	Wok-fried rice tossed with egg, green onions, and local diced proteins like Spam, Portuguese sausage, or char siu.
Mochi rice		Japan	Glutinous short-grain rice cooked until sticky, used in both savory and sweet dishes.
Musubi		Japan	Hand-pressed rice blocks, often wrapped with a ribbon of dried seaweed.
Futomaki		Japan	Locally called maki, this thick rolled sushi contains standard fillings such as sweet egg omelette (tamagoyaki), pickled gourd (kampyo), cucumber, carrots, and sweet pink dried shrimp powder (hana ebi).
Inarizushi		Japan	Locally called inari or "cone sushi," consisting of sweet seasoned fried tofu pockets stuffed with vinegared sushi rice.
Arare and senbei		Japan	Small, savory Japanese rice crackers seasoned with soy sauce. Arare is interchangeably known locally as kakimochi.
Coconut balls		Hawaiʻi	Sweet confectionary treats rolled in shredded coconut.
Crack seed		China	A category of preserved, dried, or wet fruits such as plums, lemons, and mangoes featuring intensely sweet, sour, and salty profiles.
Dried squid or cuttlefish		Asia	Chewy, seasoned strips of dried seafood consumed as a popular savory snack.
Haw flakes		China	Thin, disc-shaped sweet wafers made from the fruit of the Chinese hawthorn.
Hurricane popcorn		Hawaiʻi	A modern snack mix consisting of buttered popcorn tossed with crunchy arare rice crackers and savory furikake seasoning.
Li hing mui candies		China, Hawaiʻi	Various sweets, including gummy candies and dried fruits, dusted with a sour, salty, and sweet powdered plum seasoning.
Macadamia nuts		Australia, Hawaiʻi	Rich, buttery roasted nuts that became a signature agricultural product of the islands, frequently sold dipped in milk or dark chocolate.
Maui-style potato chips		Hawaiʻi (Maui)	Thick-cut, extra-crunchy kettle style potato chips manufactured on the island of Maui.
Sesame seed candy		China	A crunchy confection made from toasted sesame seeds bound together with hardened sugar syrup.
Shortbread		Scotland, Hawaiʻi	Rich, buttery cookies often adapted locally with island additions like chopped macadamia nuts.
Shrimp chip		Asia	Light, airy fried crisps flavored with prawn or shrimp essence.
Taegu		Korea, Hawaiʻi	A seasoned side dish or snack made from shredded dried squid, cuttlefish, or codfish tossed in a sweet and fiery gochujang paste sauce.
One-Ton chips		China, Hawaiʻi	Crisp, fried strips of wonton dough produced as a commercial snack cracker by the Maebo Noodle Factory.
Oxtail soup		China, Hawaiʻi	A rich, clear broth containing tender, slow-simmered oxtail segments, heavily garnished with fresh ginger and cilantro.
Saimin		Hawaiʻi	The classic local plantation-era wheat noodle soup served hot in an aromatic dashi broth. It is often garnished with green onions, char siu, and fish cake (kamaboko), or augmented with wontons to create wonton saimin.
Portuguese bean soup		Portugal, Hawaiʻi	Locally known as sopa de feijao, this hearty soup features red kidney beans simmered with Portuguese sausage, cabbage, macaroni, and vegetables.
Ashitibichi		Japan (Okinawa)	A traditional Okinawan pig's feet soup simmered until the meat is completely tender, often featuring mustard greens or daikon.
Wonton mein		China	A Chinese-style hot noodle soup containing
Chili frank		United States, Hawaiʻi	Thick chili cooked with whole hot dogs and traditionally served over white rice.
Beef stew		Euro-American, Hawaiʻi	A local comfort food variant of classic slow-simmered beef stew, typically sweeter and served over white rice.
Bulgogi		Korea	Thinly sliced beef marinated in a sweet soy, sesame, and garlic sauce, then grilled.
Canned corned beef		Euro-American, Hawaiʻi	Corned beef heated through and commonly pan-fried with onions, served as a breakfast or local plate lunch staple.
Corned beef hash		Euro-American, Hawaiʻi	Finely chopped corned beef mixed with potatoes, normally shaped into uniform patties and pan-fried until crisp.
Hamburger curry stew		Japan, Hawaiʻi	Ground beef patties or seasoned meat simmered in a thick, mild Japanese-style curry gravy.
Shoyu dogs		Japan, Hawaiʻi	Hot dogs that are simply boiled, pan-fried, grilled, or simmered in a sweetened soy sauce glaze and served alongside rice.
Kalbi shortribs		Korea	Flanken-cut beef short ribs marinated in a sweet soy-sesame mixture and charred on a grill.
Loco moco		Hawaiʻi	A definitive local contemporary dish featuring white rice topped with a hamburger patty, a fried egg, and thick brown gravy.
Meat jun		Korea, Hawaiʻi	A local Hawaiian-Korean variation of jeon consisting of thin slices of beef, often marinated, dipped in flour and egg batter, and pan-fried.
Pho		Vietnam	A fragrant Vietnamese noodle soup utilizing a clear beef broth, rice noodles, herbs, and thinly sliced meat pieces.
Pipikaula		Hawaiʻi (Native Hawaiian)	Meaning "beef rope", this dish consists of salted and dried beef chunks that resemble beef jerky, often pan-fried before serving.
Sukiyaki		Japan	A one-pot sweet and savory hot pot meal containing thinly sliced beef, tofu, and assorted vegetables simmered in a soy sauce broth.
Teriyaki beef		Japan, Hawaiʻi	Thinly sliced beef marinated and glazed in a sweet teriyaki sauce, then grilled or pan-fried.
Teriyaki burgers		United States, Hawaiʻi	A common item at local burger establishments featuring hamburger patties glazed in teriyaki sauce; the "McTeri Deluxe" is offered as a seasonal favorite at local McDonald's outlets.
Teriyaki meatballs		Japan, Hawaiʻi	Seasoned ground beef spheres cooked and glazed in a sweet, sticky teriyaki sauce.
Siu mei chicken dishes		China	Cantonese-style roasted and seasoned poultry items, including cold ginger chicken and roasted duck.
Minute Chicken		China, Hawaiʻi	A local Chinese-restaurant favorite featuring sliced chicken stir-fried quickly with vegetables in a thick, savory gravy over crisp or soft noodles.
Fried chicken variations		Japan, Korea, United States	Assorted local deep-fried styles including breaded chicken katsu, ginger-soy seasoned karaage, glazed Korean fried chicken, sweet garlic chicken, and sweet-rice-flour battered mochiko chicken.
Grilled chicken variations		Japan, Korea, Hawaiʻi	Barbecued poultry options featuring sweet teriyaki glazed chicken, Korean-style sesame-soy barbecue chicken, and sweet, rotisserie-turned huli-huli chicken.
Chicken stews		China, Japan, Philippines, Hawaiʻi	Savory pot meals encompassing vinegar-garlic chicken adobo, taro-leaf based chicken luau stew, Cantonese soy sauce chicken, Japanese-style shoyu chicken, ginger-papaya tinola stew, chicken long rice, and vegetable-heavy nishime.
Side dish pickles		Korea, Japan	Small pickled side dishes including Korean Banchan and Japanese tsukemono.
Sweet bean paste		China, Japan	Confectionary pastes such as Japanese sweetened red bean anko used in manjū, or Chinese "black sugar" bean fillings used for frying jindui.
Champuru		Japan (Okinawa)	A stir-fried scramble dish featuring tofu, vegetables, and optional meats, introduced by Okinawan immigrants.
Chop suey		China, Hawaiʻi	A local Chinese-American style stir-fry of mixed vegetables and meats bound in a thickened savory sauce.
Congee variations		Asia	Thick rice gruel savory bowls spanning Cantonese jook, ginger-chicken garlic Filipino arroz caldo, Korean juk, and Vietnamese chao.
Jai		China	A complex, savory vegetarian stew cooked with various roots and fungi, traditionally served during Chinese New Year festivities.
Miso		Japan	A thick, rich fermented soybean paste used across the islands to base local soups, marinades, and dressings.
Palusami		Samoa	A traditional Polynesian dish made of rich coconut cream wrapped tightly in tender taro leaves and baked.
Palula		Hawaiʻi (Native Hawaiian)	The tender green leaves of the sweet potato plant cooked standalone or simmered alongside taro leaves.
Local pickles		Asia, Hawaiʻi	Assorted localized pickled items including crunchy seasoned unripe mangoes, crisp local sweet onions, pickled seaweeds (limu or ogo), sweet-and-sour radishes for Vietnamese đồ chua, yellow crunchy Japanese takuwan or Korean danmuji, vinegared cucumber namasu, and various spiced cabbage kimchi.
Pinakbet		Philippines	A robust Filipino-style vegetable stew simmered with bitter melon, eggplant, long beans, and pork belly, seasoned with shrimp paste.
Sari-sari		Philippines, Hawaiʻi	A Filipino-inspired mixed vegetable soup made with whatever seasonal island greens and proteins are available.
Tofu		China, Japan	Coagulated soybean milk pressed into soft or firm white blocks, used widely across local soups, stir-fries, and plate lunches.
Watercress soup		China, Hawaiʻi	A comforting, clear broth soup featuring bunches of peppery fresh watercress simmered with pork ribs, highly common at traditional local eateries.
ʻUala hoʻomalamala		Hawaiʻi (Native Hawaiian)	A traditional staple paste constructed exactly like taro poi but utilizing steamed, mashed sweet potatoes.
Abalone		Asia, Hawaiʻi	Large, edible marine gastropod mollusks prized for their rich meat, either harvested wild or cultivated in local island aquaculture farms.
Bacalhau		Portugal	Traditional salt-cured, dried codfish introduced by Portuguese immigrant families.
Butterfish		Japan, Hawaiʻi	North Pacific sablefish, heavily favored for its rich, oily texture and frequently prepared miso-marinated or simmered in a sweet soy broth.
Kamaboko		Japan	Cured, surimi fish paste logs steamed on small wooden blocks, featuring a signature pink or white skin; a definitive noodle soup garnish.
Lomi oio		Hawaiʻi (Native Hawaiian)	A traditional preparation consisting of massaged, bone-scraped raw bonefish meat worked into a soft paste with sea salt, limu seaweed, and chili water.
ʻAhi		Hawaiʻi (Native Hawaiian), Japan	Local yellowfin or bigeye tuna, serving as the central choice for raw sashimi cuts and fresh poke cubes.
Mahi mahi		Hawaiʻi (Native Hawaiian)	Dolphinfish, a popular local open-ocean game fish prized for its firm, sweet white meat when grilled or fried.
Saba		Japan	Pacific mackerel, a rich, oily dark meat fish commonly prepared salted and grilled.
Salmon		Euro-American, Hawaiʻi	Coldwater fish introduced via historical Pacific trade routes, utilized raw in lomi salads or cooked in local plates.
Sakura-boshi		Japan, Hawaiʻi	A savory local fish jerky variant made by marinating strips of yellowfin tuna (ʻahi) in a sweet soy and sesame mixture before drying.
Sashimi		Japan	Fresh, premium raw seafood sliced into delicate strips and served alongside shoyu and wasabi.
Squid lu'au		Hawaiʻi (Native Hawaiian)	A classic island feast dish consisting of tender squid tentacles slow-simmered with young taro leaf greens and coconut milk.

== Seasonings and condiments ==
Name	Image	Influence	Description
Fermented bean products		China, Japan, Korea	A broad category of fermented pantry staples including salted black beans (douchi), spicy broad bean paste (doubanjiang), sweet-and-spicy red chili paste (gochujang), and savory soybean paste (miso).
Fina'denne'		Guam, Micronesia	A salty, tart, and sharp Chamorro condiment made from soy sauce, vinegar or citrus juice, chopped onions, and fresh hot chilis.
Fish sauce		Southeast Asia	An intense, salty condiment derived from fermented fish, encompassing regional variants like Filipino patis or Thai nam pla.
Fish paste		Philippines	A pungent, salted seafood condiment; local preparations frequently feature Filipino bagoong monamon.
Shrimp paste		China, Philippines	Strong, salted condiments made from crushed shrimp, featuring varieties like Filipino bagoong alamang or Cantonese haam ha.
Furikake		Japan	A dry Japanese seasoning mix designed to be sprinkled over rice, usually containing toasted sesame seeds, chopped seaweed (nori), salt, and sugar.
"Hawaiian" chili pepper		Hawaiʻi	Small, exceptionally pungent bird's-eye chilis (Capsicum frutescens) used whole or crushed to brew local spicy "chili pepper water".
Chili paste		Southeast Asia	Smooth or chunky hot pepper condiments featuring profiles similar to Indonesian sambal or Thai-American sriracha.
Chili powder		Japan, Korea	Ground hot pepper seasonings, ranging from coarse Korean red pepper flakes (gochugaru) to complex seven-spice Japanese blends (shichimi).
Chili oil		China, Japan	Infused oils featuring fiery chili sediments, encompassing texture-heavy chili crisp configurations and smooth Japanese layu.
Curry blocks		Japan	Concentrated curry powder, flour, and fat roux blocks used to cook thick, mild, and sweet Japanese-style stews.
Ginger scallion sauce		China, Hawaiʻi	Locally called geung yeung, this simple condiment combines finely minced ginger, green onions, oil, and salt. It is traditionally paired with cold ginger chicken, but is also adapted as a modern dressing option for fish poke.
Honey		Hawaiʻi	Sweet artisanal honey varieties harvested locally from honeybees foraging on island macadamia or native ohia lehua blossoms.
Hoisin		China	A thick, fragrant Cantonese barbecue sauce made from fermented soybeans, garlic, vinegar, chilies, and sugar.
ʻInamona		Hawaiʻi (Native Hawaiian)	A traditional relish made from roasted, crushed kukui nut (candlenut) kernels mixed with sea salt.
Kalbi marinade		Korea	A sweet and savory Korean sauce blend prepared with soy sauce, sugar, garlic, sesame oil, and Asian pear juice.
Kiawe charcoal		Hawaiʻi	Hardwood charcoal harvested from local kiawe (mesquite) trees, prized for imparting a robust smoky flavor to grilled meats.
Mayonnaise		Euro-American	A thick, creamy emulsion of oil, egg yolk, and acid, serving as the foundational binder for local potato and macaroni salads.
Mirin		Japan	A sweet, low-alcohol golden rice wine used to add glaze and subtle sweetness to sauces and braises.
Mandoo dipping sauce		Korea, Hawaiʻi	A tangy, savory dipping sauce prepared by combining soy sauce, vinegar, sesame oil, and optional chili or green onions, traditionally paired with dumplings and meat jun.
Chinese hot mustard		China, British	A sharp, nasal-clearing condiment prepared by hydrating dry powder, such as Colman's, with water or vinegar. It is frequently mixed with soy sauce or chili paste at the table for dipping Chinese dim sum or seafood sashimi.
Oyster sauce		China	A dark, viscous, and savory condiment cooked down from oyster extracts, sugar, and salt, used to finish local stir-fries.
Salt		Hawaiʻi (Native Hawaiian)	Locally known as paʻakai, the most famous regional variety is coarse alaea salt, which derives its distinct brick-red hue from natural volcanic clay minerals.
Sweet onions		Hawaiʻi (Maui)	Mild, crisp, and exceptionally sweet raw onions, most notably harvested from the slopes of Haleakalā on Maui.
Liliko'i butter		Euro-American, Hawaiʻi	A rich, velvety fruit spread cooked using local yellow passion fruit juice, eggs, butter, and sugar.
Ponzu		Japan	A bright, tart citrus-based sauce incorporating soy sauce, rice vinegar, mirin, katsuobushi dashi, and juice from fruits like yuzu.
Sesame oil		Asia	An aromatic vegetable oil pressed from toasted sesame seeds, used sparingly as a flavorful finish.
Soy sauce		China, Japan	Categorically known across the islands as shoyu, this dark, salty, fermented soybean liquid is the central seasoning element of local cuisine.
Tabasco sauce		United States	A popular commercial brand of hot sauce produced from aged tabasco peppers, vinegar, and salt.
Taegu sauce		Korea, Hawaiʻi	A sweet, savory, and spicy condiment blend created by mixing gochujang, gochugaru, soy sauce, and toasted sesame oil.
Tonkatsu sauce		Japan	A thick, dark, and fruity brown sauce manufactured from puréed vegetables, fruits, vinegar, and spices, served over deep-fried cutlets.
Tsuyu dipping sauce		Japan	A savory dashi broth infused with soy sauce, mirin, and sugar, served alongside hot or cold wheat and buckwheat noodles.
Wasabi		Japan	A pungent, hot green root paste, or commercial imitations derived from dyed horseradish, served alongside raw fish.
Umeboshi		Japan	Salt-pickled, intensely sour and salty Japanese plums frequently placed in the center of rice balls.
Vinegar		Euro-American, Asia	Acidic cooking liquids used for pickling and dressings, with sweet rice vinegar and fruity apple cider vinegar being the most common local choices.

== Drinks and beverages ==
Name	Image	Influence	Description
‘Awa		Hawaiʻi (Native Hawaiian)	A beverage brewed from the roots of the kava plant. It is also used in traditional Kanaka maoli cultural practices and as a form of traditional medicine.
Blue Hawaii		Hawaiʻi	A tropical cocktail made of rum, blue curaçao, pineapple juice, and sweet and sour mix, invented in Honolulu.
Coffee		Euro-American, Hawaiʻi	Kona coffee is the most well-known variety, but coffee crops are cultivated throughout the islands.
Guava nectar		Hawaiʻi	A sweet, thick fruit beverage produced from puréed pink guavas.
Hawaiian Punch		United States	A sweet fruit juice brand originally created in 1934 as a cocktail syrup flavor extension.
Liliko'i nectar		Hawaiʻi	A tart and sweet fruit juice beverage produced from local yellow passion fruit.
Mai Tai		United States	A classic rum-based cocktail heavily popularized by and associated with mid-century Hawaiian tourism.
Māmaki herbal tea		Hawaiʻi (Native Hawaiian)	An herbal tea infusion brewed using the leaves of the endemic māmaki nettle shrub.
ʻŌkolehao		Hawaiʻi (Native Hawaiian), English	Often called oke, this traditional Hawaiian moonshine is distilled from fermented roots of the ti plant. It evolved after English sailors introduced distillation techniques in the late 1700s.
Passion fruit-Orange-Guava (POG)		Hawaiʻi	A popular tropical juice blend created in 1971 by Mary Soon at the Haleakala Dairy on Maui.
Pineapple juice		Hawaiʻi	A staple fruit beverage long linked to the history of commercial plantation agricultural operations on the islands.
Tea		China, United States	Introduced in the late 1800s. Farmers re-explored commercial tea farming in the 1980s. Hawaii’s local USDA office, alongside the University of Hawaii’s College of Tropical Agriculture, aided research to establish cultivars. Today there are approximately two dozen active tea farms in Hawaii.
ʻUala ʻawaʻawa		Hawaiʻi (Native Hawaiian)	An alcoholic beverage made from the fermented poi of sweet potatoes (ʻuala).

== See also ==
- Polynesian cuisine
- Oceanic cuisine
