= Musubi =

Musubi may refer to:

- Onigiri, also known as o-musubi, a Japanese snack
- Spam musubi, popular in Hawaii
- Göteborg musubi, a Hawaiian food
- Musubi, a character in Sekirei
- Decorative knots made to support obi sashes
- Musuhi, a religious concept in Shinto
