= Gomashio =

Japanese condiment made from sesame and salt

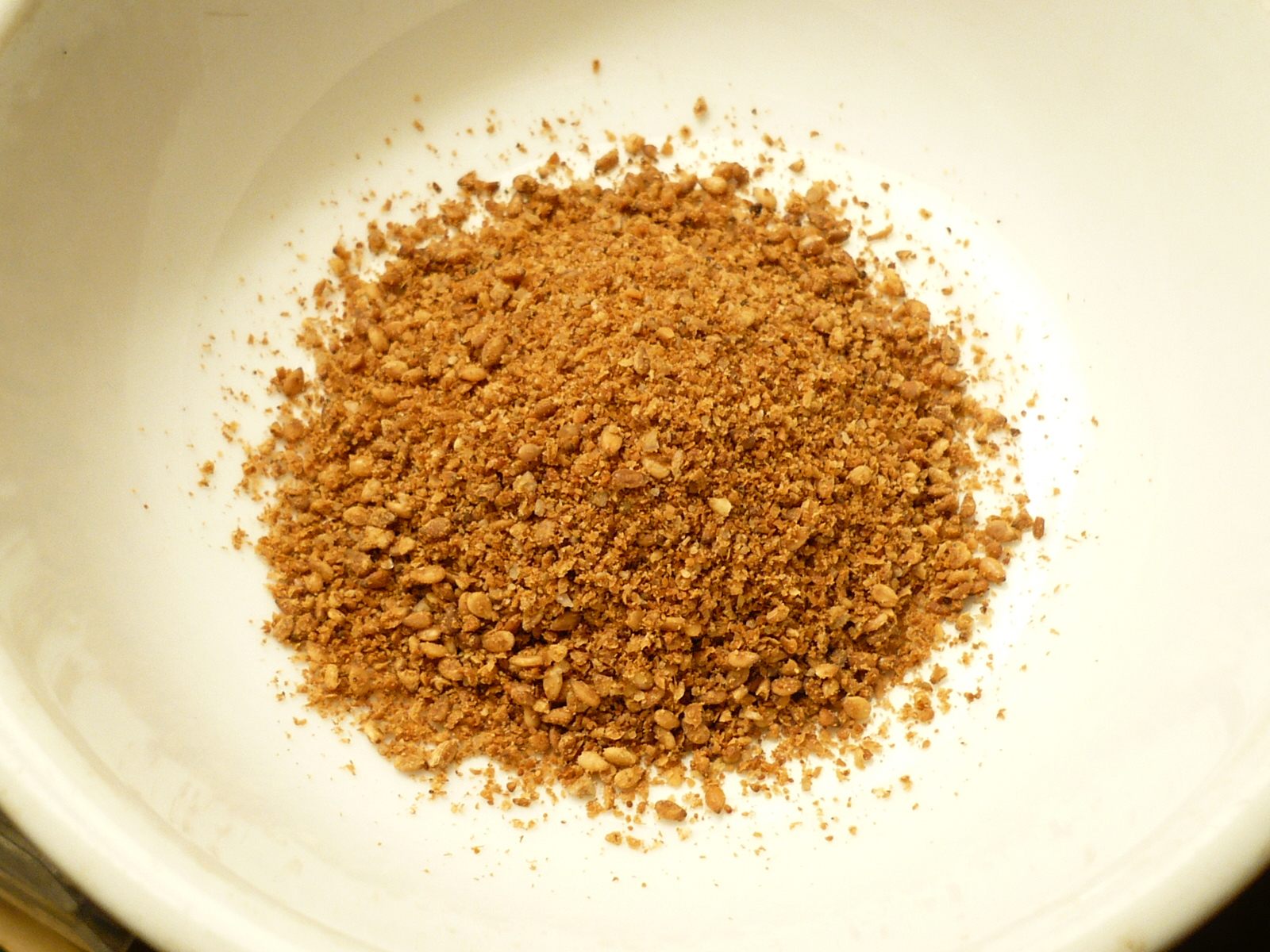
- Gomashio, or sesame salt
- Type: Condiment
- Place of origin: Japan
- Main ingredients: Sesame seeds, salt

Gomashio (hiragana: ごま塩) is a dry condiment, similar to furikake, made from unhulled sesame seeds (ごま, goma) and salt (塩, shio). It is often used in Japanese cuisine, such as a topping for sekihan. It is also sometimes sprinkled over plain rice or onigiri. Some commercially sold gomashio also has sugar mixed in with the salt.

== Composition and use ==
The sesame seeds used to make gomashio may be either tan or black in color. They are toasted before being mixed with the salt. Occasionally the salt is also toasted. The ratio of sesame seeds to salt varies according to taste and diet, generally ranging between 5:1 (5 parts sesame seeds to 1 part salt) and 15:1. Gomashio is often homemade, though it is also commercially available in glass or plastic containers.

Gomashio is also a part of the macrobiotic diet, where it is used as a healthier alternative to ordinary salt. Generally, the gomashio used in macrobiotic cuisine will contain less salt than traditional Japanese gomashio (a ratio of 18 parts sesame seeds to 1 part salt is recommended for some individuals with a particularly restricted diet) and made by hand grinding in a suribachi.

The word gomashio is also used in the Japanese language to describe a head of hair containing both white and black hair strands that intermingle, similar to the English idiom "salt and pepper".

== See also ==
- List of sesame seed dishes
