= Kanemitsu Bakery =

Bakery and restaurant on the island of Molokaʻi

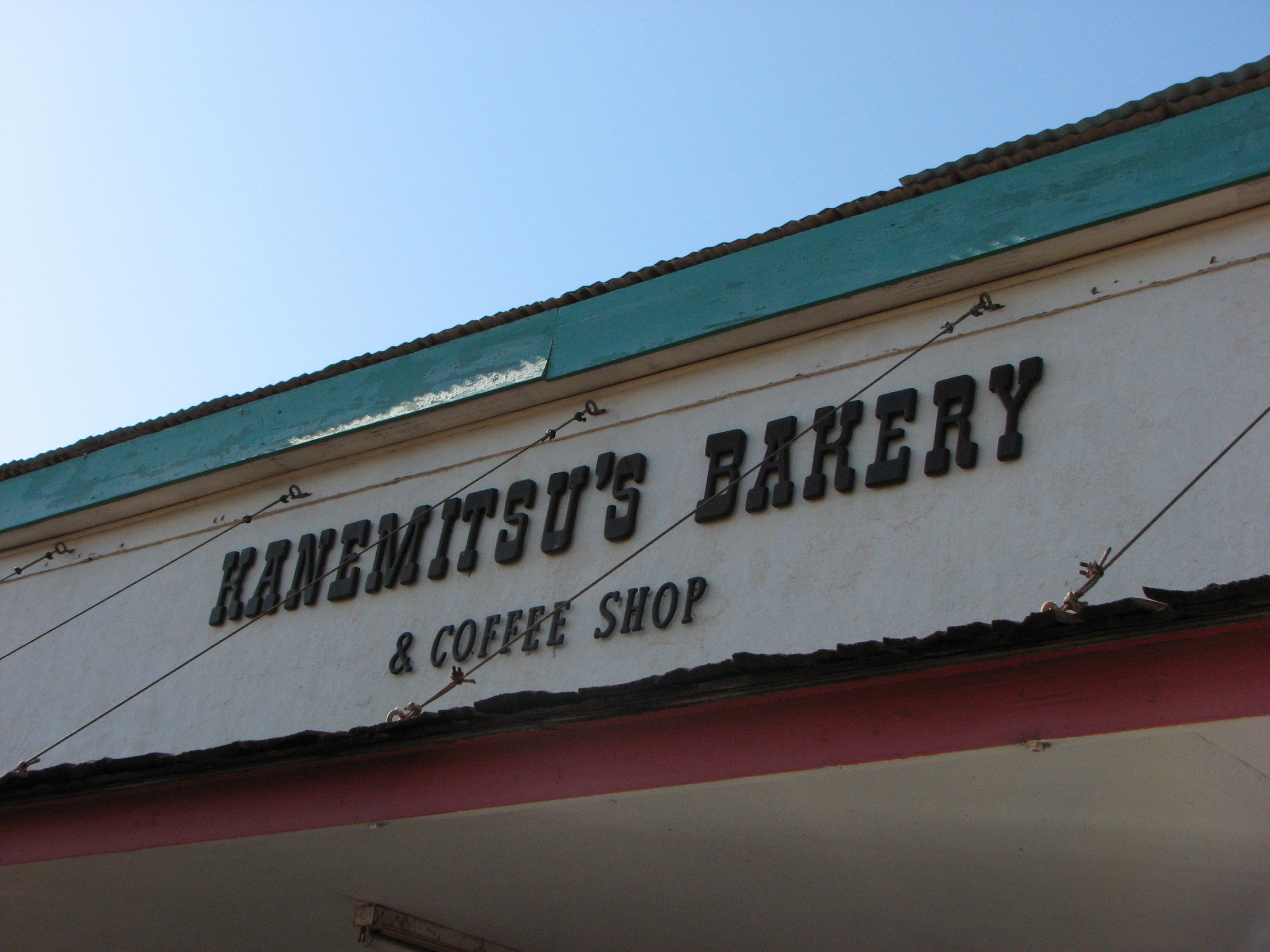
Kanemitsu's Bakery

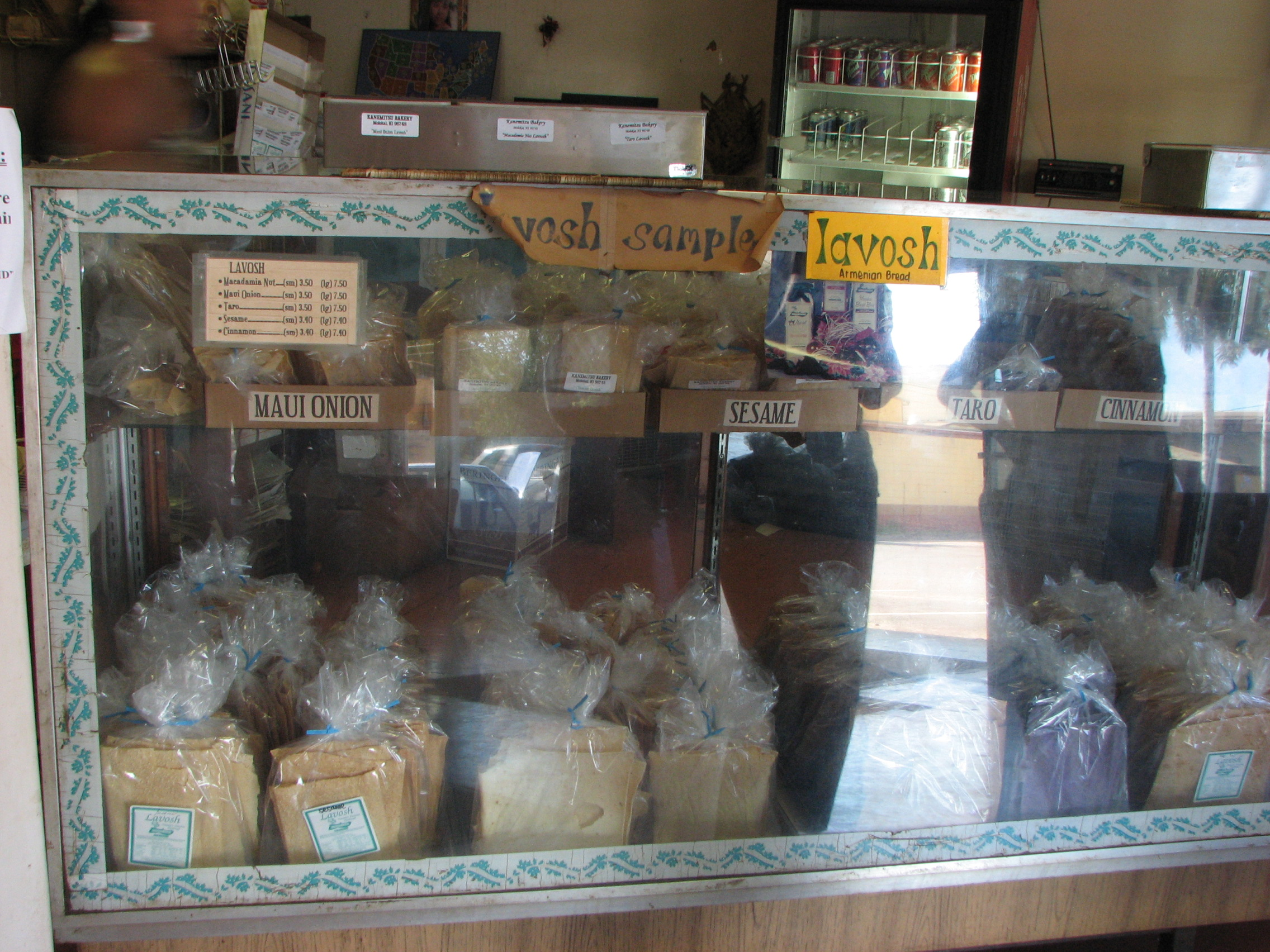
Kanemitsu Bakery counter selling lavosh (Molokai, Hawaii)

Kanemitsu Bakery in Kaunakakai on the Hawaiian island of Molokai is a bakery known for its baked goods and the "hot bread" served out of its back door at night.

Kanemitsu Bakery serves a "hot bread" described as a "pillowy loaf" late into the night. The loaves are split open and slathered with jelly, cream cheese, butter, cinnamon or sugar. The bakery also serves "melt-in-your-mouth Krispy Kreme-like glazed doughnuts". A New York Times story on the island noted, "With a stop at the deceptively derelict-looking Kanemitsu Bakery (whose papaya bread and sweet bread made fabulous toast), we always had the makings of a feast."

The bakery was founded in about 1935 by the brothers Shigeo and Fred Kanemitsu and is still owned and operated by George S. Kanemitsu, the son of Shigeo. It was originally located in Manila Camp, a half-mile to the west, but relocated to its present location in Kaunakakai town in 1945.

In 2018 the bakery was a semifinalist for the James Beard Foundation Award in the Outstanding Baker category.

== See also ==
- List of restaurants in Hawaii
