= Snow puffies =

Hawaii adopted French pastry

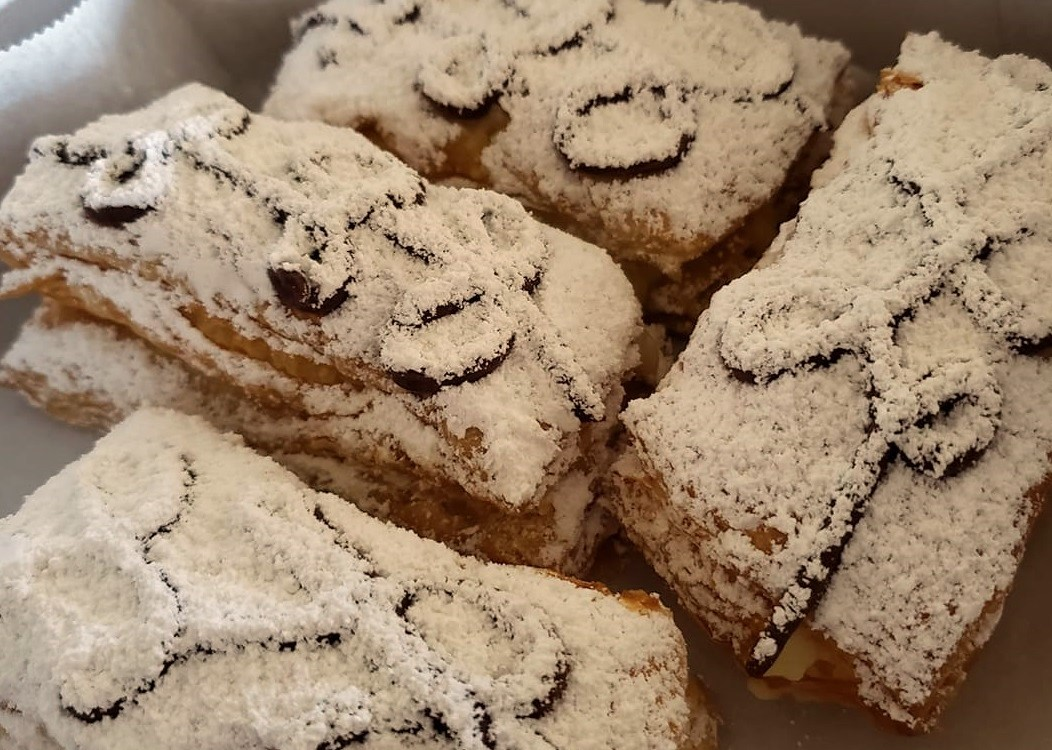
- Snow puffies with fudge piping dusted with powdered sugar
- Alternative names: gâteau de mille-feuilles, vanilla slice or custard slice, Napoleon, Napoleon pastry
- Type: Pastry
- Course: Dessert
- Place of origin: Hawaii
- Created by: Paʻalaʻa Kai Bakery
- Main ingredients: Puff pastry, pastry cream, chocolate fudge, powdered sugar
- Variations: Filling: Jell-O pudding, haupia, ube, lilikoi; Topping: nutella

Snow puffies (singular snow puffy) are a variation of a mille-feuille popularized by Paʻalaʻa Kai Bakery in Waialua. Snow puffies are a popular dessert in Hawaii often purchased as omiyage or recreated by home pastry chefs.

== Background ==
A mille-feuille—also known as "napoleon", "vanilla slice", and "custard slice"—is a dessert of French origin made of puff pastry layered with pastry cream.

These "napoleons" should not be confused with "Napoleon's Bakery" which is a bakery division of Zippy's Restaurants, or for their trademarked "Napple" which are baked puff pastry turnovers. It may be one reason why "snow puffies" were aptly named. Zippy's now has an equivalent product called a "custard puff". It is worth noting that turnover pastries are sealed with filling before cooking, while traditional mille-feuille, the custard filling is applied to the pastry after it is baked.

== Preparation ==
Unlike traditional mille-feuille, the baked puff pastries are not trimmed. Sheets of raw puffy pastry are pre-cut into 3x6 inch rectangles that are baked. The pastry cream is extruded into the baked puff pastry using a filling device similar to a jelly doughnut. A conventional method is using a pastry bag. Thicker puff pastry layers can be separated to expose the interior for the cream to be applied. The top of the pastry is then decorated with a chocolate fudge piping, then generously dusted with powdered sugar.

Utensils are required when consuming a mille-feuille. Snow puffies are less formal and can be held like a donut. The pastry cream has a tendency of spilling from the pastry.

== See also ==
- List of custard desserts
- Mille-feuille, original French version
- Napoleonka, a Polish version
- Cremeschnitte, a German version
- Milhojas, a Spanish version
