= Chinese shortbread =

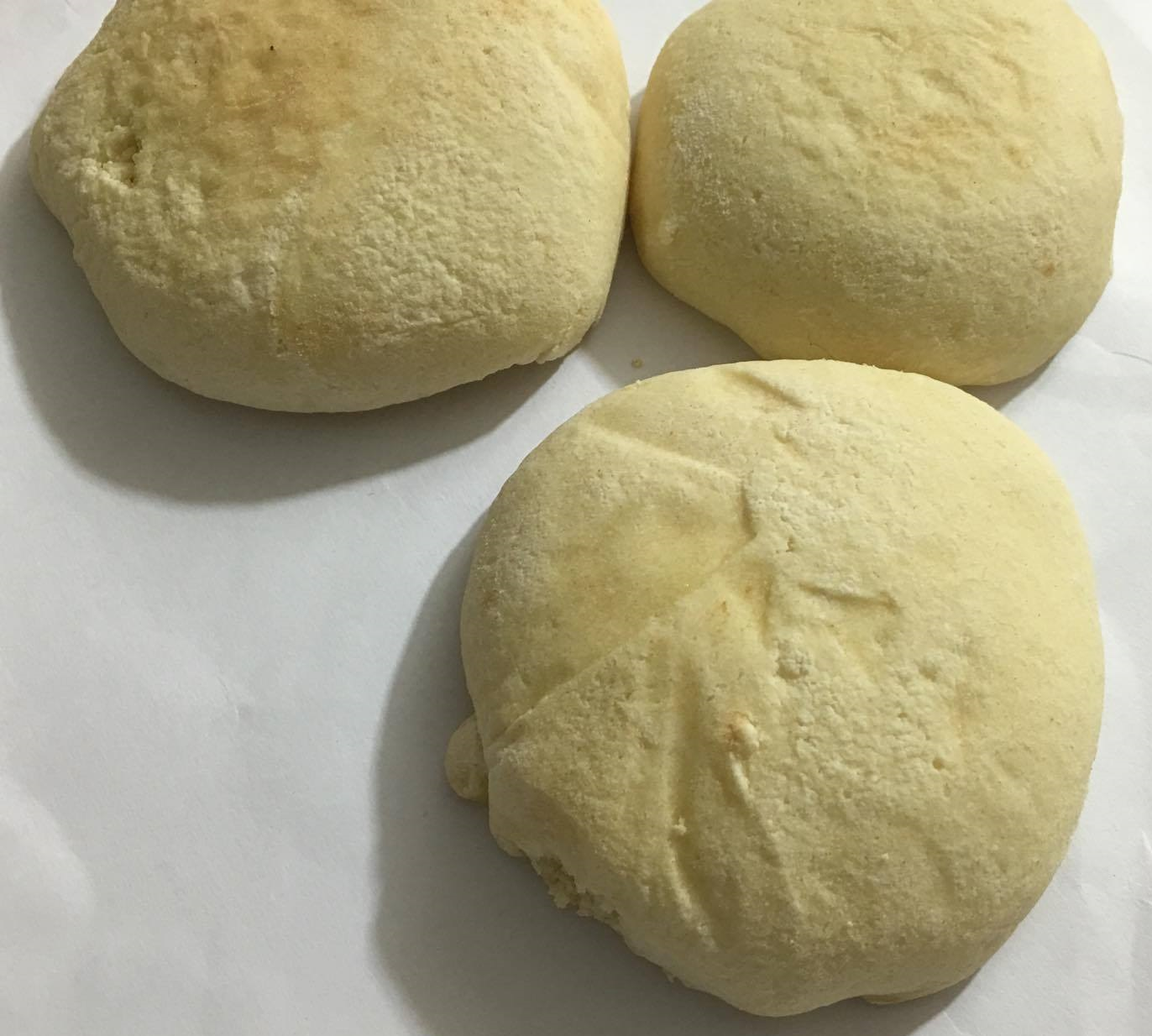
Chinese shortbread

Chinese shortbread (Chinese: 光酥餅) is a Chinese snack. It is round shaped, and white or yellow in colour. There may have cracks on the surface of the shortbread. It is fluffy in texture and sweet in taste.

== Ingredients ==
Commonly used ingredients are:

- Flour
- Water
- White sugar
- Baking powder
- Corn starch
- Egg white

== See also ==
- White sugar sponge cake
