= Spam musubi =

Spam and rice wrapped with nori

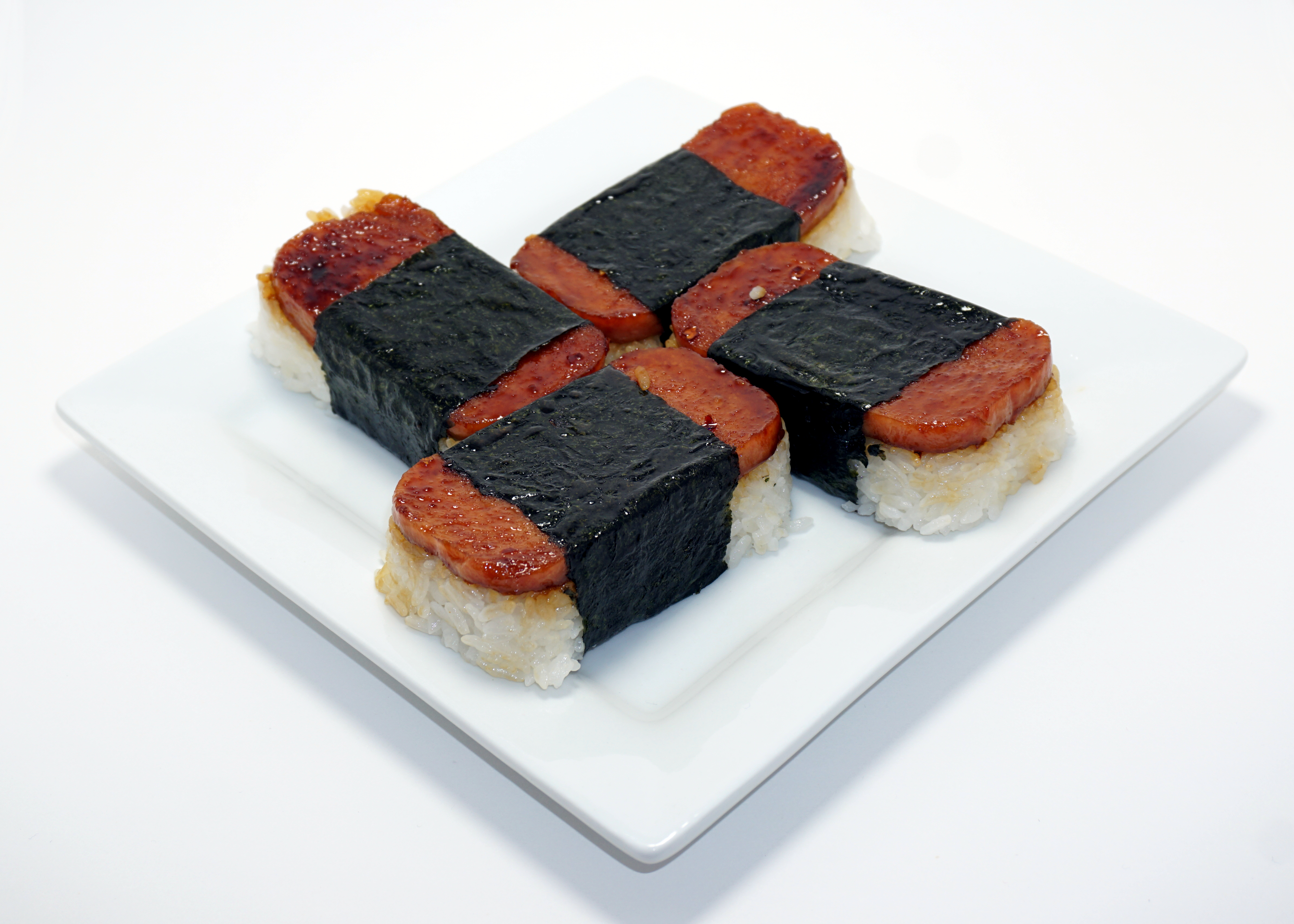
- Spam musubi made from Spam and rice
- Course: Snack
- Place of origin: United States
- Region or state: Hawaii
- Serving temperature: Hot or cold
- Main ingredients: Spam, rice, nori, soy sauce

Spam musubi is a snack and lunch food composed of a slice of grilled Spam sandwiched either in between or on top of a block of rice, wrapped together with nori in the tradition of Japanese onigiri.

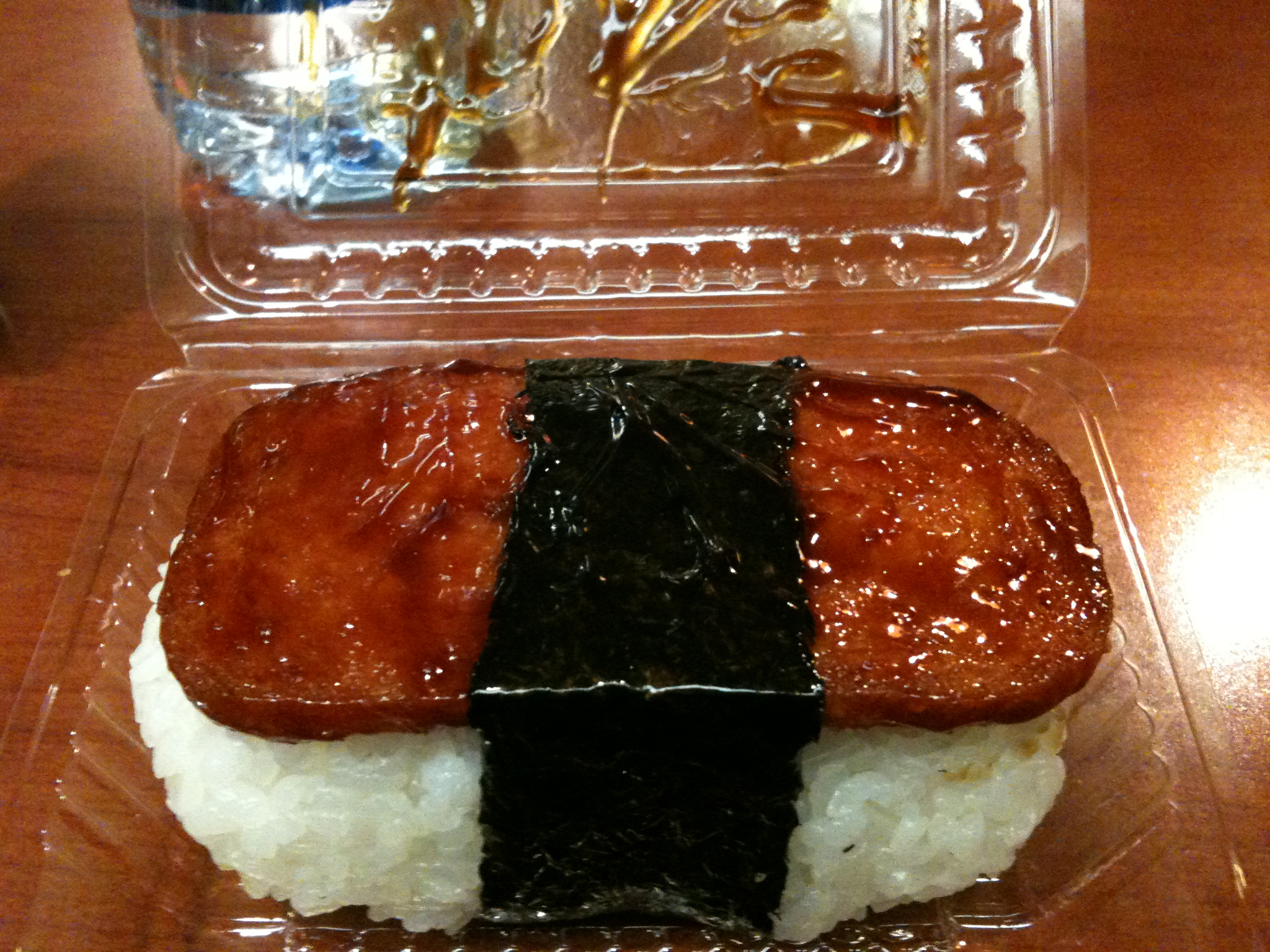
Spam musubi is commonly sold in convenience stores packaged in plastic boxes.

Inexpensive and portable, Spam musubi is commonly found near cash registers in convenience stores or mom-and-pop shops all over Hawaii and in Hawaiian barbecue restaurants in the mainland United States. Musubi typically only uses spam, rice, some salt, nori and shoyu (soy sauce), but other toppings can be added. In Hawaii, spam musubi is commonly eaten as a snack or served in formal restaurants.

== History ==
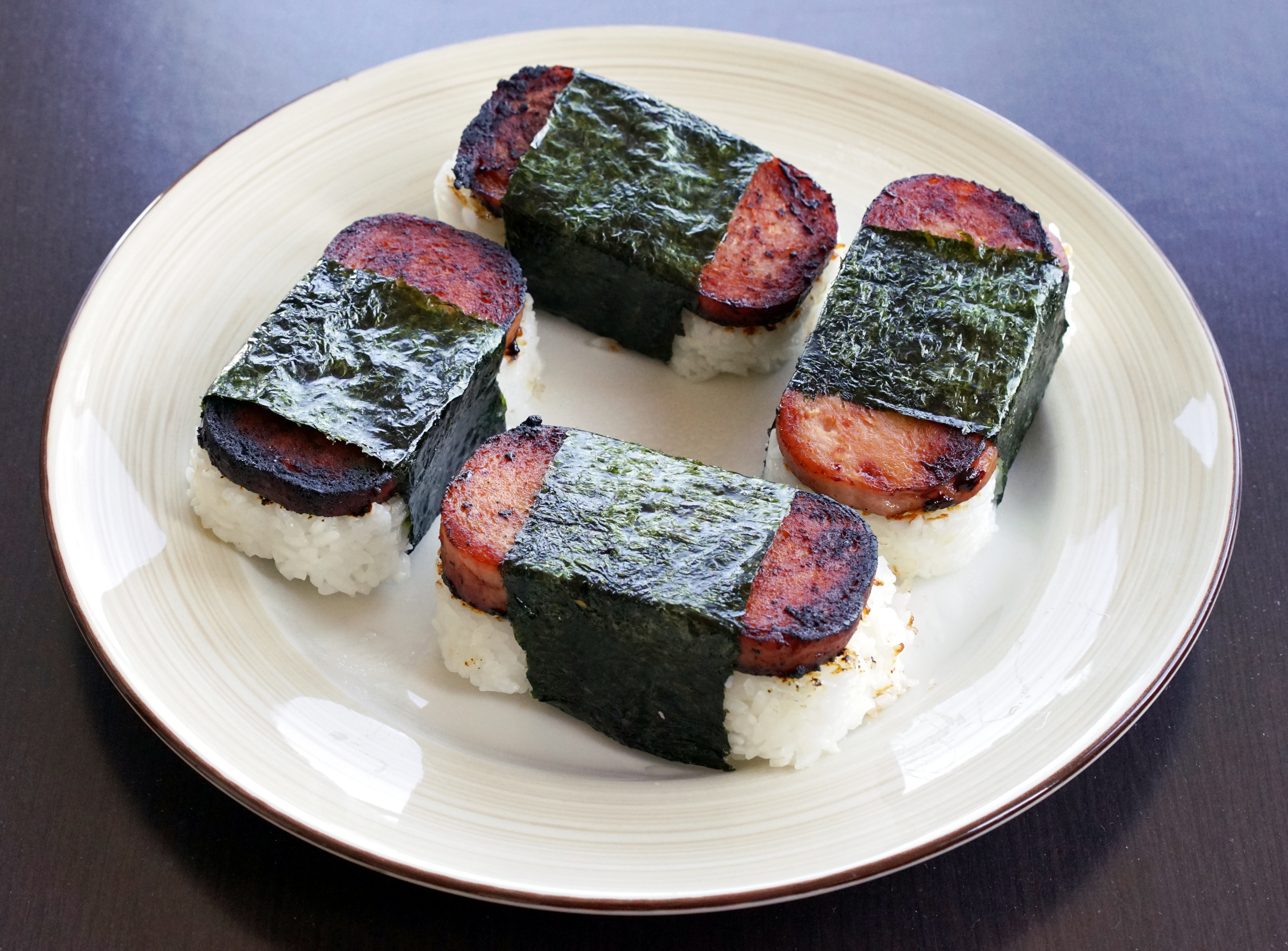
Spam musubi can be served on a plate.

Spam musubi is a form of musubi that originally came from Hawaii, a popular item in the lunchboxes of Hawaiian plantation workers.

The origin of Spam musubi is disputed. Survivors of the Japanese American internment camps on the mainland of the United States claim to have invented the precursor to Spam musubi, when they placed seasoned slices of Spam on white rice in a baking pan. However, most origin stories focus on Spam's ubiquity in Hawaii during and in the aftermath of World War II. With few other options, the canned meat was incorporated into local cuisines wherever American troops were stationed. For example, South Korea's budae-jjigae, a stew of surplus U.S. military foods, included Spam. In the United Kingdom, where Spam was ubiquitous during the hardship of the postwar years, Spam acquired a stigma exemplified by the 1970 Monty Python sketch. Spam may not have been abandoned in the Pacific like it was in the UK simply because of the comparative economic deprivation experienced in the Pacific region.

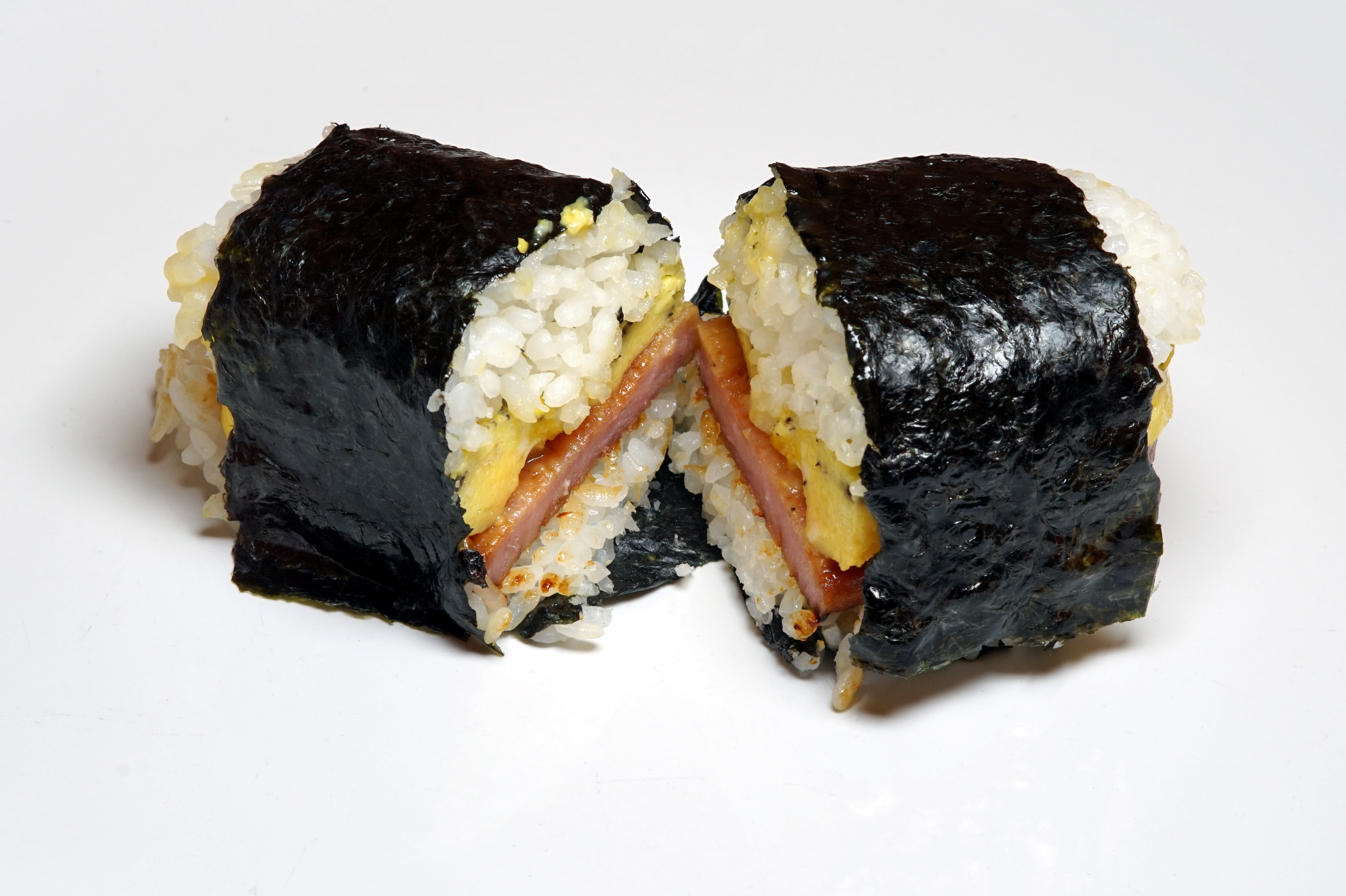
Spam and egg musubi sandwich

The Honolulu Star-Bulletin said of Spam musubi in 2002, "There is no definitive history for this aberration." Still, the newspaper relayed that a 2001 cookbook stated that the potential creator is Mitsuko Kaneshiro, who began selling them out of City Pharmacy on Pensacola Street in Honolulu and by the early 1980s was selling 500 handmade Spam musubi servings a day out of her own shop, Michan's Musubi. The other person said to be the creator of Spam musubi is Barbara Funamura of Kauai, who sold it out of the Joni-Hana Restaurant in the Kukui Grove Center. The Garden Island in 1983 described it as, "Spam and rice, two local favorites, are combined in an enormous musubi (rice ball) wrapped in nori (sheets of dried seaweed)." Eventually, Funamura's musubi was made using a box mold, taking on its familiar form.

In 1999, L&L Hawaiian Barbecue introduced the Hawaii regional snack as a menu item in its first mainland U.S. restaurant in Puente Hills, California. As the Hawaii-based chain grew across several American states, so did the awareness and popularity of the snack, eventually becoming a mainstay on the menu, and making L&L the first restaurant chain to make the snack available nationally.

On August 8, 2021, L&L Hawaiian Barbecue established "National Spam Musubi Day" to celebrate the iconic snack from Hawaii. The holiday was officially recognized by Hawaii Governor David Y. Ige with a public proclamation.

Spam musubi is the serving suggestion on tins of teriyaki-flavored Spam. Spam musubi eaten with egg is sometimes called potama (a portmanteau of pork and tamago, the Japanese word for egg) and is a staple of Okinawan cuisine. The nori is generally larger and wraps the entire sandwich.

== Preparation ==
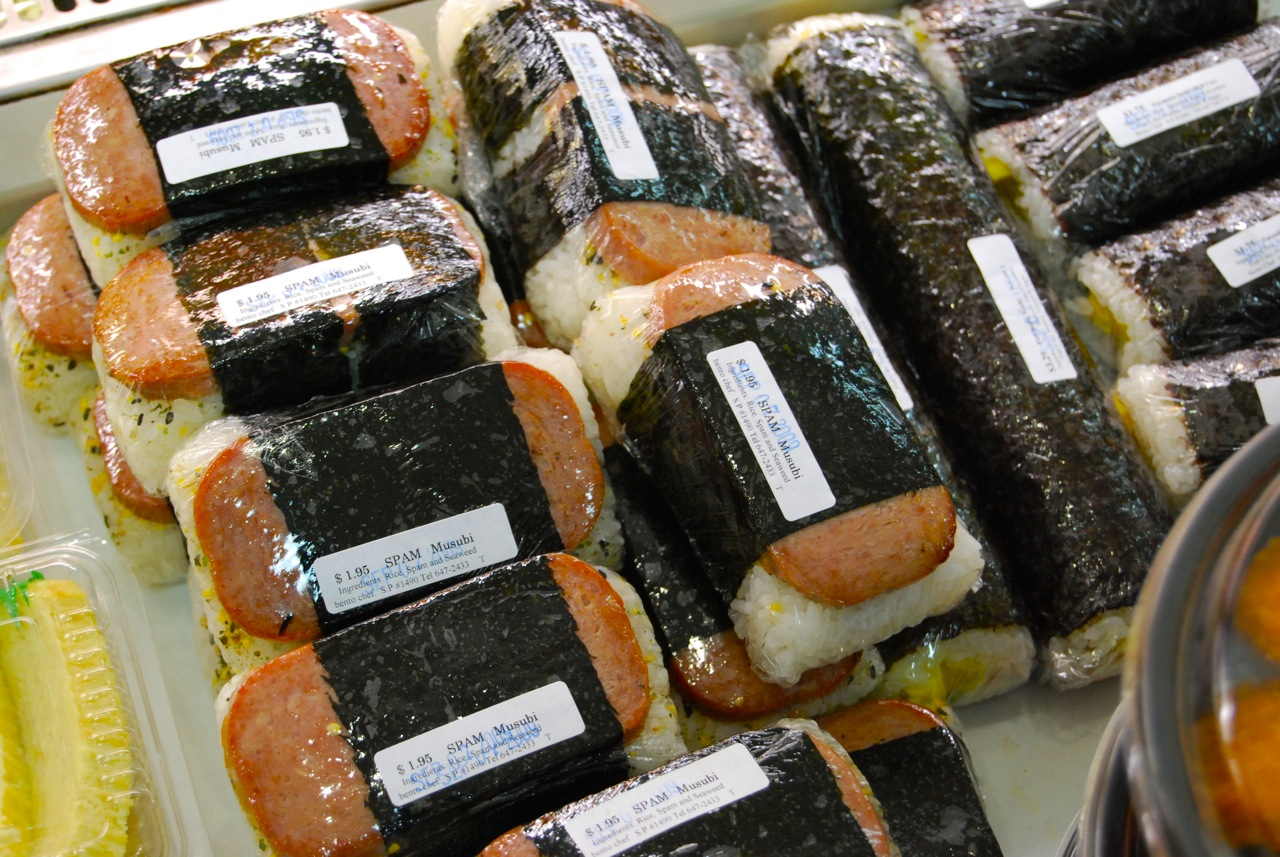
Spam musubi sold in Guam

Typical preparation begins with grilling or frying slices of Spam, commonly with the original flavor or with the teriyaki flavor. It uses a sauce in which soy sauce and granulated sugar are typically the basic ingredients. Using a mold the same size as a slice of Spam, a layer of cooked rice is pressed down over a strip of nori, with a slice of Spam on top of that, and then, optionally, another layer of rice. The mold is removed and the nori is wrapped over the top and around the musubi. Guam's Pacific Daily News describes the local version: "a slice of Spam is bathed in teriyaki sauce before topping a mound of rice with a dash of furikake and wrapped in a strip of nori." Another Guam recipe calls for Sriracha mayonnaise.

== See also ==
- Cuisine of Hawaii – Food and drinks from Hawaii
- Göteborg musubi – Göteborg musubi from Kauai, Hawaii
- Loco moco – Dish in Hawaiian cuisine, another Hawaiian dish that can involve rice and Spam
