= Goteborg musubi =

Göteborg musubi from Kauai, Hawaii

Göteborg musubi
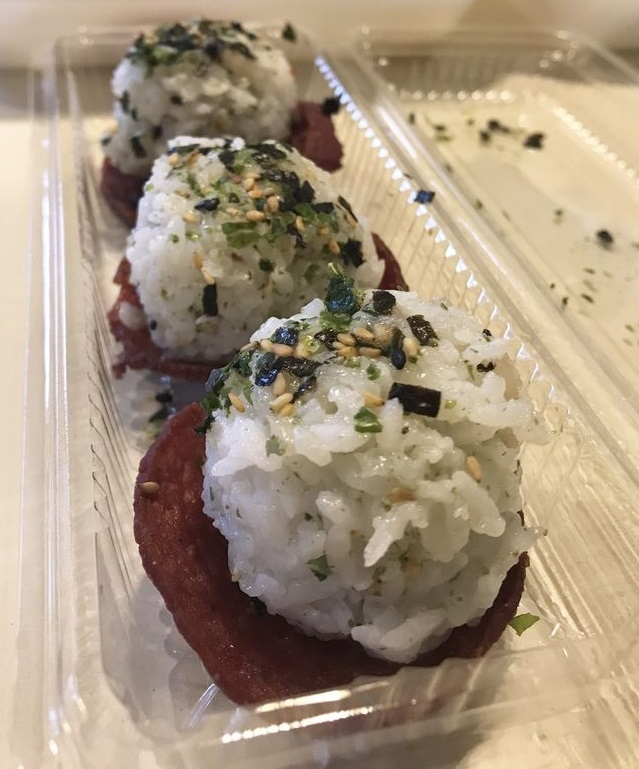
- 3-pack Goteborg sausage musubi
- Alternative names: UFO
- Course: Snack
- Place of origin: United States
- Region or state: Kauai (Hawaii)
- Serving temperature: Hot or room temperature
- Main ingredients: Göteborg sausage, rice
- Variations: SPAM musubi

Goteborg musubi (anglicized from Göteborg), or UFOs, is a food from Hawaii that combines a slice of Goteborg sausage with an onigiri rice ball, originally from Germany and Japan, respectively. The Goteborg musubi is commonly associated with the island of Kauai, but have been made and sold throughout Hawaii.

== History ==
=== German connection ===
Often forgotten is the influential German immigration to Hawaii. Three Germans were among the sailors and crew aboard Captain James Cook first visit to the islands in 1778. Occasional visits by Germans would continue. German immigrant Hermann A. Widemann established one of the first sugar plantations in Hawaii in 1854, Grove Farms. Rather than relying on Asian coolie labor, as fellow German sugar plantation owner Claus Spreckels did on his Spreckelsville Plantation on Maui, German sugar plantation owners on Kauai, including Paul Isenberg and Widemann, relied on fellow countrymen instead. Around 1,337 German immigrants arrived between 1881 and 1884, of which 560 men came to work on the plantations. Kauai had the largest German population at 922 where three plantations were operated by Germans.

Germans would bring their culture and foods with them, especially on Kauai where they celebrated German victories in wars leading up to World War I with suppers of "boiled ham, potato salad, Swiss cheese, German sausage, bread, cakes, and cigars." One of these German salami-like sausages may have been mettwurst such as Holsteiner Mettwurst, which closely resembles in ingredients, preparation, and appearance to the Goteborg sausage known today.

=== Göteborg sausages ===
Goteborg sausages, named after the second largest city in Sweden, are a type of summer sausage of beef and pork. Being a cured, dried, and smoked sausage, cooking it is not necessary, and like other summer sausages, it historically could be kept without refrigeration. This was especially desirable during periods of high temperatures where fresh meats would otherwise spoil and where refrigeration was not available. Most Goteborg sausages sold in Hawaii today are made by Hormel, the same makers of the popular SPAM.

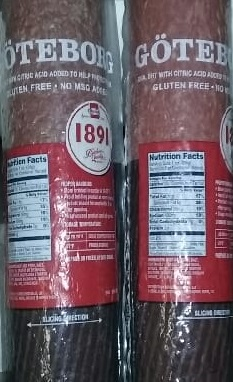
Hormel 1891 Goteborg Sausages

Despite the Swedish name, the sausage itself is of German origin. However, World War I would end up leaving a bitter taste. The nativism and anti-German sentiment would be felt across the globe. Every German sounding name would be renamed, from food, dog breeds, family names, even to entire towns H. Hackfeld & Co., which would be later known as American Factors and one of the Hawaii "Big Five" companies formed by Germans Heinrich Hackfeld and Paul Isenberg, was seized by the US government during World War I.

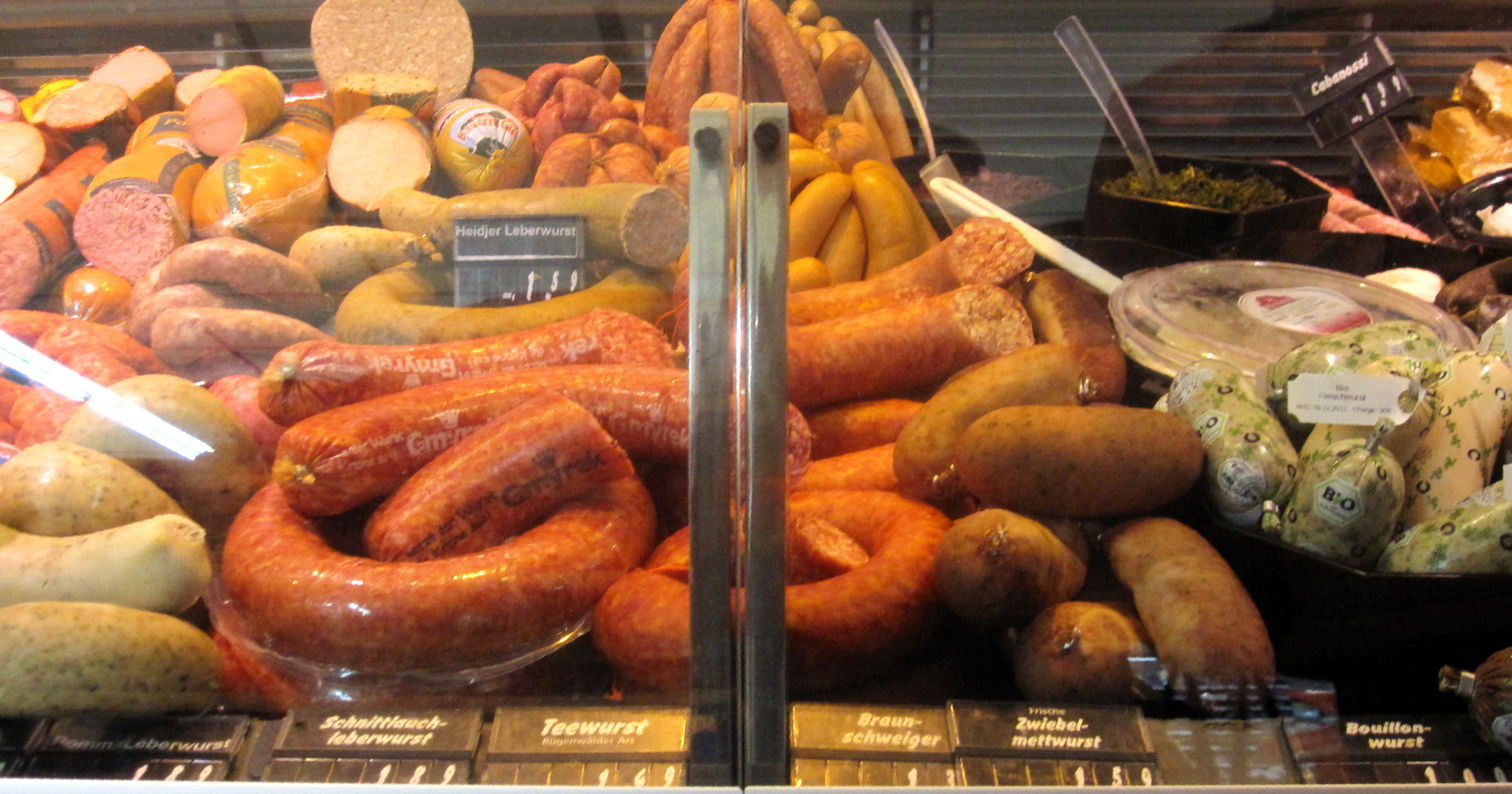
German sausages, Braunschweiger (Mettwurst)

George A. Hormel, who created Hormel Foods Corporation in 1891, himself was of German origin and specialized in sausage making. In 1915, Hormel began selling dry sausages under the names of Cedar Cervelat, Holsteiner and Noxall Salami. Hormel, at one time, featured a roundel of the Danish flag (instead of a Swedish flag) on its Goteborg sausage labels. Denmark borders one of the northernmost regions of Germany, Holstein.

=== Rice ===
Rice was an important food for plantation workers in Hawaii, many of whom were from China, Japan, and the Philippines. Rice provided the carbohydrates essential for the harsh labor involved. In 1907, Chinese long-grain rice would be the second largest crop after sugar, displacing taro pondfields for rice paddies instead. However, as Japanese immigration began outpacing the Chinese population, their preference for short-grain rice (which could be molded into onigiri) imported from California would end the Hawaii rice industry.

=== Today ===
By the 1920s, many of the German plantation workers moved to California after their contracts expired and the few that remained eventually became plantation overseers known as lunas. One unverified source credit a "German stonewall builder" for introducing the sausage to the non-German plantation laborers. Pairing salty food with a neutralizing starchy food is common throughout the world. Nor is it uncommon that foods were made in a compact form to bring into the blue-collar workplace, such as ham sandwiches, Cornish pasties, and onigiri. At this time, the exact creator of the Goteborg musubi is unknown or who first retailed them. (Note: It may have even existed before the more widely known SPAM musubi, as SPAM was created in 1937 by Hormel.)

== Preparation ==
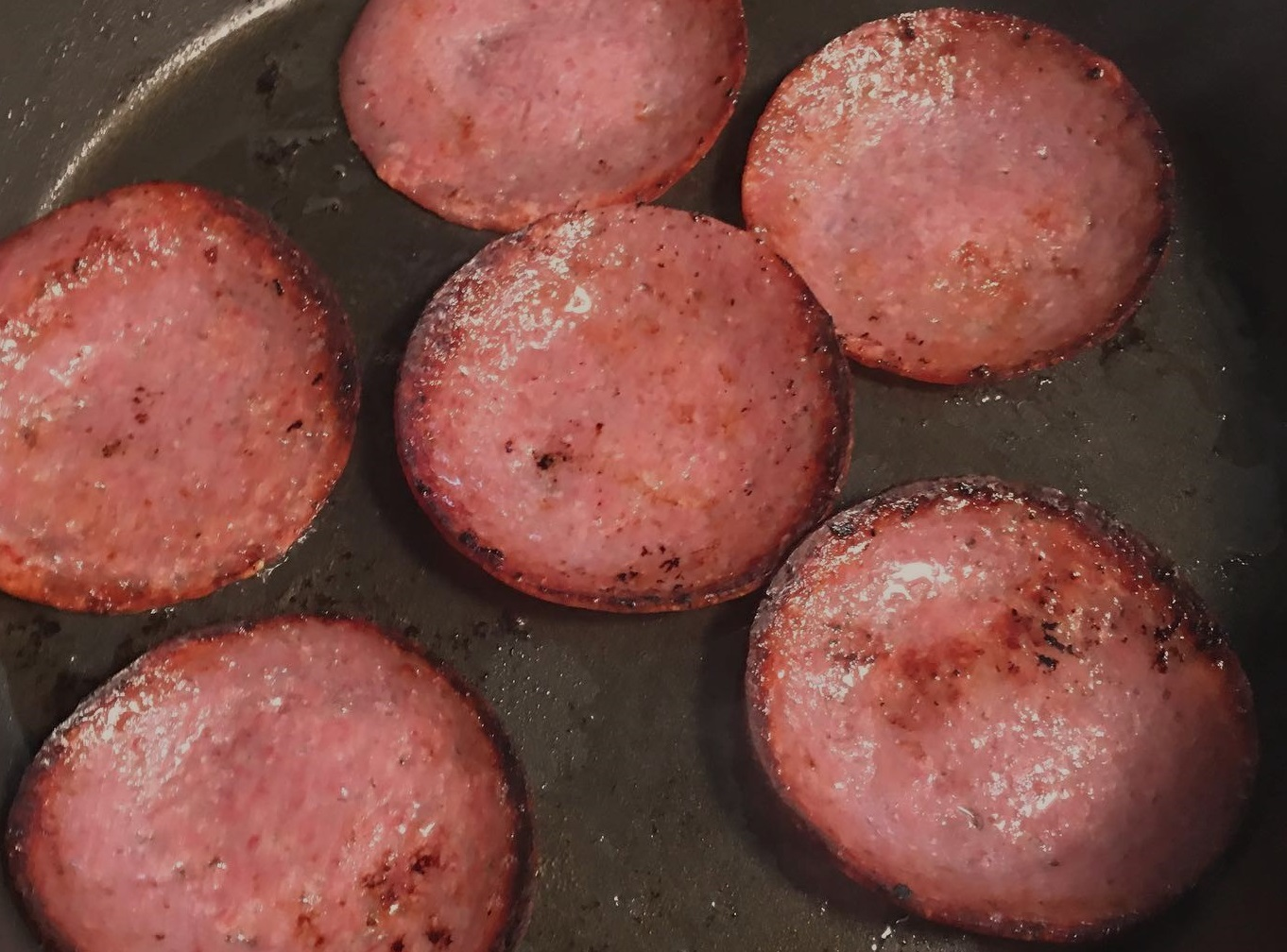
UFOs frying

Goteborg sausage are cut into between 1/8 to 1/4 inches (3-6mm) thick slices and are grilled (without oil) to preferred doneness. Cooking creates a crispier and more pronounced lenticular shape–giving the nickname "UFO" (not to be confused with "Flying Saucers," another Kauai delicacy)–which provides a natural bowl. Rice balls are formed–sometimes with the help of an ice cream scoop–and are placed on the grilled sausage slices. The sausage slice traditionally sits under the rice, but occasionally sits on top. The rice balls are usually sprinkled with furikake or optionally wrapped with nori. Goteborg musubis can be made into a snack, a light lunch or accompaniment to poke, or as a canapé for pūpū.

== See also ==
- Cuisine of Hawaii – Food and drinks from Hawaii
- Onigiri – Japanese rice ball
- SPAM musubi – Spam and rice wrapped with nori
