= Furikake =

Japanese seasoning

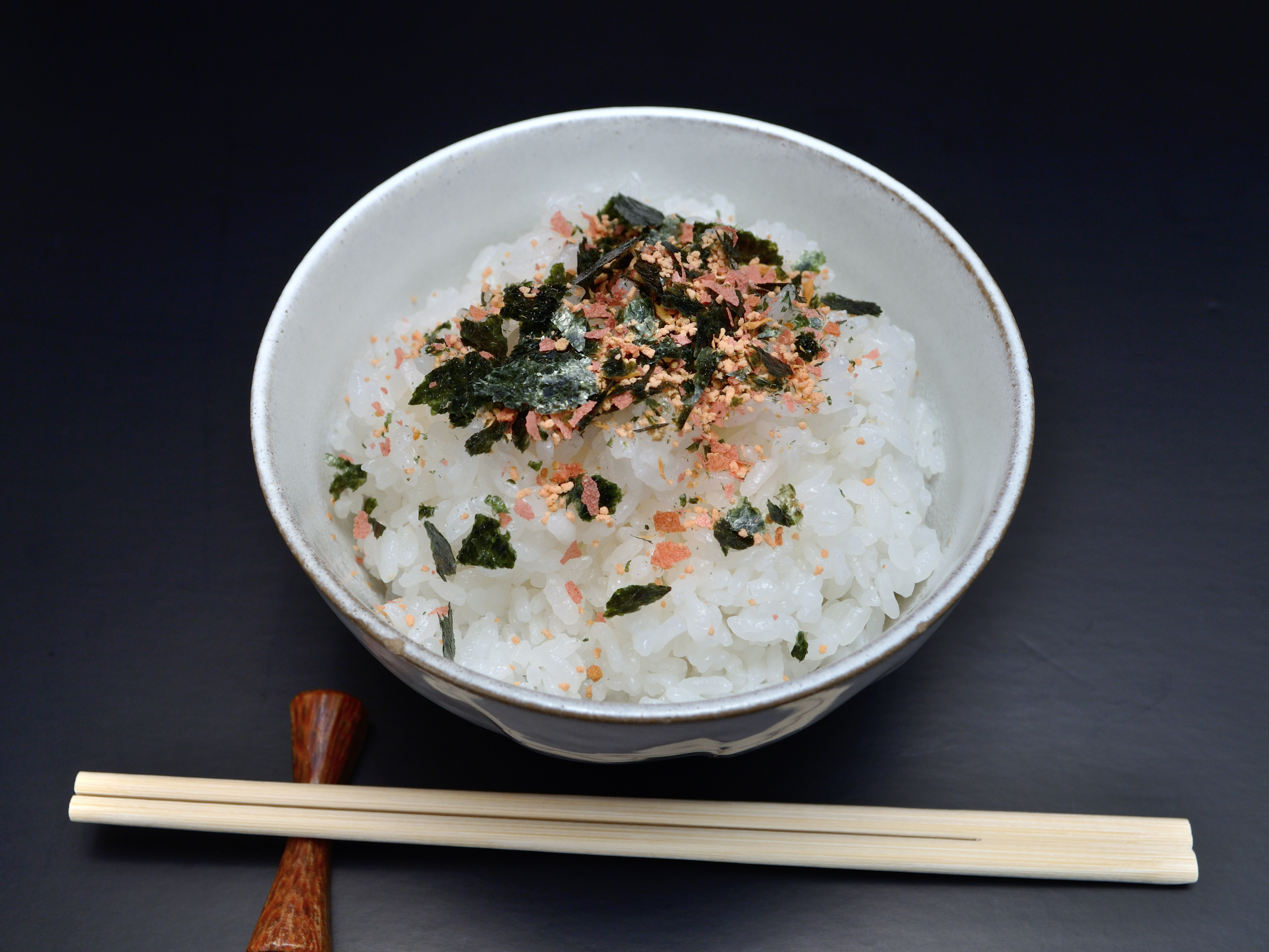
- Furikake sprinkled on rice
- Type: Seasoning
- Place of origin: Japan
- Associated cuisine: Japanese
- Main ingredients: Nori, dried fish, dried roe, sesame, shiso, salt

Furikake (振り掛け, ふりかけ, 振掛け, 振掛) is a dry Japanese condiment sprinkled on top of cooked rice, or used as an ingredient in onigiri. It typically consists of a mixture of dried fish or freeze-dried eggs, sesame seeds, dried seaweed flakes, sugar, and salt. Other ingredients, such as katsuobushi (sometimes indicated on the package as bonito), okaka (bonito flakes moistened with soy sauce and dried again), freeze-dried salmon particles, shiso, egg, powdered miso, or vegetables, are often added.

Furikake is often brightly colored and flaky. It can have a slight fish or seafood flavoring and may be spicy or sweet. It can be used in Japanese cooking for pickling and for rice balls (onigiri).

== Overview ==
The Japan Furikake Association defines furikake as "seasoned and dried one or more kinds of marine products, agricultural products, livestock products, etc., and mixed with seaweed, sesame seeds, seasonings, and others. Its main use is to be sprinkled (in Japanese: furikake) on rice and other foods."

According to this definition, gomashio (sesame salt), which is traditionally sprinkled on red bean rice, and shiso, after being used to season umeboshi (pickled plums) and dried and powdered, are also furikake. Chazuke-no-moto, a mixture that becomes chazuke when hot green tea is poured on it after sprinkling on rice, is also similar to furikake.

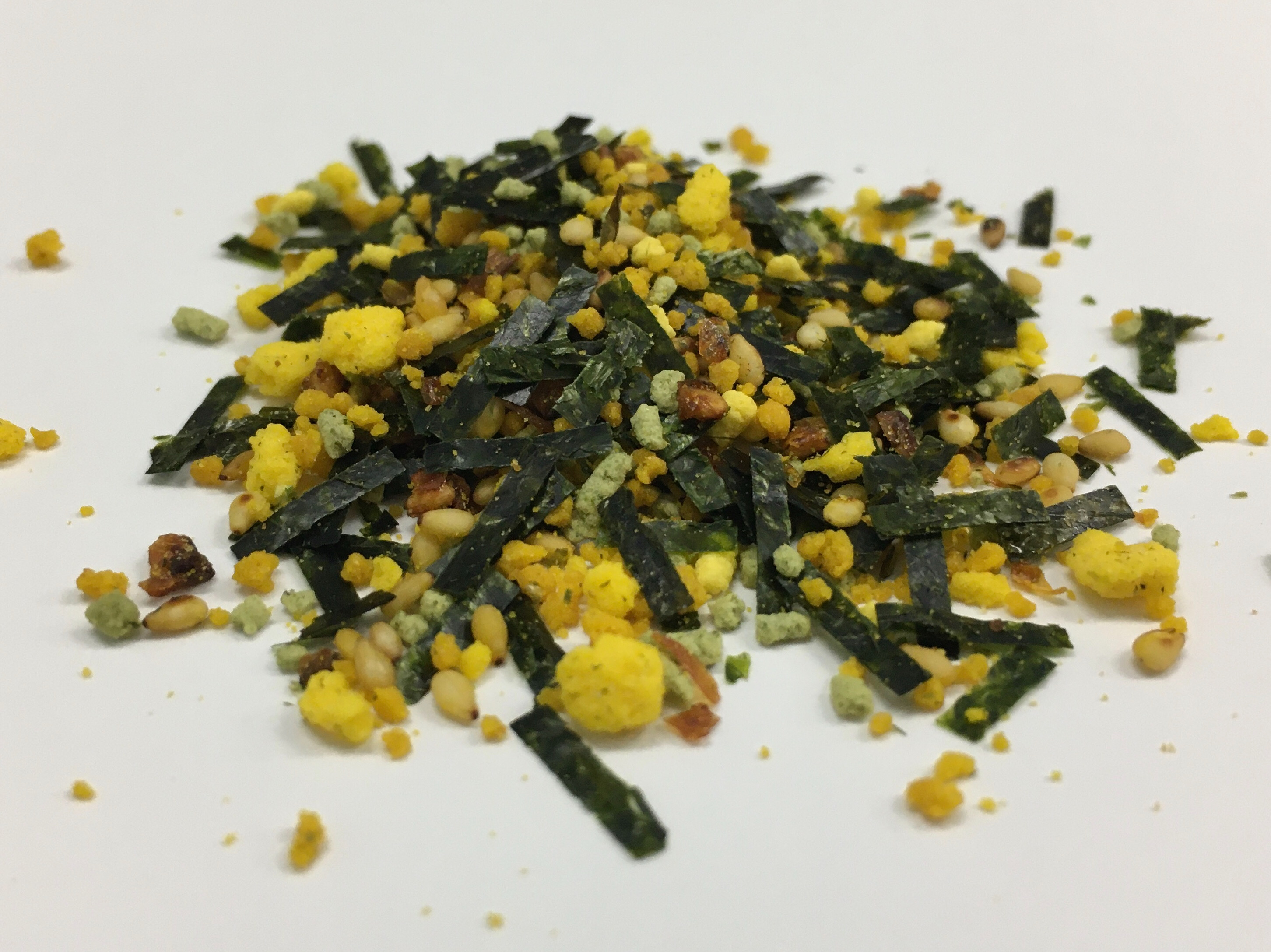
Noritama furikake

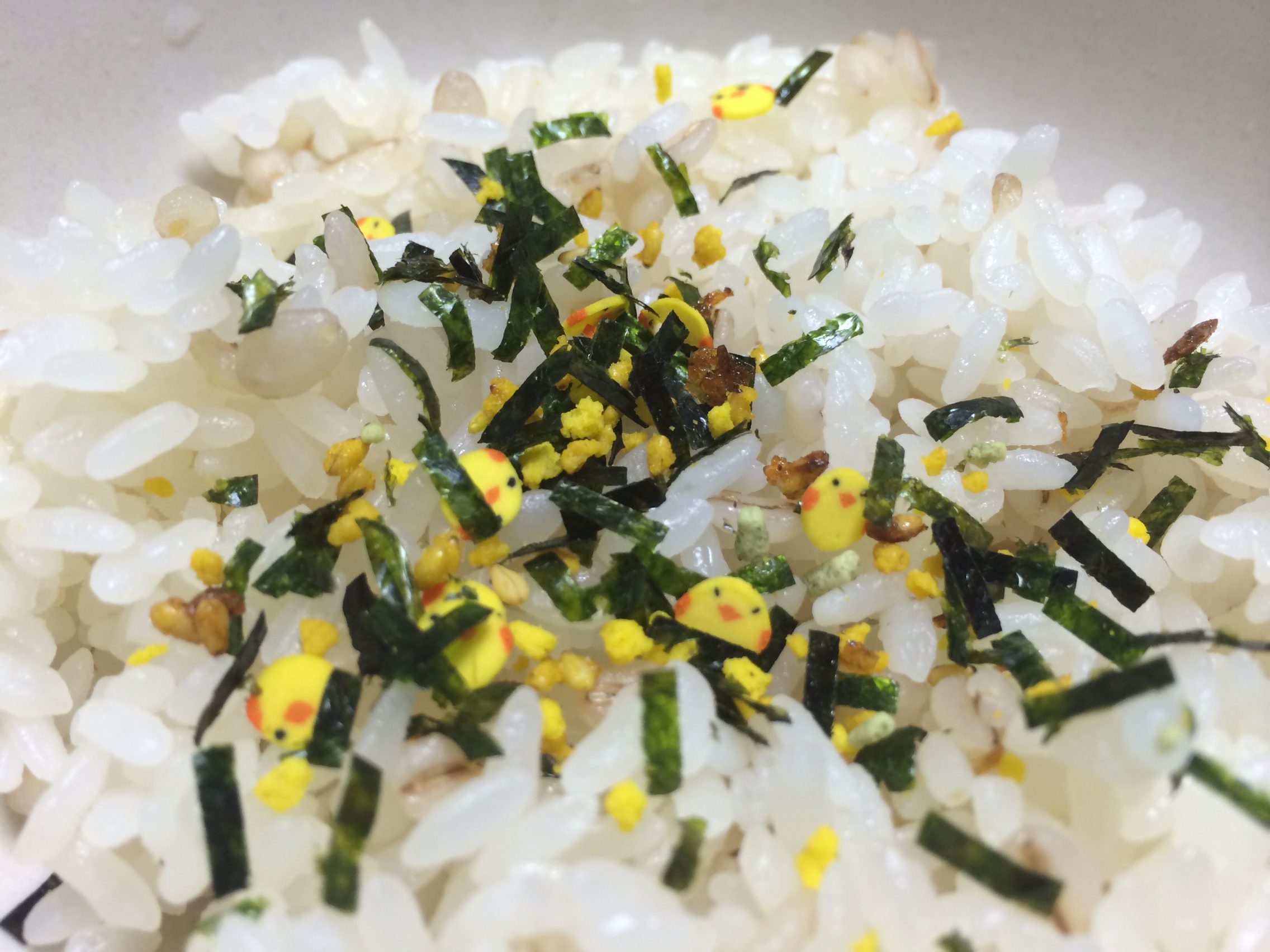
On rice

== History ==
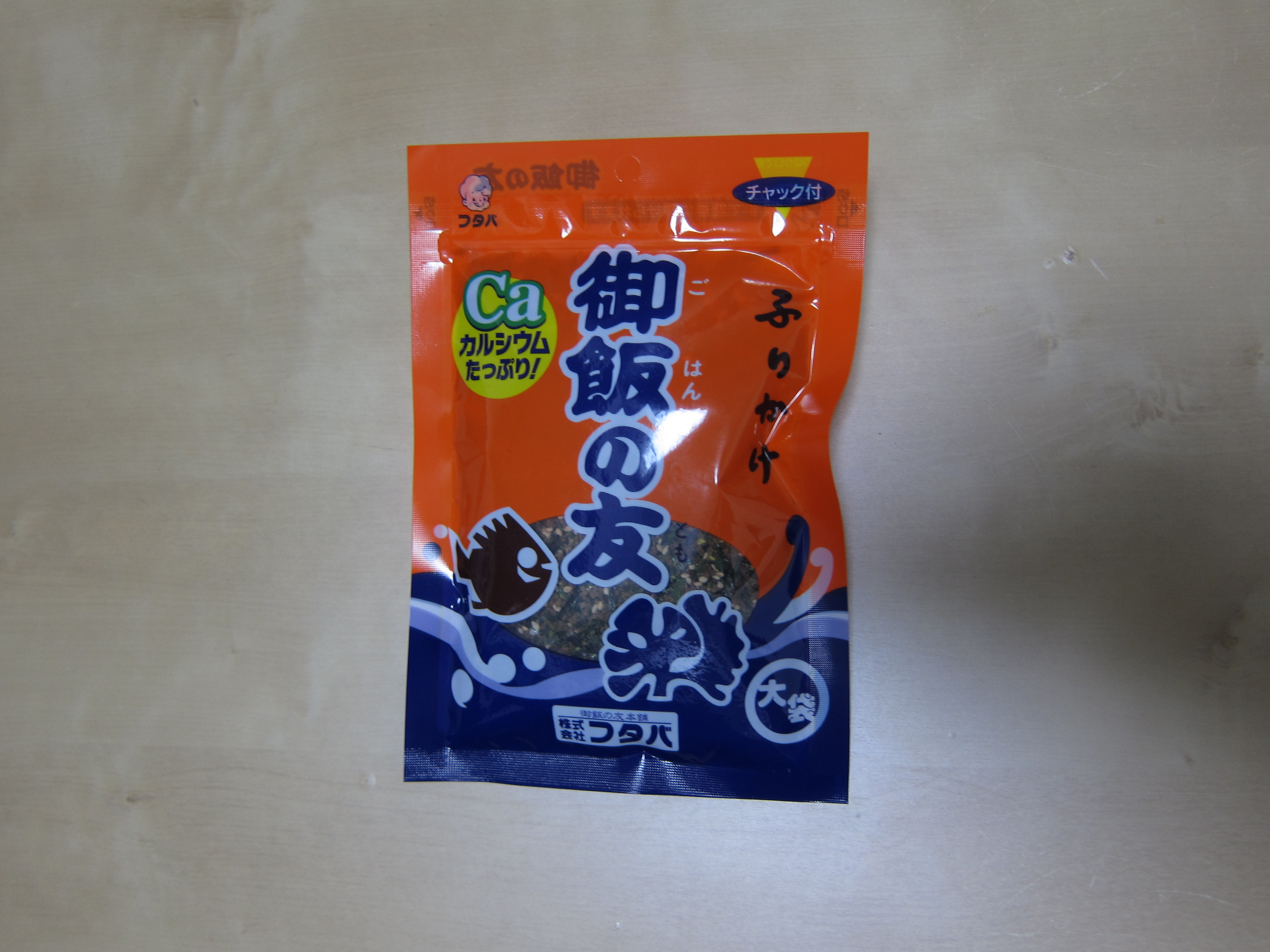
Gohan no Tomo is considered to be an early version of furikake.

In Japan, an herb sprinkling powder on rice or other food has long been called furikake. For example, an article titled "Picnic Bento" published in 1925 describes how to make onigiri: "Make a small onigiri of warm rice and furikake a little roasted-sesame on it."

The term furikake became established in the 1950s, but there were equivalent foods to it even before that.

The 13th-century culinary treatise "Chujiruiki" (厨事類記) lists shredded and dried red seabream, salmon, and shark meat, as well as thin slices of katsuobushi, as garnishes for rice.

Gomashio, which is still commonly eaten today, is made by roasting sesame seeds and mixing them with baked salt, and appears in an ancient document, Diary of Ishiyama Hongan-ji at 1536, under the name "gomashio." In that document, it is written that "on March 3, sekihan (red rice) was served at the celebration, and gomashio was placed on top of it."

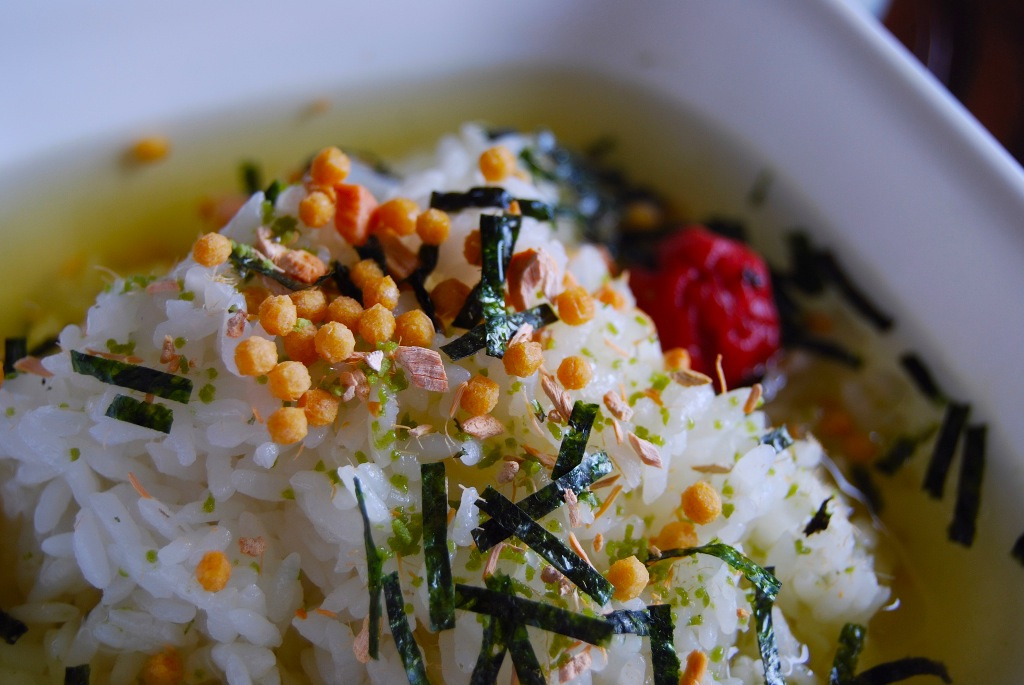
Furikake on ochazuke

Denbu (田麩), a food made by boiling powdered dried bonito flakes in sake and soy sauce, appears in an ancient 17th-century document called "Kokin Ryouri-shu" ("Collection of Ancient and Modern Cookbooks").

Tsukudani (佃煮), which appears in the 19th century colloquial dictionary "Risogonshuran" (俚言集覧) compiled by Ota Zensai (太田全斎), is made by boiling down small fish, shellfish, seaweed, and other ingredients in soy sauce to a rich flavor. The use of tsukudani is similar to furikake, but it is not usually called furikake in Japan today.

The modern furikake was invented by several companies between the 1900s and 1920s for the purpose of tasty nourishment. Regarding modern furikake, the Japan Furikake Association recognized Futaba's "Gohan no Tomo" as the original in 1994, but revoked this recognition in 2022 and is conducting a reexamination. The association's conclusion has not been reached as of 2023.

One account of the origin of furikake is that it was developed during the Taishō period (1912–1926) by a pharmacist in Kumamoto prefecture named Suekichi Yoshimaru (吉丸末吉). To address calcium deficiency in the Japanese population, Yoshimaru developed a mixture of ground fish bones with roast sesame seeds, poppy seeds, and seaweed that was made into a powder. This product, which he called Gohan no Tomo (ご飯の友, 'A Friend for Rice'), is generally considered the precursor to contemporary furikake. A food company in Kumamoto later acquired the product and was able to sell it commercially. It was initially sold in a flask-like container shaped with a narrow neck to prevent moisture from seeping into the product.

Another theory is that in 1916, Tanaka Foods developed "Travel Friend"(旅行の友) in cans at the request of the military as a nutritional supplement. This is a blend of dried small fish powder seasoned with soy sauce, sesame, seaweed, and egg.

In 1927, a grocery retailer in Fukushima City named Seiichirō Kai developed a mixture consisting of ishimochi (石持 or 石首魚, silver white croaker, Pennahia argentata) with soy sauce seasoning, kelp, and sesame seeds. He founded the Marumiya Food Research Institute. Kai called his product Kore Wa Umai (これは旨い, 'This Is Tasty'); it was popular on its release. Although Kore Wa Umai was initially considered a luxury item for the affluent who were able to consume white rice on a regular basis, it later was made accessible to the Japanese working class.

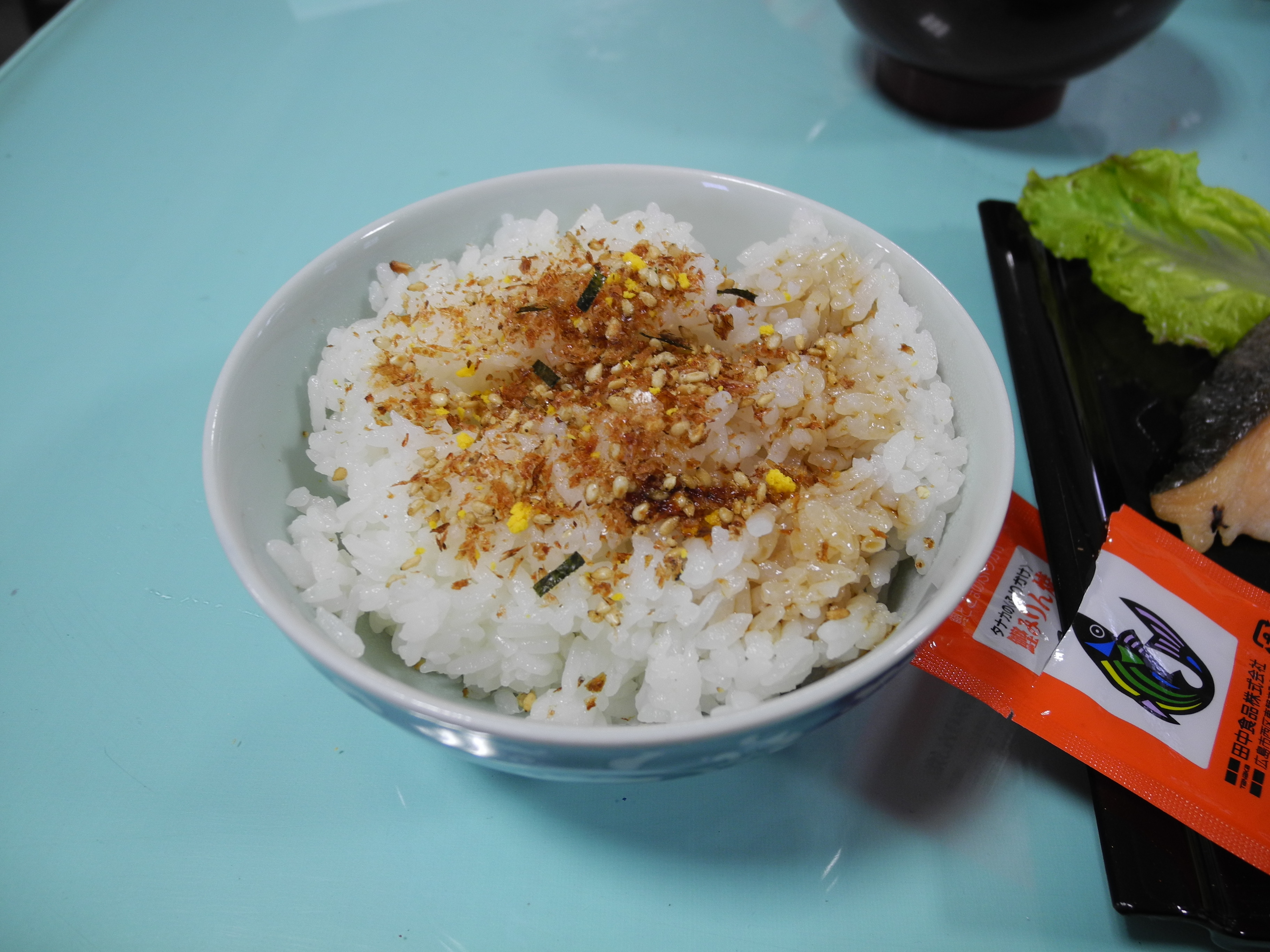
On rice

The availability of furikake in Japan increased starting shortly after September 1948, when Nissin Foods began to manufacture it on a large scale to address pervasive malnourishment. The product was commercialized on the basis that it provided a good source of protein and calcium. Furikake was made widely available as it was dispensed to those serving in the Japanese military starting in World War I.

The term furikake was used generically to describe the product starting in 1959 with the formation of the National Furikake Association. Since 1959, furikake products are usually differentiated by their particular ingredients, such as salmon furikake and sesame-and-salt furikake.

In the same year, Marumiya Foods developed "Noritama," a sweetened egg added to Kore Wa Umai which became popular as furikake for children. In 1963, Noritama with a sticker of 8 Man became explosively popular, and furikake was transformed from a luxury food for adults to a popular food for children.

In 1970, Mishima Shokuhin marketed a new furikake, made by reusing the red shiso used to color pickled plums, under the product name Yukari. The name comes from the desire to create a connection ("縁" (yukari) in Japanese) with customers.

In the 1980s, furikake became strongly associated with children's food, and its use rapidly declined after the age of 12. In 1989, Nagatanien began selling "furikake for adults" using ingredients with a luxurious taste and pungent flavor. The initial varieties were "Salmon," "Bonito," and "Wasabi."

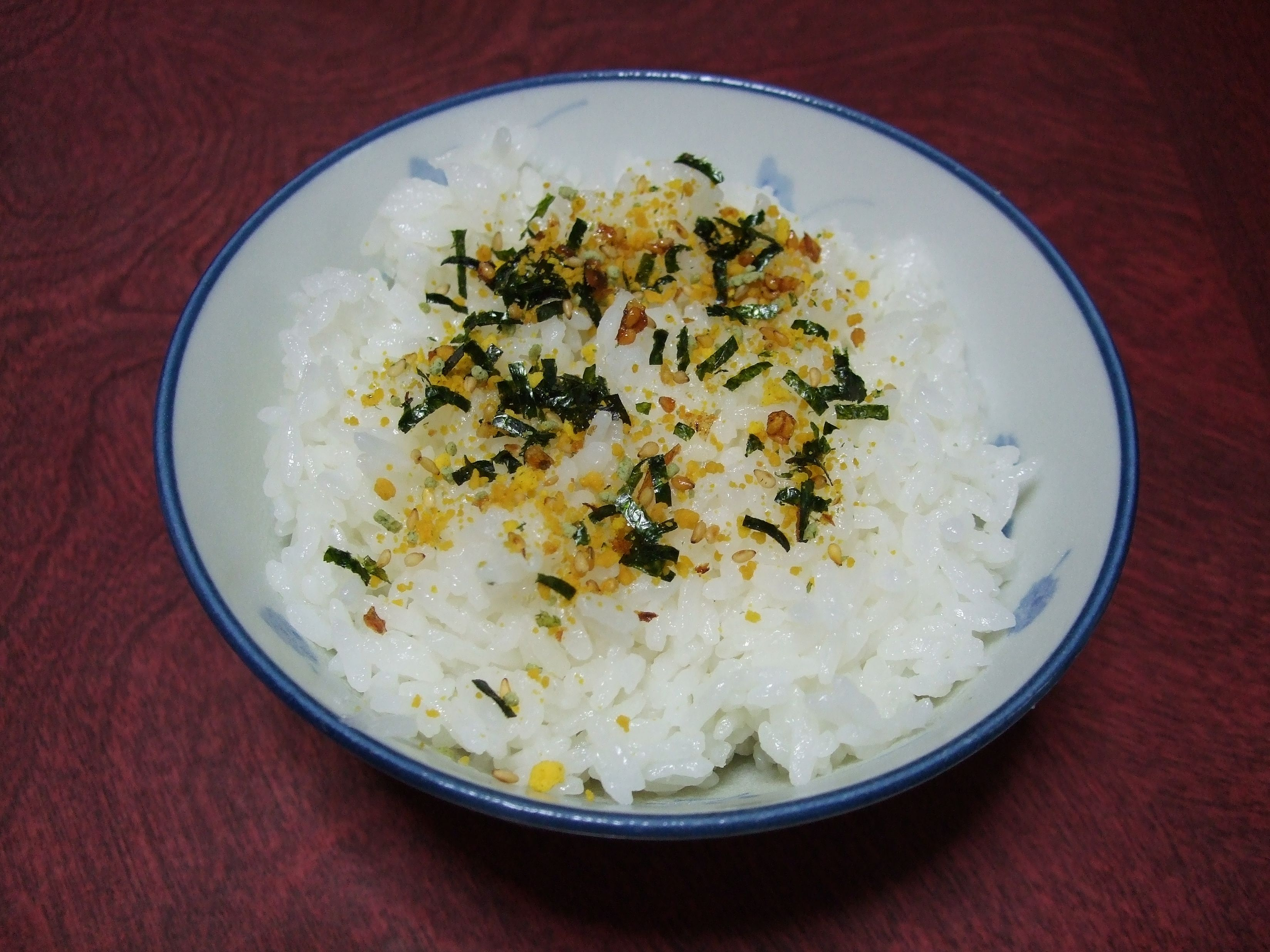
Noritama on rice

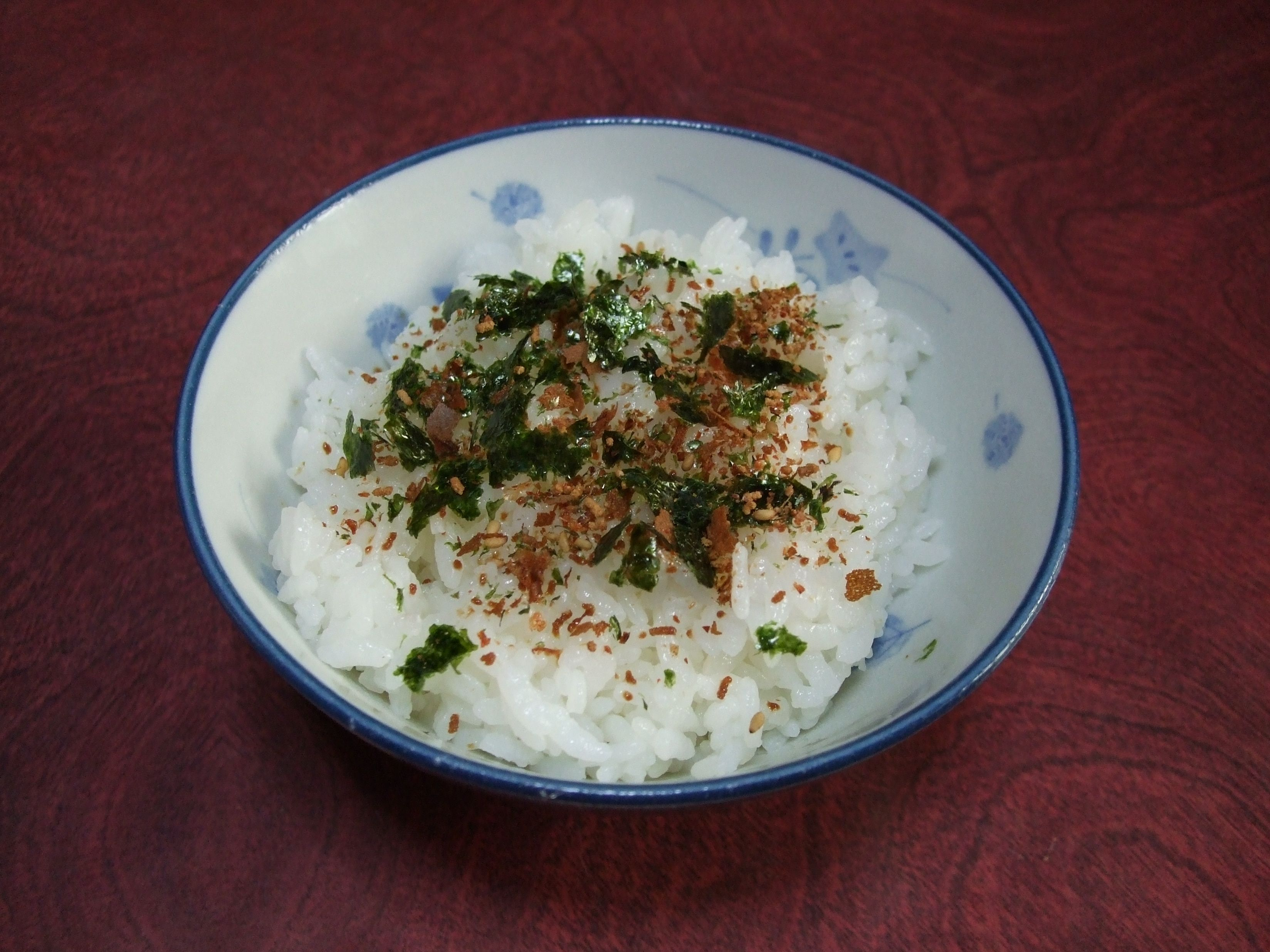
Furikake for Adult on rice

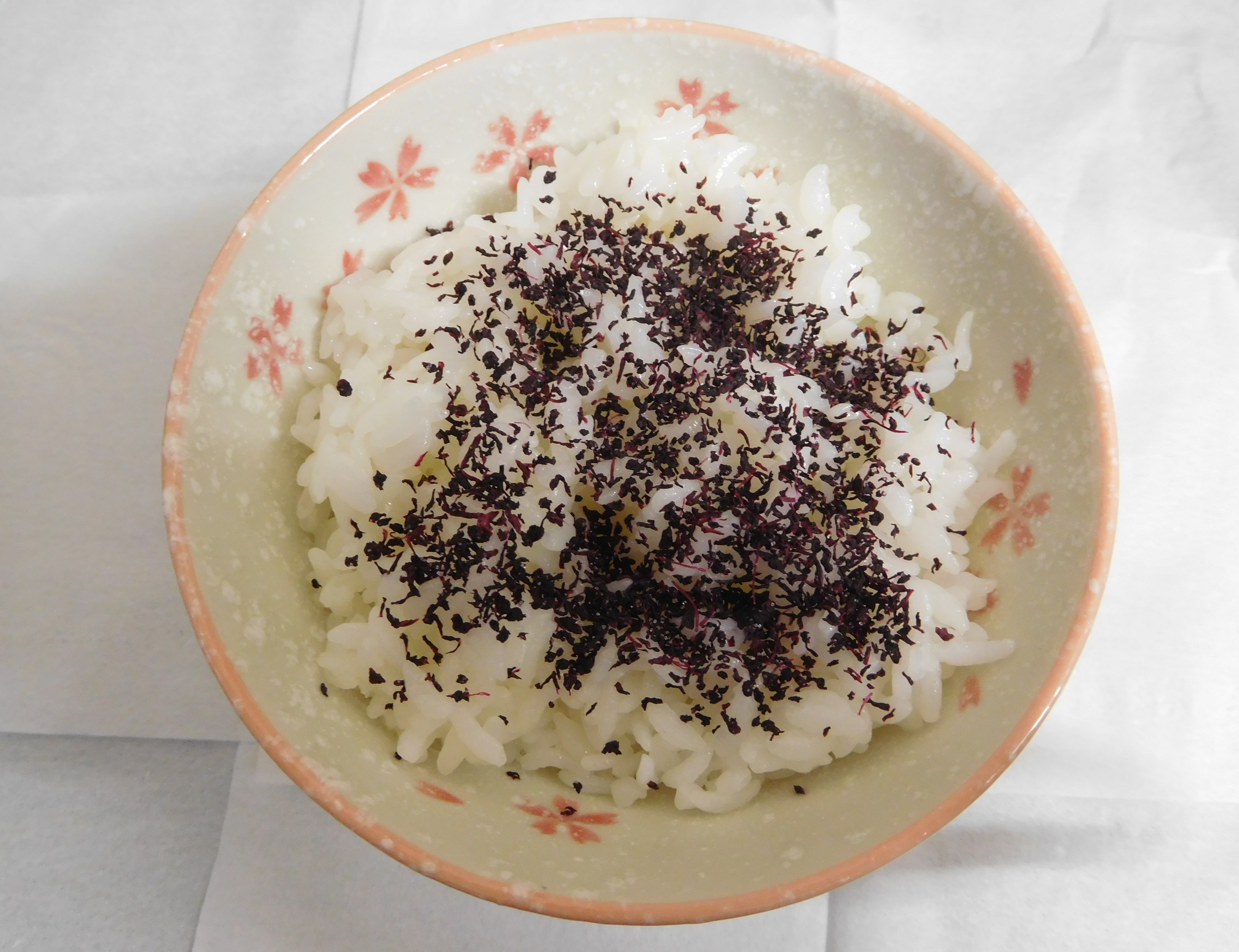
Yukari (shiso salt) on rice

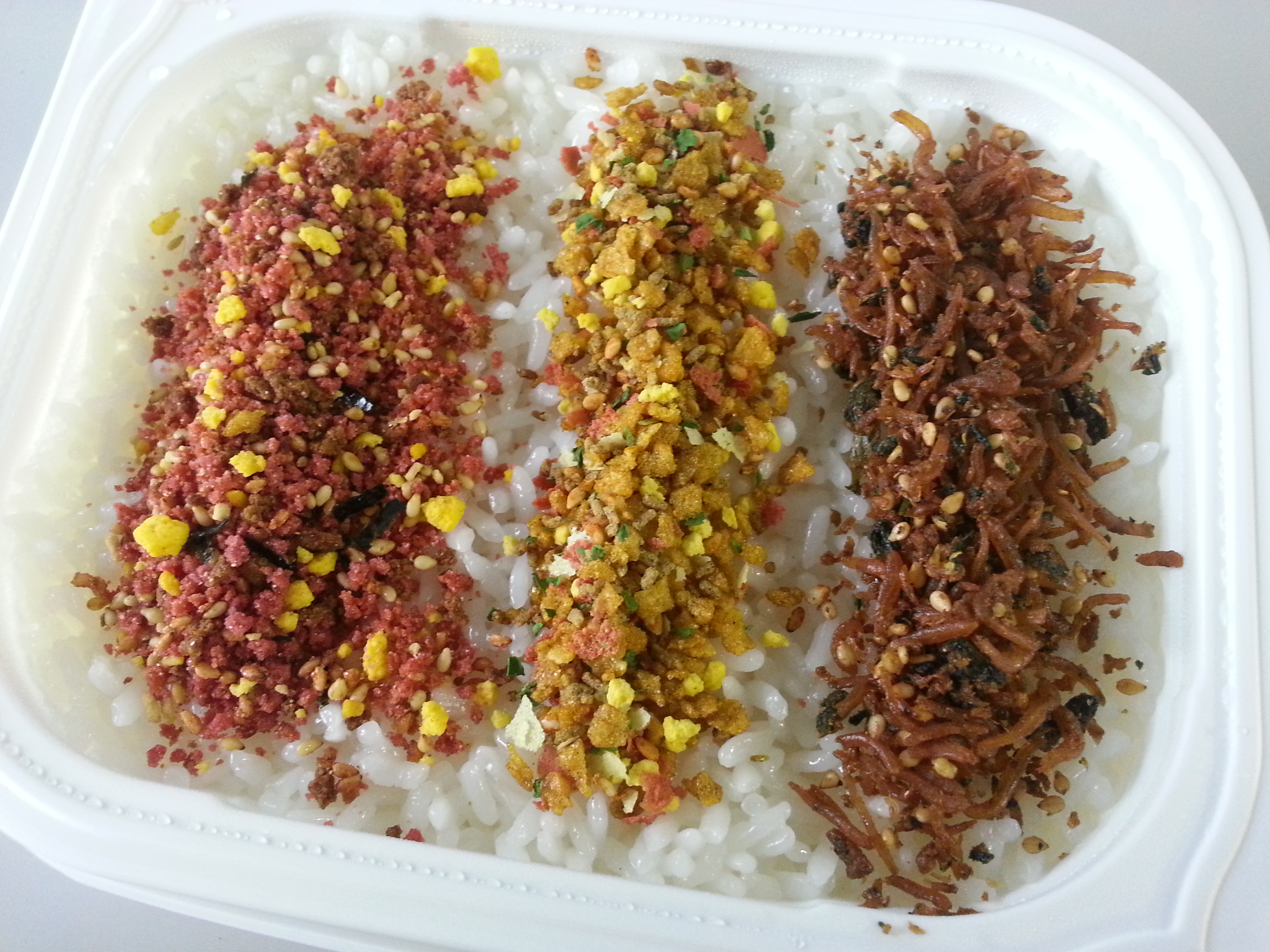
Three types of furikake

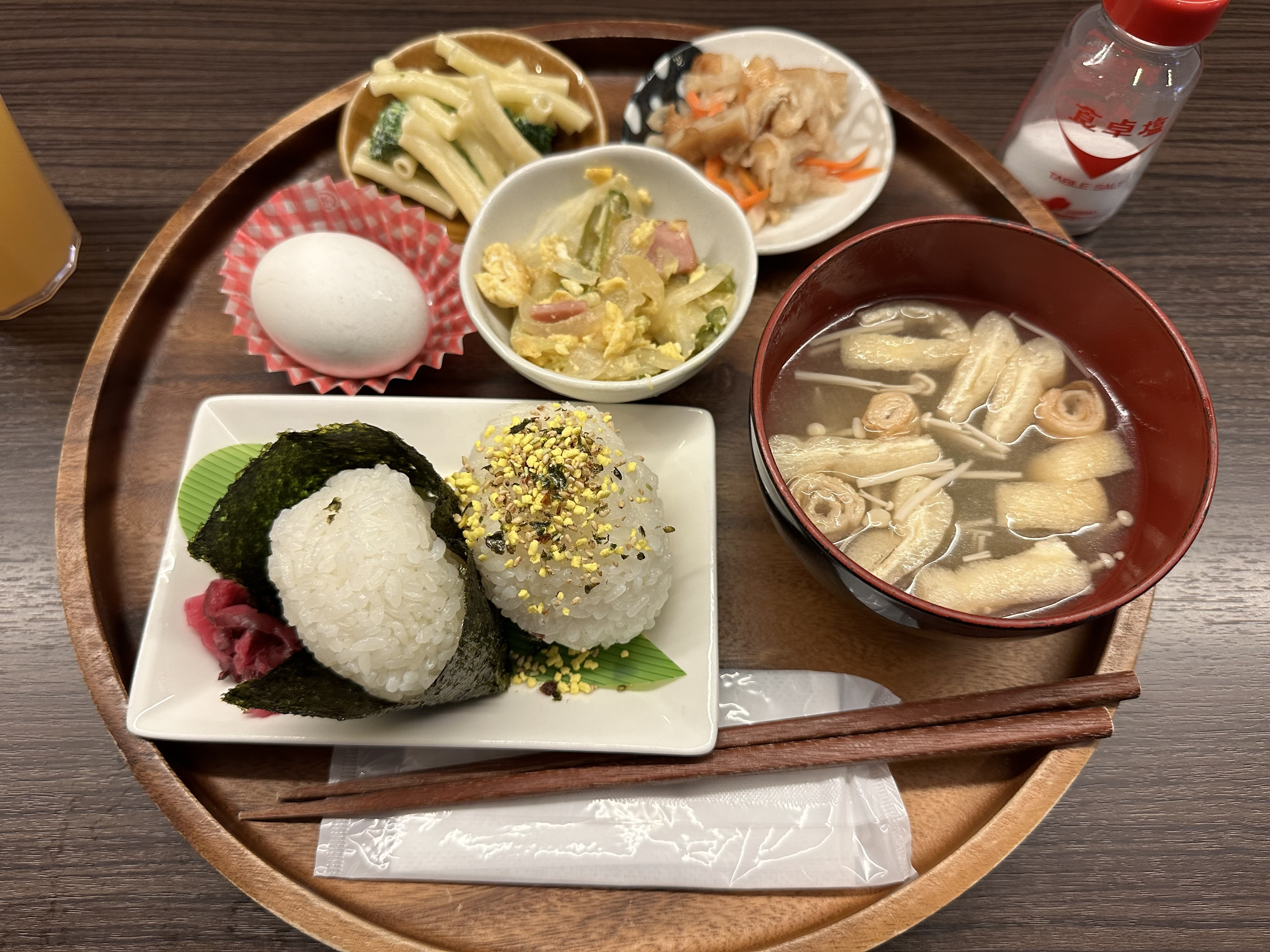
On onigiri

== Manufacturers ==
Share by Furikake Maker (Aug.2017 to Sep.2018)
1. Marumiya (45.0%)
2. Nagatanien (13.0%)
3. Mishima Shokuhin (8.00%)
4. Tanaka Shokuhin (5.00%)
5. Oomoriya (5.00%)
6. Other (24.0%)

Marumiya has been selling furikake since 1927, and according to a 2021 The Nikkei survey, 11 of its products are among the top 20 value share about products in large bags. The product names include "Noritama", "Ajidoraku", "Soft Furikake", "Sukiyaki", and "Honkatsuo."

Nagatanien sells furikake that is divided into individual servings. Its main products are "Furikake for Adult", "Furikake for Adult Mini", and "Anpanman Furikake." However, Nagatanien's market share is far behind that of Marumiya.

Mishima Shokuhin's furikake products include "Yukari" and "Umeko," and four of the aforementioned top 20 products in large bags are "Yukari" and one is "Umeko.

== See also ==
- Gomashio – a type of furikake mostly consisting of cooked black sesame seeds and sea salt crystals
- Ochazuke – a soup made by sprinkling seasonings (such as furikake) and toppings over cooked rice, then covering with brewed green tea
- Shichimi – a chilli-based spice mixture similar to furikake mainly used on noodles, soups and gyūdon
- List of sesame seed dishes
- Chutney
