= Magna Kubo =

Defunct Filipino restaurant in Beaverton, Oregon, U.S.

- Interactive map of Magna Kubo

Restaurant information
- Established: June 2023
- Closed: 2024
- Owner: Carlo Lamagna
- Chef: Kevin Balonso
- Food type: Filipino
- Location: 12406 Southwest Broadway Street, Beaverton, Oregon, 97005, United States
- Coordinates: 45.4873°N 122.8042°W

Magna Kubo was a Filipino restaurant in Beaverton, Oregon. Owner Carlo Lamagna and chef Kevin Balonso opened the restaurant in 2023, as an off-shoot of Lamagna's Portland eatery Magna Kusina. Magna Kubo specialized in rotisserie-style meats and also served bistek, chicken wings, laing, and halo-halo. Despite garnering a positive reception and being named one of the metropolitan area's best new restaurants by The Oregonian, Magna Kubo closed in 2024.

== Description ==
The lechonería Magna Kubo operated at the intersection of Southwest Broadway Street and Southwest Hall Boulevard in Beaverton. Magna Kubo served Filipino cuisine such as rotisserie-style meats (including liempo, or pork belly), rice, and atchara with pickled carrot, onion, and garlic. The menu has also included barbecue ribs, bistek (marinated beef shoulder with star anise and garlic), wagyu beef sliders, laing (coconut milk-braised vegetables with shallots and chiles), fish, chicken wings, and halo-halo.

For Beaverton Restaurant Week in 2023, Magna Kuba collaborated with Hapa Pizza to serve a pizza with shredded pork, Brussels sprouts, mozzarella, red sauce, cilantro, Thai basil, XO sauce and Caesar dressing. For Thanksgiving, a take-out menu included turkey breast marinated in lemongrass and annatto, adobo-braised, crab fat fried rice, sisig-style Brussels sprouts, and gailan with fermented shrimp paste.

== History ==
Magna Kubo opened in June 2023, as a spin-off of the Portland restaurant Magna Kusina. Carlo Lamagna was a co-owner, and Kevin Balonso was the chef. Magna Kubo was among several new Filipino restaurants in the Portland metropolitan area.

In 2024, Magna Kubo participated in Sobrang Sarap, a tour of sixteen Filipino food businesses in the area, and was a vendor at the Oregon AAPI Food and Wine Fest in Dayton, Oregon.

After initially going on a lengthy hiatus, Magna Kubo closed permanently in mid 2024. Lamagna later attributed the closure to issues with staffing and other logistical challenges, including patron parking.

== Reception ==
Magna Kubo ranked ninth in The Oregonian's list of best new restaurants of 2023. The newspaper's Michael Russell called the halo-halo "outrageously good". Katherine Chew Hamilton included the halo-halo in Portland Monthly's overview of the city's ten best dishes of 2023. Krista Garcia included Magna Kubo in Eater Portland's 2024 list of recommended eateries for Filipino food in the metropolitan area. She and Janey Wong also included Magna Kubo in a 2024 list of nineteen Beaverton eateries "making the Portland suburb a dining destination".

== See also ==
- Filipino-American cuisine
- List of Filipino restaurants
