= Bit House Saloon =

Bar and restaurant in Portland, Oregon, U.S.

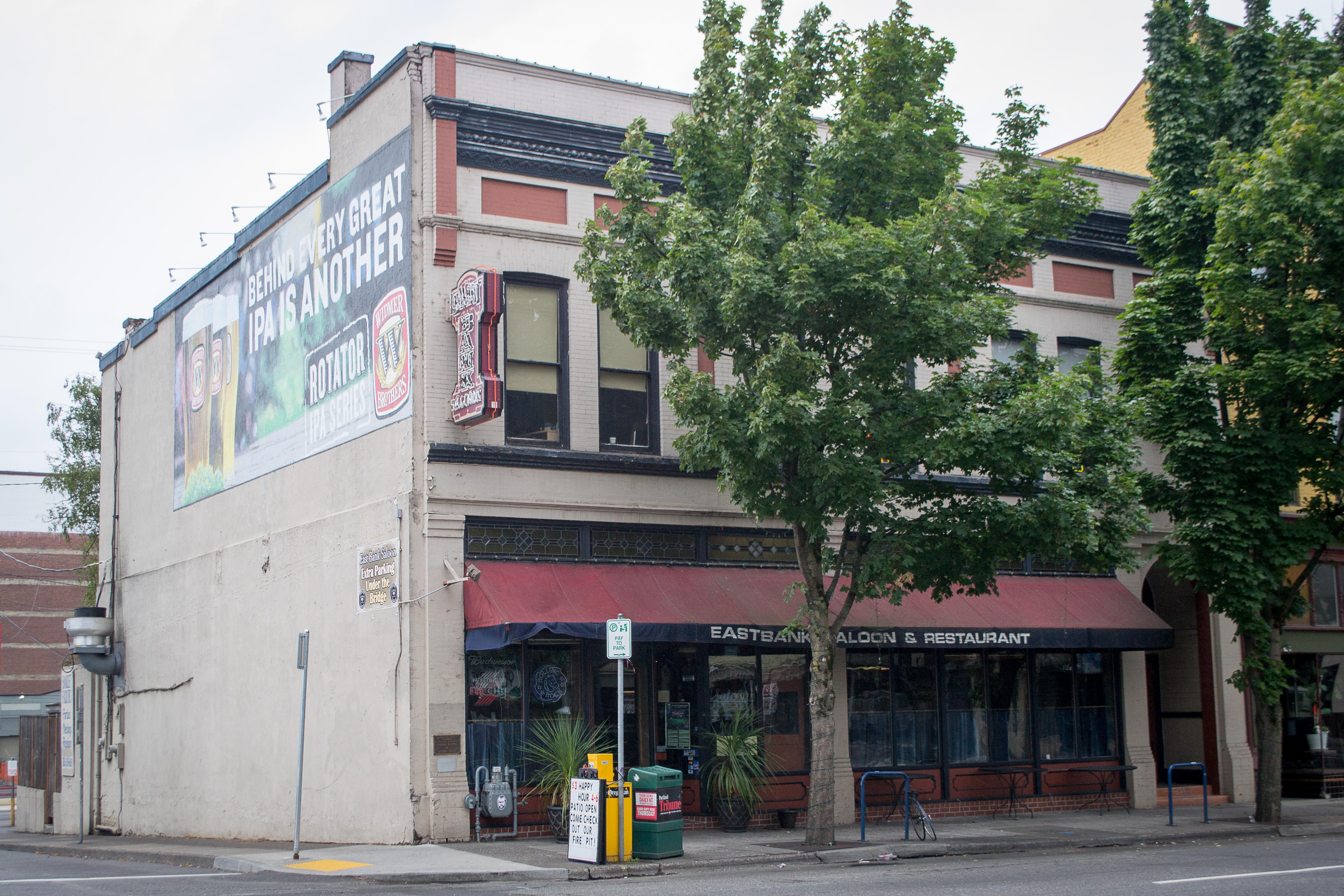
- 2013 photograph of the building which housed Bit House Saloon and Bit House Collective during 2015–2022
- Interactive map of Bit House Saloon

Restaurant information
- Established: July 31, 2015
- Closed: 2022
- Chef: Ricky Bella; Carlo Lamagna
- Location: 727 Southeast Grand Avenue, Portland, Multnomah, Oregon, 97214, United States
- Coordinates: 45.5175°N 122.6610°W

Bit House Saloon was a bar and restaurant in Portland, Oregon, United States. Established in 2015, the business operated in the Nathaniel West Buildings in the city's Buckman neighborhood. The high-energy squad "Team Riff-Raff" managed the bar from 2016 to 2021, hosting pop-ups and inviting other chefs to collaborate.

Bit House garnered a positive reception and was included in several lists of Portland's best bars. The business was named "Portland's 2015 Bar of the Year" by The Oregonian, and was named among Playboy's fifty "Best New Bars 2016". Bit House Saloon rebranded as Bit House Collective in 2021, staying open and serving meals and drinks during the COVID-19 pandemic. The managing partnership shifted to a new bartender and chef, as well as Pono Brewing, featuring "Filipino drinking food".

In June 2021, that management was replaced by Jewan Manuel's pop-up Plant Based Papi, serving vegan entries. By early 2022, the vegan Cuban pop-up restaurant Miami Nice used the space. Bit House Collective also hosted drag brunches before closing in 2022.

== Description ==
Bit House Saloon was housed in an 1896 building constructed by Nathaniel West, part of the National Register of Historic Places-listed Nathaniel West Buildings, in southeast Portland's Buckman neighborhood. Condé Nast Traveler described the bar as "a swanky cocktail lounge, a casual tap house, and a happy-hour destination", with "universal appeal". In Moon Oregon (2020), Judy Jewell and W. C. McRae described the business as a "large and rollicking redbrick bar with a nice patio".

=== Food menu ===
The food menu included a bologna sandwich, Rocky Mountain oysters, and biscuits. It was later changed to include crunchwraps, tacos, and tamales. The restaurant also served chicken wings with jalapeño, serrano, fresno and ancho chilies with onion, garlic, vinegar and butter. Bit House's brunch menu, launched in 2018, included "a melange of breakfast classics with a hint of Latin American flavors", such as horchata French toast, roasted poblano hash, a McMuffin-like breakfast sandwich with chorizo, and a frozen blackberry margarita.

=== Drinks ===
Cocktails included the Ace of Spades (whiskey) and the Sloe Gin Fizz 3000 (gin, cinnamon, lemon, egg white, and a sodium bicarbonate cube). The Wexter's Playground has been described as a "tiki and comic book-inspired behemoth ... starring a dinosaur, powdered sugar, and single-barrel brandy from Germain Robin". The drink included Orchard Pear liqueur, Pedro Ximenez Sherry, lime, Blackstrap bitters, and salted almond, and was garnished with a toy dinosaur, mint, and apple slices. The Boom Swagger Swagger had Cruzan Black Strap Rum, falernum, Dry Curaçao, and Stumptown cold brew nitro draft.

The K23 had rum, jasmine, mint, lemon, and beet, and the House of Bambooze had sherry, vermouth, and salted almonds. The Breakfast with Paula Deen had coffee, cherry-washed bourbon, pecan milk, and "toffee-rich chantilly French cream liqueur". One version of a boilermaker paired Angel's Envy Rye with Scrimshaw Pilsner, from North Coast Brewing Company. The restaurant also served single-barrel bourbons on tap.

Bit House Collective had a drink called the Padam, Pandan, Pandan O.F. with vodka, bourbon, pandan, blueberry, galangal root and bitters.

== History ==
=== Bit House Saloon ===
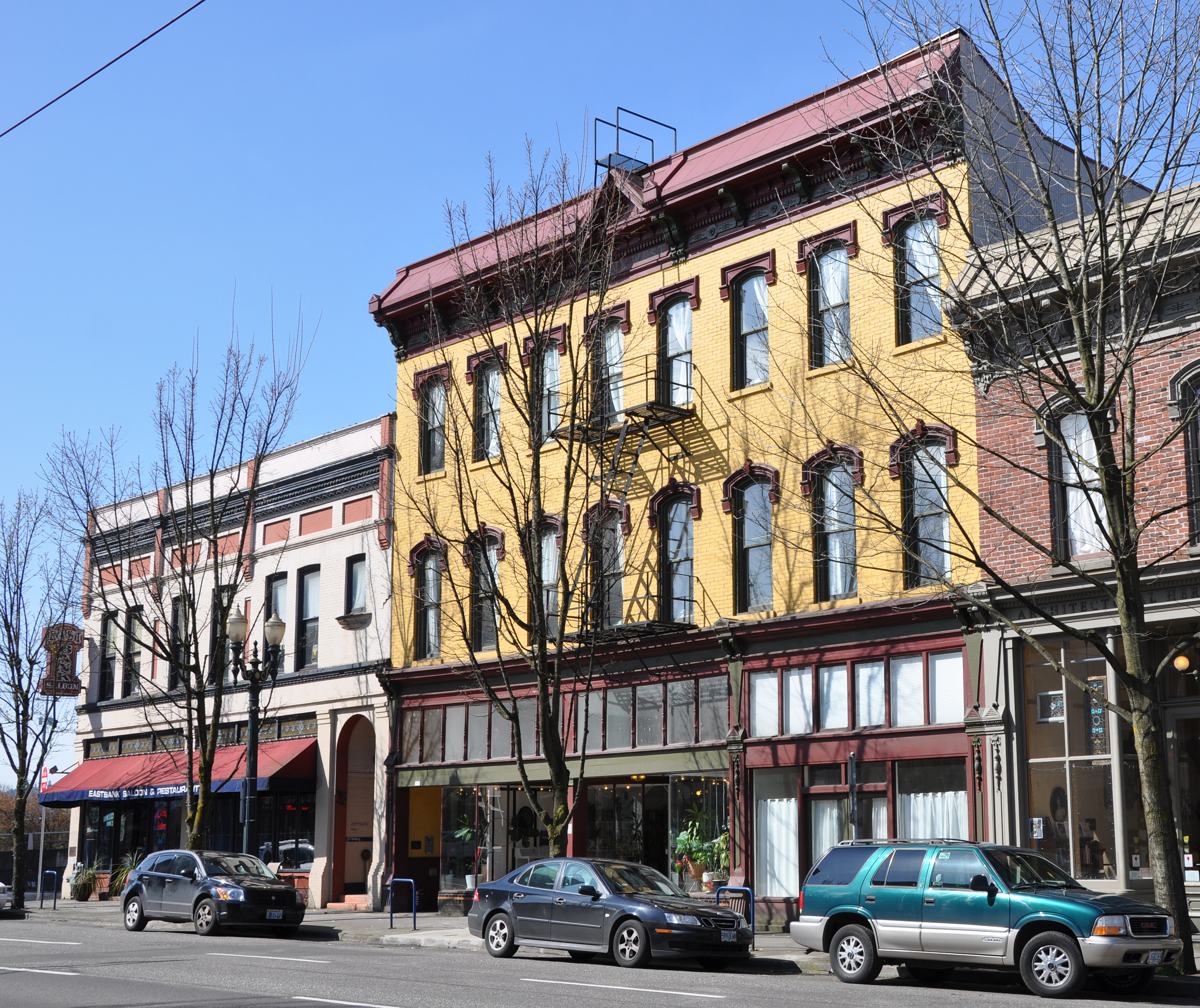
Bit House Saloon was housed in one of the Nathaniel West Buildings (pictured in 2012), which are listed on the National Register of Historic Places.

"Bit House" is a colloquial term for a cheap saloon. The 150-seat Bit House Saloon opened on July 31, 2015, in a space previously occupied for more than three decades by East Bank Saloon. Elk Collective oversaw the remodel prior to opening. Days after opening, shelves behind the bar displaying "rare, hard-to-find and almost-impossible-to-replace imported and Japanese whiskeys" collapsed.

Bit House Saloon was named among Playboy's fifty "Best New Bars 2016". The review began, "Five of Oregon's best bar managers walk into a bar. And they don't leave! Instead, they form Team Riff Raff, the high-energy squad behind Portland's Bit House Saloon." Team Riff Raff members included Jesse Card, Chris Churilla, Nick Cifuni, Brian Gilbert, and Chauncey Roach. Card left in 2017.

Ricky Bella became chef in 2017. In 2022, Brooke Jackson-Glidden of Eater Portland wrote, "To bring people into the bar on slow nights, Bella began hosting pop-ups, collaborating with chefs and line cooks from around town; people like Top Chef and fellow Imperial alumnus Doug Adams would step into the kitchen at Bit House. He remembers one particular Cinco de Mayo with other Mexican American chefs; they set up a trompo outside the bar, made with a side of pork."

Bit House hosted The Cockpit, an event described by Willamette Week as a "recurring deep house club staple", as of 2017. Vektroid unveiled a "video mixtape" at the restaurant in 2018.

=== Transition to Bit House Collective and closure ===
Logo for Bit House Collective

In 2021, Bit House Saloon was rebranded as Bit House Collective, with a changed managing partnership that included bartender Natasha Mesa, chef Carlo Lamagna of the restaurant Magna, and local brewery Pono Brewing. Characterizing it as a "long-term takeover of Bit House", Pono Brewing said that "the island influence" of its beers would pair well with "Magna's food and Natasha's cocktails". Bit House Collective began operating on March 3.

Andrea Damewood of Willamette Week noted how the business was intentional during the COVID-19 pandemic, when many restaurants operated via take-out. She recommended the waffle fries and lumpia and said Mesa's cocktails were "clearly designed to complement" Lamagna's "Filipino drinking food, which state law insists you must order along with any cocktail to go".

In June 2021, the Magna team left to open Magna Kusina and was replaced by Jewan Manuel's pop-up Plant Based Papi. For three months, Manuel served vegan tacos, pastas, and other comfort foods five days a week. Plant Based Papi also served birria tacos, jalapeño mac and cheese, fried "chicken" sandwiches, and a birria burrito.

The vegan Cuban pop-up restaurant Miami Nice used the space in early 2022. Miami Nice served "Flantastic flan", described as "a light, custard-y dessert soaked in caramel syrup", as well as "a selection of shots, non-alcoholic cocktails, and frozen drinks with a vegan Cubanito, a sandwich featuring slow-roasted jackfruit marinated in a citrus mojo". Elizabeth Delgado and Chandler Petersen included Miami Nice in Eater Portland's 2022 overview of "where to find exceptional Cuban food in Portland and beyond", during the pop-up's tenure at Bit House.

Bit House hosted a Great Gatsby-themed party for the 2021 New Year's Eve. In March 2022, Bit House Collective began hosting Fever Dream, a monthly dance event series prioritizing LGBTQ+ DJs of color. The event had "emcees, turntables, garish lights, and go-go dancers" and was staffed entirely by BIPOC individuals. Bit House also hosted drag brunches in June (Pride Month) in 2021 and 2022. In 2022, Bit House Collective closed and Swan Dive took over the space.

== Reception ==
The Oregonian named Bit House Saloon "Portland's 2015 Bar of the Year". Playboy's review said that the "old-timey feel is dialed up to 11 at Bit House, where the floors are made from old bourbon barrels, the bar is built from Oregon wine barrel staves and the room is dotted with leather armchairs and brass light fixtures. The cocktail menu has bold cocktails alongside precious ones." In his 2016 review of the bar, Willamette Week contributor Matthew Korfhage wrote:

Bit House is a bit like a circus for bar people ... The crowd, meanwhile, is like a shotgun blasted into a census report—bar service pros, French tourists, old dudes, suburbanites, posh youth, you name it ... I literally never know what to expect in here, but there's always something new, and the eavesdropping at the back fire pit is some of my favorite in town.

Bit House was a runner-up in the Best New Bar category of Willamette Week's annual Best of Portland readers' poll in 2016. The business received the editor's choice award for "Bar of the Year" from Mattie John Bamman of Eater Portland, as part of Eater Awards 2016. In 2017, Bamman wrote, "Bit House Saloon offers perhaps the most comprehensive drink offerings in the city, from its in-house, single-barrel-spirits program, to well-priced, thoughtfully sourced boilermakers. Its creative cocktails even warrant hiring a full-time employee focused exclusively on bar prep."

Thoms Ross of the Portland Mercury wrote in 2017:

The pages-long cocktail menu at Bit House includes classics, blendies, swizzles, toddies, and even draft cocktails, yet what Bit House seems to specialize in is the novelty cocktail. It's not unlikely that you'll see a smoke gun behind the bar, or a sous-vide machine, or a contingent of Campari gummy bears. From an 'umami bomb' black-sesame-orgeat cocktail the color of dried lava, to a michelada with ceviche on top, the cocktail menu always features fun—often actually funny—cocktails, and yet they're preposterously delicious.

=== Lists ===
Emmie Martin included Bit House in Business Insider's 2015 list of Portland's 16 "coolest new businesses" and said the establishment was "already making waves in the Portland bar scene". The Oregonian's Michael Russell included Bit House in his 2016 list of the city's 21 "essential" bars. That year, Russell also included the business in his lists of Portland's 23 best patios and 25 "coziest restaurant and bar fireplaces". He also listed it in a 2017 overview of the city's 37 "best restaurant and bar patios".

Thrillist included the business in their 2016 lists of the city's best cocktail bars and the "best bars in Portland right now". The website's "national burger critic" also ranked Bit House eleventh in a 2016 list of the city's best burgers. Eater Portland included Bit House in a 2018 list of 25 happy hours "Portland can't live without" and a 2019 list of the city's 16 "essential" bars. In 2018, The Daily Meal ranked Bit House number 49 in a list of the best bars in the U.S., and Condé Nast Traveler included the business in a list of Portland's thirteen best bars.

== See also ==
- National Register of Historic Places listings in Southeast Portland, Oregon
