= Reverend's BBQ =

Restaurant in Portland, Oregon, U.S.

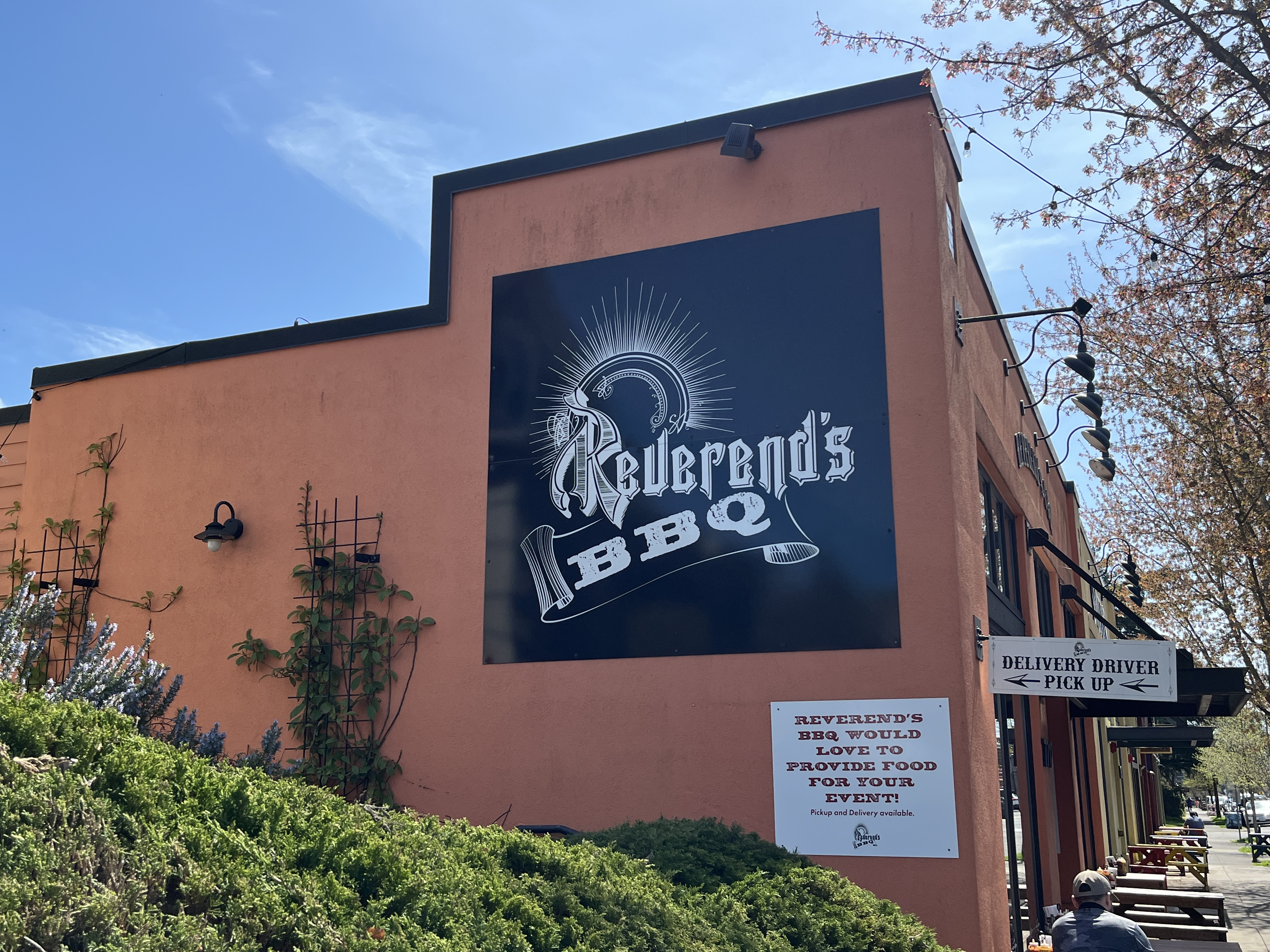
- The restaurant's exterior, 2025
- Interactive map of Reverend's BBQ

Restaurant information
- Established: March 2014; 12 years ago
- Owner: Your Neighborhood Restaurant Group
- Food type: Southern
- Location: 7712 Southeast 13th Avenue, Portland, Multnomah, Oregon, 97202, United States
- Coordinates: 45.4691°N 122.6528°W
- Website: reverendsbbq.com

Reverend's BBQ is a barbecue restaurant in Portland, Oregon, United States. Established in 2014, the eatery is operated by Your Neighborhood Restaurant Group in southeast Portland's Sellwood-Moreland neighborhood. In addition to barbecue, Reverend's serves Southern cuisine such as collards, hushpuppies, macaroni and cheese, potato salad, and banana pudding. The restaurant has garnered a positive reception, especially for its barbecue, burgers, and fried chicken.

== Description ==
The barbecue restaurant Reverend's BBQ operates on 13th Avenue in southeast Portland's Sellwood-Moreland neighborhood. The interior has old advertising signs and multiple televisions.

The menu includes burgers, smoked meats, and Southern sides such as buttermilk-soaked fried chicken, collards, hushpuppies, macaroni and cheese, potato salad, and banana pudding. The restaurant has served pork shoulder, sausage, and tempeh, as well as polenta with creamed corn and tasso ham. The Good Reverend Burger has burnt brisket ends and pimento cheese. The BBQ Chop Salad has brisket ends, cheddar cheese, chow chow, and Ranch dressing. Dessert options include brownie sundaes with hot fudge, caramel nut bars, and strawberry shortcake. Cocktails include oyster shooters.

== History ==
Reverend's BBQ is operated by Your Neighborhood Restaurant Group, the restaurant group behind Ate-Oh-Ate and Laurelhurst Market, among other eateries. Reverend's has been described as a "sister restaurant" of both Ate-Oh-Ate and Laurelhurst Market, and as a barbecue and smokehouse "spin-off" of Laurelhurst Market.

In January 2014, Michael Russell of The Oregonian said Reverend's "has already emerged as one of Portland's most-anticipated spring restaurant openings of the year". The restaurant opened in March 2014.

For the Portland Mercury-organized food event Portland Wing Week in 2019, Reverend's served chicken wings that were brined, rubbed with jerk spice, smoked, and fried with a pineapple BBQ sauce, inspired by Steve Martin's character in the comedy film The Jerk (1979). Reverend's has also participated in the Mercury's Highball and Nacho Week events.

== Reception ==
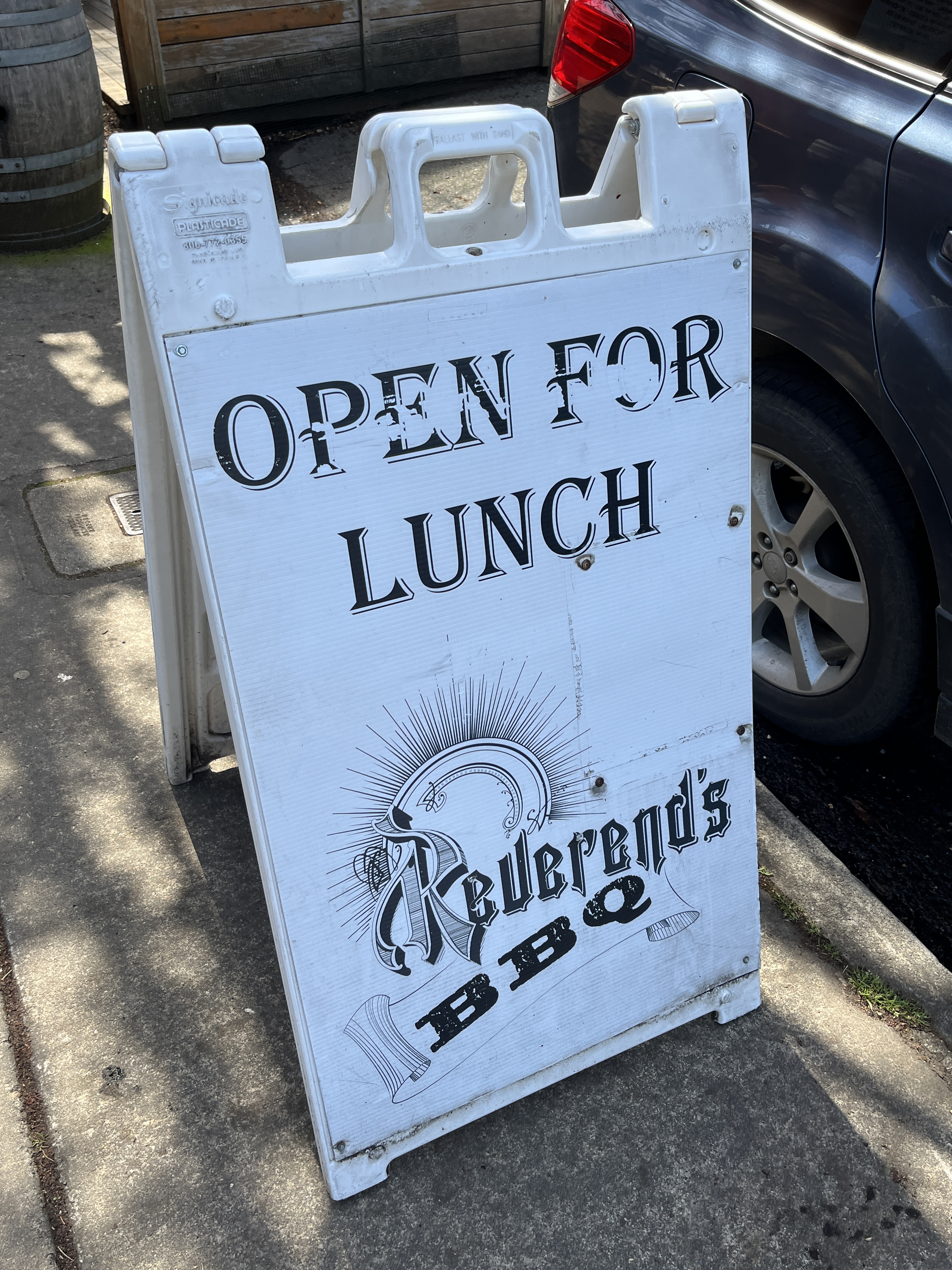
Sign

Drew Tyson included the Good Reverend Burger in Thrillist's list of Portland's eight best new burgers of 2014. The website's Liz Childers included the burger in a similar list of the city's fifteen best new burgers of 2014. Thrillist called Reverend's "one of the best-kept smoker secrets in Portland" in 2016. The Good Reverend Burger was selected for Oregon in Yahoo Travel's 2016 list of the "most over-the-top" hamburgers in each U.S. state. The Oregonian's Michael Russell ranked Reverend's sixth in a 2017 list of Portland's ten best barbecue restaurants.

Lakshmi Sadhu included Reverend's in the Daily Hive's 2019 list of Portland's seven "most mouthwatering" fried chicken restaurants. In 2019, Willamette Week recommended the restaurant for inexpensive dining in southeast Portland and said, "Reverend's BBQ is exactly what the mind's eye conjures when you imagine a family-style barbecue joint in Portland. The sandwiches are a perfect jumping-off point to gradually move your way through all that Reverend's has to offer, with the barbecue beef brisket ... being the most sterling representation of its wares." The business was a runner-up in the Best Barbecue category of Willamette Week's annual 'Best of Portland' readers' poll in 2024.

Reverend's was included in Eater Portland's 2020 list of fourteen "outstanding" fried chicken sandwiches in the city, 2023 overview of recommended eateries in Sellwood-Moreland, and 2024 list of eight "standout" restaurants in the Portland metropolitan area. Ron Scott also included the business in the website's 2025 overview of the best barbecue eateries in Portland.

== See also ==
- Barbecue in the United States
- List of barbecue restaurants
