= Kau Kau =

Hawaiian restaurant in Portland, Oregon, U.S.

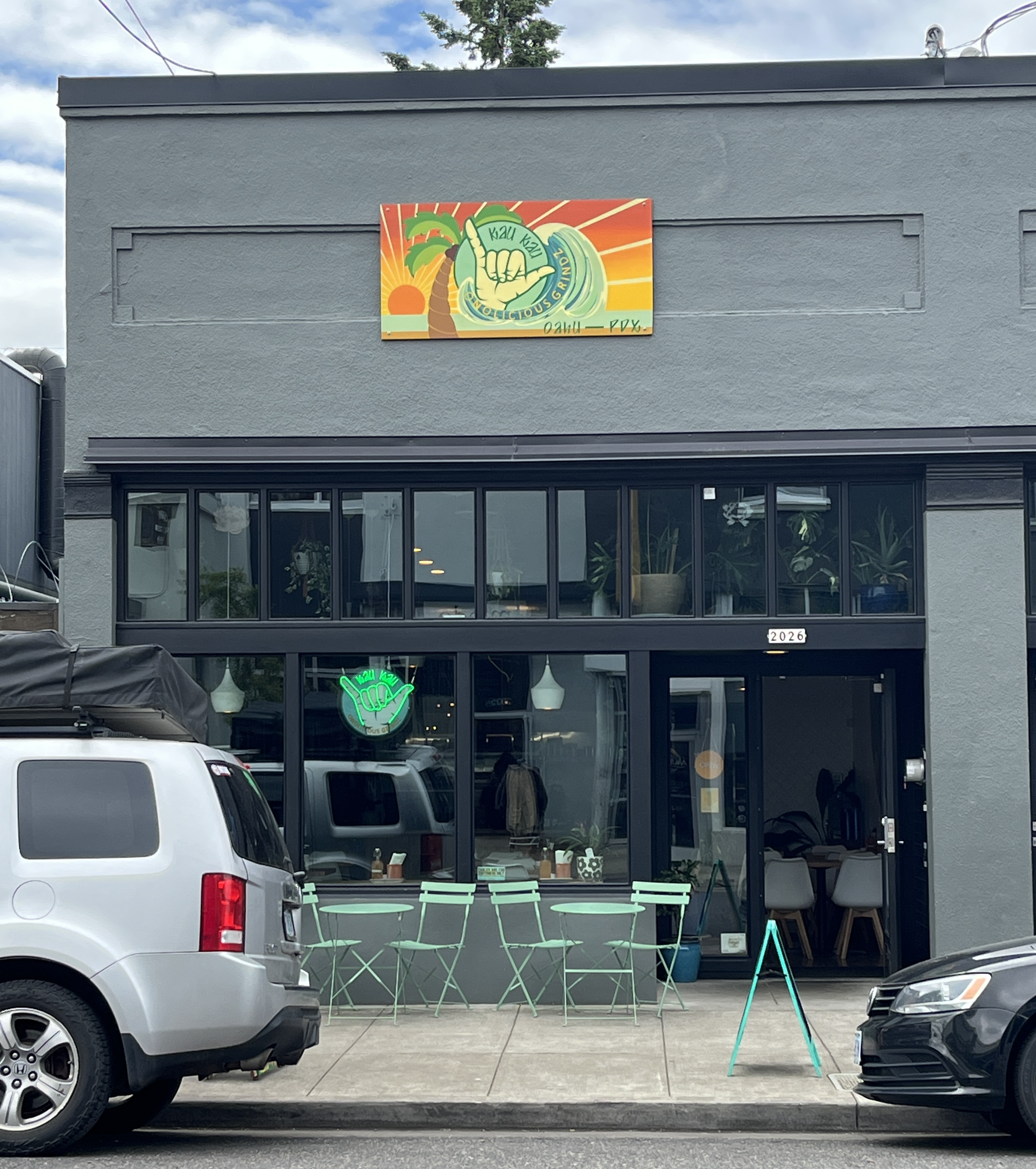
- The restaurant's exterior, 2025
- Interactive map of Kau Kau

Restaurant information
- Established: 2021
- Owners: Brandon and Tracee Hirahara
- Food type: Hawaiian
- Location: 2026 Northeast Alberta Street, Portland, Multnomah, Oregon, 97211, United States
- Coordinates: 45.5589°N 122.6443°W
- Website: kaukaupdx.com

Kau Kau is a Hawaiian restaurant in Portland, Oregon, United States. Chefs and spouses Brandon and Tracee Hirahara started the business as a pop-up restaurant at Little Griddle in 2021. The restaurant relocated to a brick and mortar space in northeast Portland's Vernon neighborhood in 2025.

== Description ==
The Asian American Pacific Islander (AAPI)-owned Hawaiian restaurant Kau Kau, which means "to eat” in Hawaiian Pidgin, operates on Alberta Street in northeast Portland's Vernon neighborhood. Portland Monthly said, "Hawaiian radio pop thumps through the speakers, like what you might hear on a drive around the islands... The vibe here is incredibly laid-back, almost disarming, no white tablecloths or fussiness whatsoever." Kau Kau has an outdoor patio.

The menu has included chicken long rice, kombu maki, lomi-lomi salmon, mochiko chicken, poke bowls, Spam musubi, and squid luau, as well as sides like macaroni salad and rice. Butter mochi is a dessert option. The restaurant has also served tempura-battered Oregon smelt with scallion-ginger sauce and sesame watercress, as well as beef luau stew with lotus root. The chile pepper water is made in-house. The drink menu also includes Brando's Brews, described by Portland Monthly as "Hawaiian takes on micheladas with li hing mui rims".

== History ==
Chefs and spouses Brandon and Tracee Hirahara launched Kau Kau as a pop-up restaurant at Little Griddle in September 2021. Kau Kau has been a vendor at the Portland Night Market and the Oregon AAPI Food and Wine Fest. In 2023, food from Kau Kau was featured in a wine tasting fundrasier at Korean restaurant Han Oak with proceeds benefitting the Hawaii Community Foundation to aid victims of the 2023 Hawaii wildfires.

In March 2024, the business announced plans to start a dinner residency at Little Griddle in April. In January 2025, Kau Kau's owners announced plans to move into the brick and mortar space on Alberta Street in northeast Portland that previously housed Baba's Mediterranean Grill. The couple had hoped to open in February. The restaurant was slated to open on March 13. The Hiraharas planned to launch dinner service in May 2025. The business participated in Portland's first Fried Chicken Week in 2025.

== Reception ==
Fodor's has included Kau Kau in a list of the fifteen best restaurants in Portland. In 2025, Jordan Michelman of Portland Monthly recommended, "Be generous with the chile pepper water and leave your preconceptions around Hawaiian cuisine where they belong, which is back outside on the street." Alex Frane included the business in Portland Monthly's 2025 list of restaurant opening that defined the city in 2025. The Oregonian's Michael Russell included Kau Kau in a 2025 list of Portland's ten best new restaurants. He also included the chicken katsu curry in The Oregonian's list of Portland's 25 best dishes of 2025.

== See also ==
- List of Hawaiian restaurants
