= Nathaniel West Buildings =

Historic buildings in Portland, Oregon, U.S.

- U.S. National Register of Historic Places
- U.S. Historic district – Contributing property
- Portland Historic Landmark
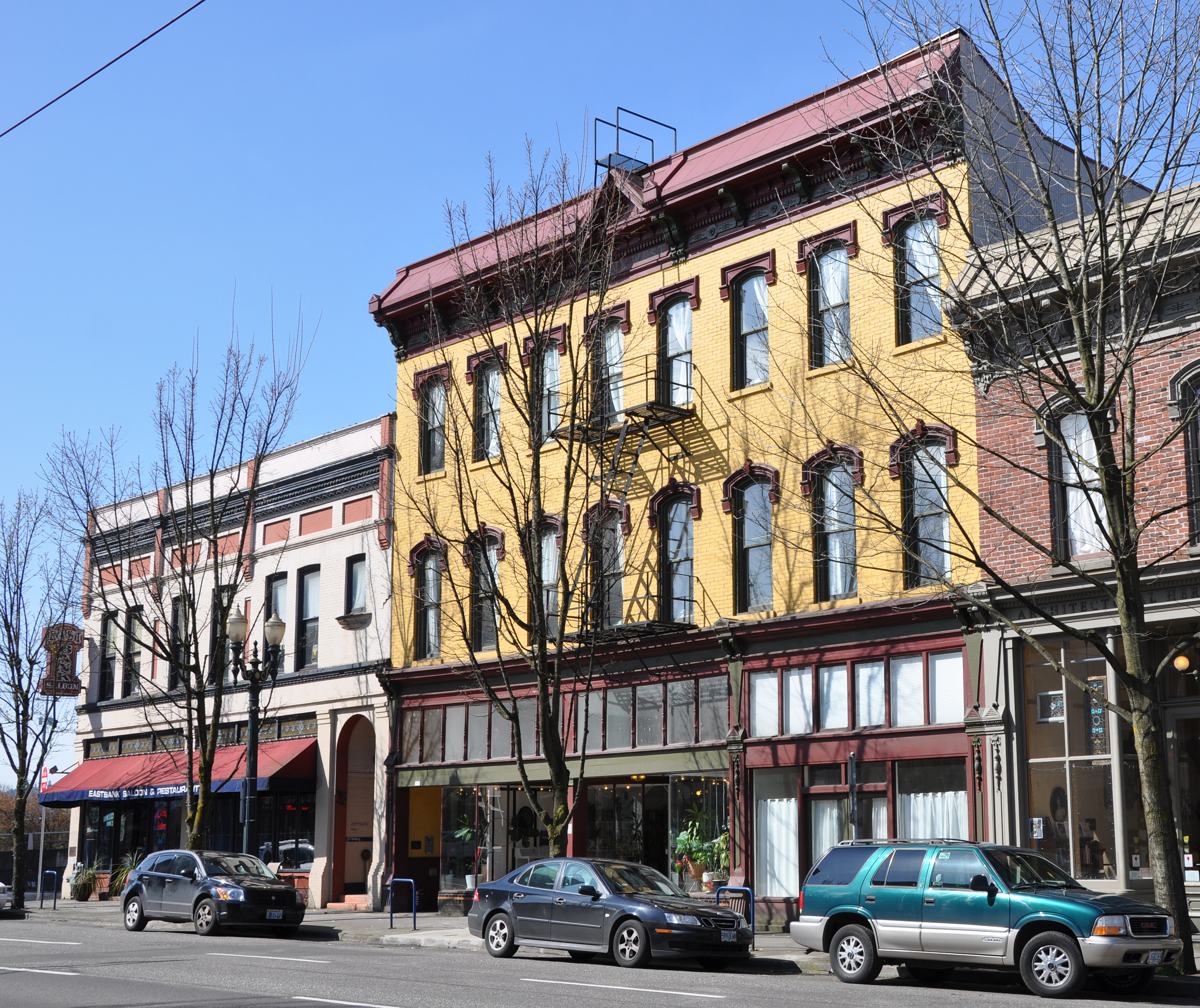
- The buildings' exterior in 2012

- Location within Portland, Oregon Location within Oregon Location within the United States
- Location: 711–727 SE Grand Avenue; Portland, Oregon
- Coordinates: 45°31′03″N 122°39′40″W
- Area: less than 1 acre (0.40 ha)
- Built: 1892 (right) and 1896 (left)
- Architectural style: Italianate (right); Streetcar Era Commercial (left)
- Part of: East Portland Grand Avenue Historic District (ID91000126)
- NRHP reference No.: 84003095
- Added to NRHP: April 26, 1984

The Nathaniel West Buildings in southeast Portland, Oregon, United States, are listed on the National Register of Historic Places. The two structures are part of a group of three, including West's Block, built by West in the late 19th century.

== Description ==
Built in 1892, the brick structure at 711–19 Southeast Grand Avenue, in the middle of the block, is Italianate in style. Its cornice roof resembles that of its neighbor, West's Block, at 701–07 S.E. Grand Ave., also on the National Register. Features of the 51-by-65-foot (16 by 20 m) building include two sets of eight double-hung sash windows with arched frames, one set per floor. The interior of the building has been subdivided for commercial space and offices.

More modest than the 1892 structure, the brick building at 721–27 S.E. Grand Ave. was constructed in 1896 in a Streetcar Era Commercial style. Notable features of the 60-by-51-foot (18 by 16 m) structure are pilasters that divide the main floor into three bays; double-hung sash windows on the second floor; recessed horizontal panels over each bay, and a modest cornice.

== History ==
Nathaniel West (1826–97) emigrated with his wife and four children from New York to Oregon in 1875. Settling in East Portland a year later, West bought and sold property to raise capital and in 1883 built the West's Block building. Here the West family opened a dry goods and clothing store and lived in an upstairs apartment. Over the next decade, the family constructed several other buildings in the block.

The original Morrison Bridge, near the West's Block and championed by West when he was president of the East Portland City Council, opened in 1887. Running east–west over the Willamette River, it connected East Portland to downtown Portland. By 1900, more than half of the Portland-area population lived on the east side of the river, and Grand Avenue was the main north–south street along the east bank. In 1936, work on the bridge approaches led to demolition of the West buildings except the three along the avenue.

Since their construction, the West structures have served many purposes. Original uses included retail stores, a Post Office station, a drug store, and private housing. A shoe and boot store, an electric company, an oyster house, a boxing gymnasium, a sound-system company, and a saloon were among the businesses that later used the properties. The Architectural Heritage Center, a non-profit focused on historic preservation, occupies the West's Block building, at 701 S.E. Grand Ave.

The interior of 727 SE Grand was remodeled to accommodate the East Bank Saloon, with antique furniture and East Portland photographs on the main floor and a banquet room on the second floor. Bit House Saloon opened at 727 SE Grand in 2015. In 2021, the bar closed and was rebranded as Bit House Collective.

== See also ==
- National Register of Historic Places listings in Southeast Portland, Oregon
