= Carne frita =

Carne frita is Spanish for "fried meat." It can also refer to:

- Bistek, also known as carne frita in the Western Visayas islands, a Filipino dish of beef sirloin or tenderloin braised in onions, soy sauce, garlic, sugar, and citrus juices
- Milanesa, also known as carne frita in the Philippines, beef sirloin pounded into thin strips, breaded, and fried
