= Zippy's =

Hawaiian fast casual restaurant chain

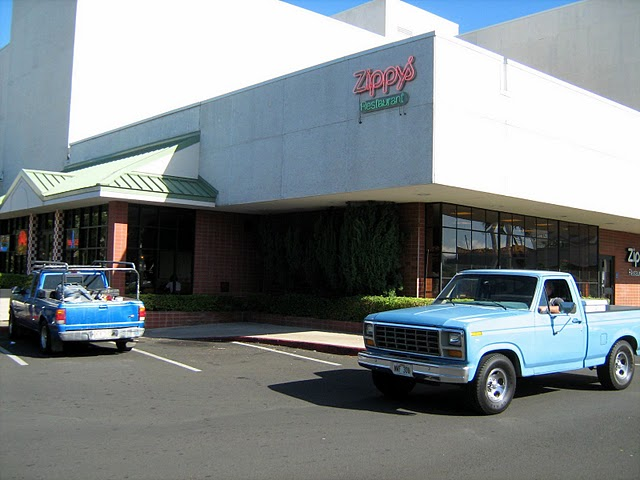
- Industry: Restaurant
- Founded: October 17, 1966; 58 years ago
- Founder: Francis and Charles Higa
- Headquarters: 1765 South King Street, Honolulu, Hawaii
- Number of locations: 23
- Website: www.zippys.com

Zippy's is a fast casual restaurant chain based in Hawaii. It has 23 locations and serves American, Japanese, Chinese, and Hawaiian fusion food. One of their best-selling items is chili. Zippy's can be found on O'ahu, Maui, Hawai'i, and in Las Vegas, Nevada.

== History ==
On October 17, 1966, brothers Francis and Charles Higa opened the first Zippy's on South King Street in Honolulu, Hawaii. At first, the Higa brothers were going to open a car wash, but they ended up creating a restaurant. The kitchen was located in the back of the Zippy's McCully fast food operation. At the time, the zip code was gaining popularity because it was a faster and more efficient way for mail to arrive. The Higa brothers liked the idea of zip codes and they wanted their restaurant to have the same kind of service, so they named the restaurant Zippy's. Francis and Charlie bought mostly freestanding buildings so that they could stay open for 24 hours, attracting many late-night customers.

At the time that Zippy's was first created, a lot of Okinawan mom and pop restaurants were around. There weren't many mainland fast food chains in Hawaii at that time either. At that time, Spencecliff, Andy Wong (Byron's), and Zippy's were the only fast food restaurants around. Because of the competition, the Higa brothers decided on selling a variety of local foods.

On November 19, 1983, Napoleon's Bakery opened its doors, due to the fact that Zippy's wanted to try something different. They wanted to make the restaurant a one-stop shop, so that when the customer were done with their dinner, they could order a dessert. Because of the bakery's opening, the sales at Zippy's increased.

The founders, Francis and Charles Higa, created FCH Enterprise, Inc. in May 2002. Francis and Charles had different personalities and took on different roles to make the business successful. Francis determined the direction of the company, while Charles made most of the operational decisions and handled all food and paper purchases. To this present day, Charles is happily retired and well. However, Francis died on March 25, 1999. Francis' son, Jason Higa, is now the current CEO of FCH Enterprises, Inc.

When Zippy's Kaimuki restaurant opened, Charles would transport huge pots of chili in his station wagon. Now, food is being prepared by Food Solutions International in Waipio and is sent to the different Zippy's around the islands.

On October 10, 2023, Zippy’s officially opened its first location outside of Hawaii in Las Vegas.

== Menu ==
Zippy's is open 24 hours and offers a wide variety of food combining American, Japanese, Korean, Chinese, and Hawaiian cuisine—that is, what people who live in Hawaii call "local" cuisine. Its signature food is their chili. Zippy's sells 110 tons of it every month through their stores, fund raising activities, and in retail markets. Along with their chili, Zippy's sells a variety of plate lunches such as the Zip Pac and the Surf Pac.

== Related chains ==
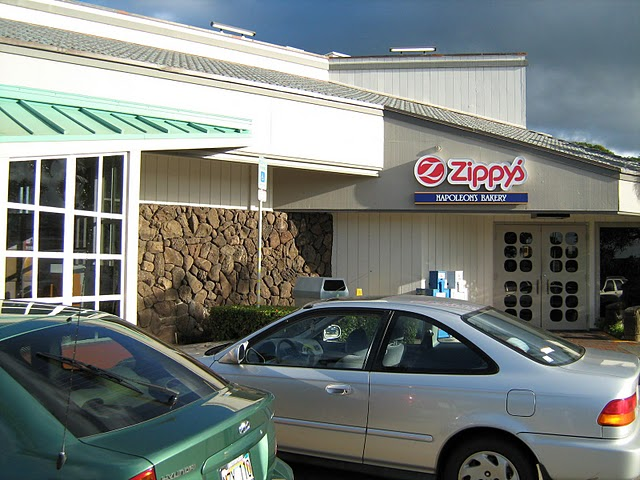
A Zippy's Restaurant with an attached Napoleon's Bakery, Oahu, Hawaii

Most Zippy's restaurants also contain a separate counter for Napoleon's Bakery. Two locations contain a separate sushi bar.

== See also ==
- List of Hawaiian restaurants
- List of restaurants in Hawaii
