= List of Hawaiian restaurants =

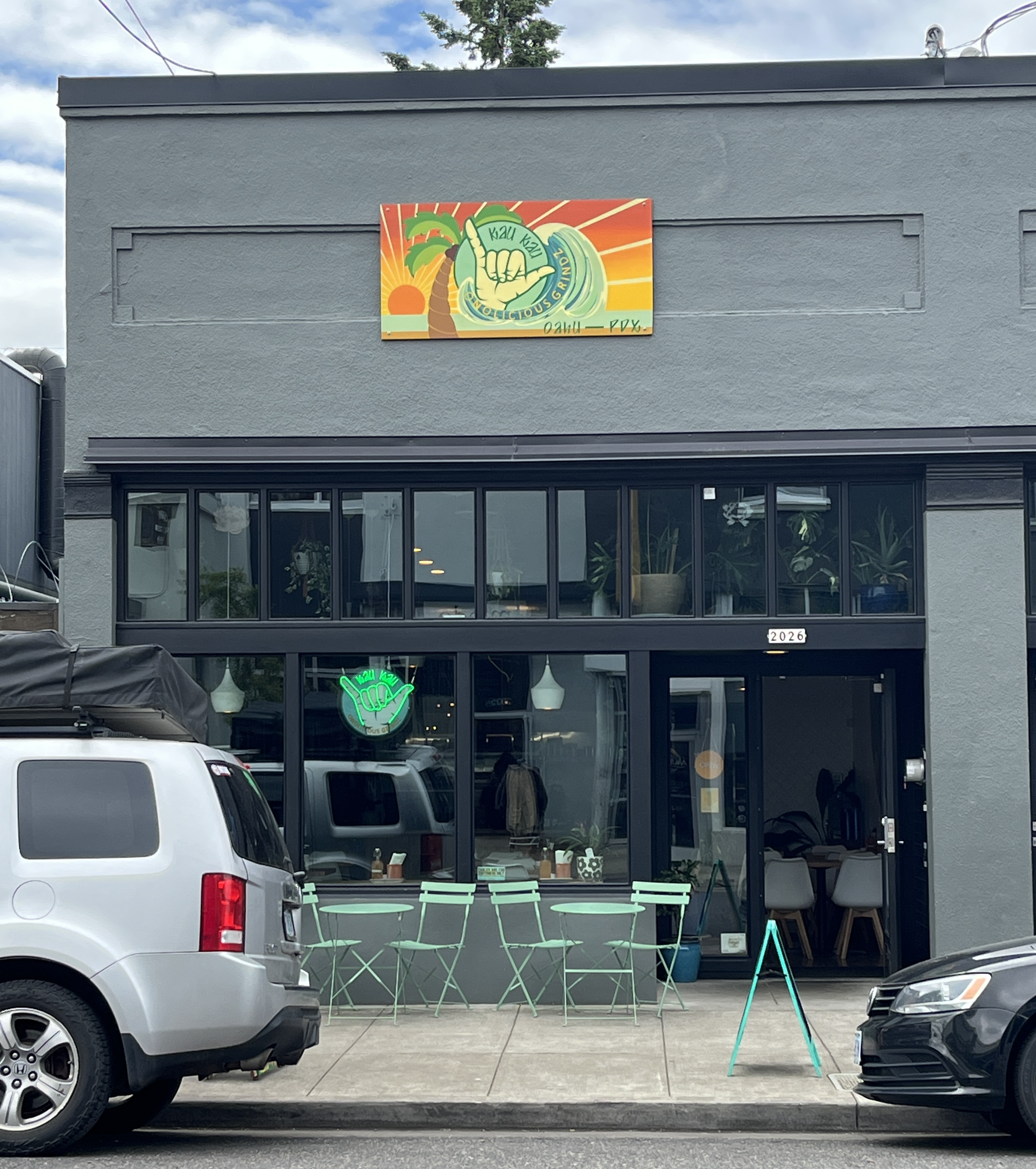
Kau Kau, Portland, Oregon

Following is a list of restaurants known for serving Hawaiian cuisine:

- Ate-Oh-Ate – Portland, Oregon
- Hapa PDX – Portland, Oregon
- Kau Kau – Portland, Oregon
- Noho's Hawaiian Cafe
- Tiffany's – Wailuku, Hawaii
- Wailua Shave Ice – Kauaʻi, Hawaii – San Diego, California – Portland, Oregon.
- Zippy's – chain based in Hawaii

== See also ==
- List of restaurants in Hawaii
