= List of restaurants in Hawaii =

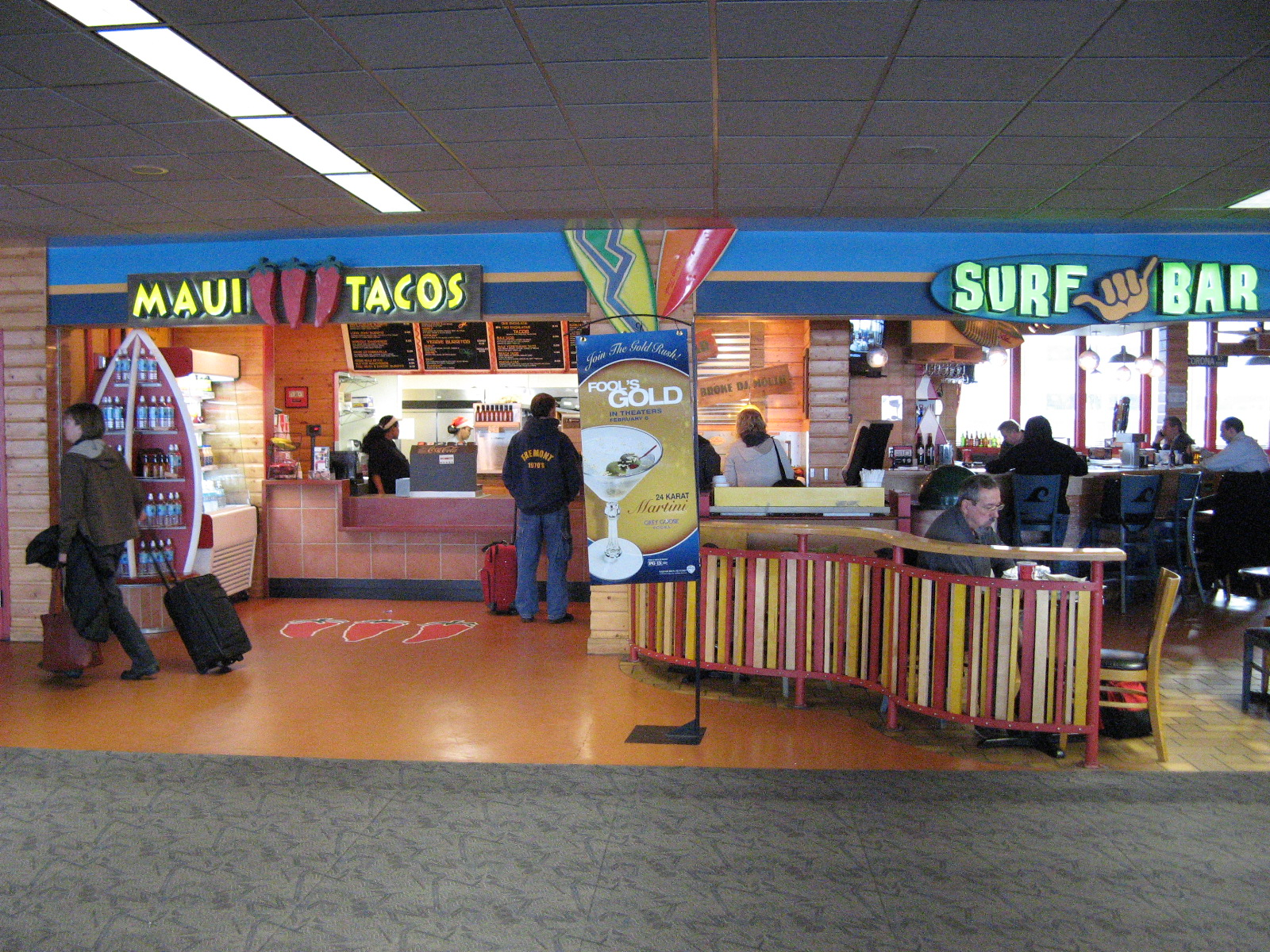
The interior of a Maui Tacos location

This is an incomplete list of notable restaurants in Hawaii.

== Restaurants in Hawaii ==
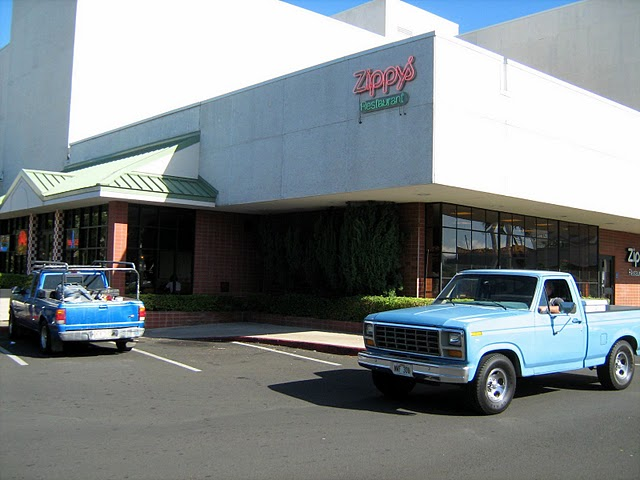
A Zippy's Restaurant, Oahu, Hawaii

- Anna Miller's – Restaurant chain
- Genki Sushi – Fast food chain
- Halekulani (hotel) – has three restaurants
- Kanemitsu Bakery – Bakery and restaurant on the island of Molokaʻi
- L&L Hawaiian Barbecue – Hawaii-themed franchise restaurant chain
- Maui Tacos – Restaurant
- Roy's
- Sam Choy's – American chef, restaurateur, and television personality
- Sushi Ginza Onodera
- Tiffany's, Wailuku
- Vintage Cave Club
- Wailua Shave Ice
- Zippy's – Hawaiian fast casual restaurant chain

== See also ==
- Cuisine of Hawaii
- List of Hawaiian dishes
- List of Hawaiian restaurants
- Lists of restaurants
