= Wailua Shave Ice =

Restaurant based in the U.S. state of Hawaii

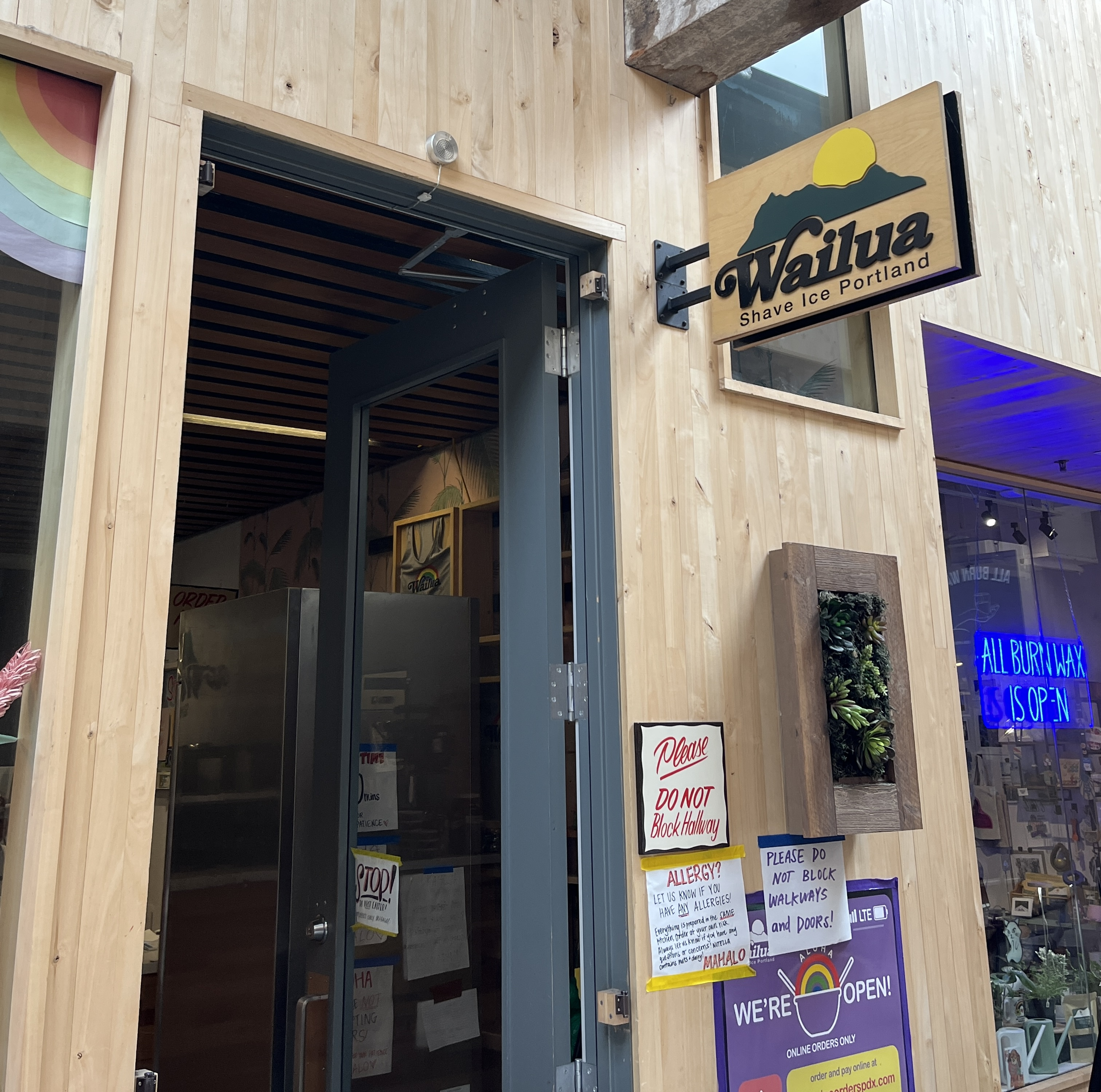
- The shop in Portland, Oregon, 2025

Restaurant information
- Established: 2015
- Location: California; Hawaii; Oregon, United States
- Website: wailuashaveice.com

Wailua Shave Ice is a Hawaiian shave ice restaurant chain, based in Kauaʻi. Established in 2015, the business also operates in San Diego and Portland, Oregon.

== Description ==
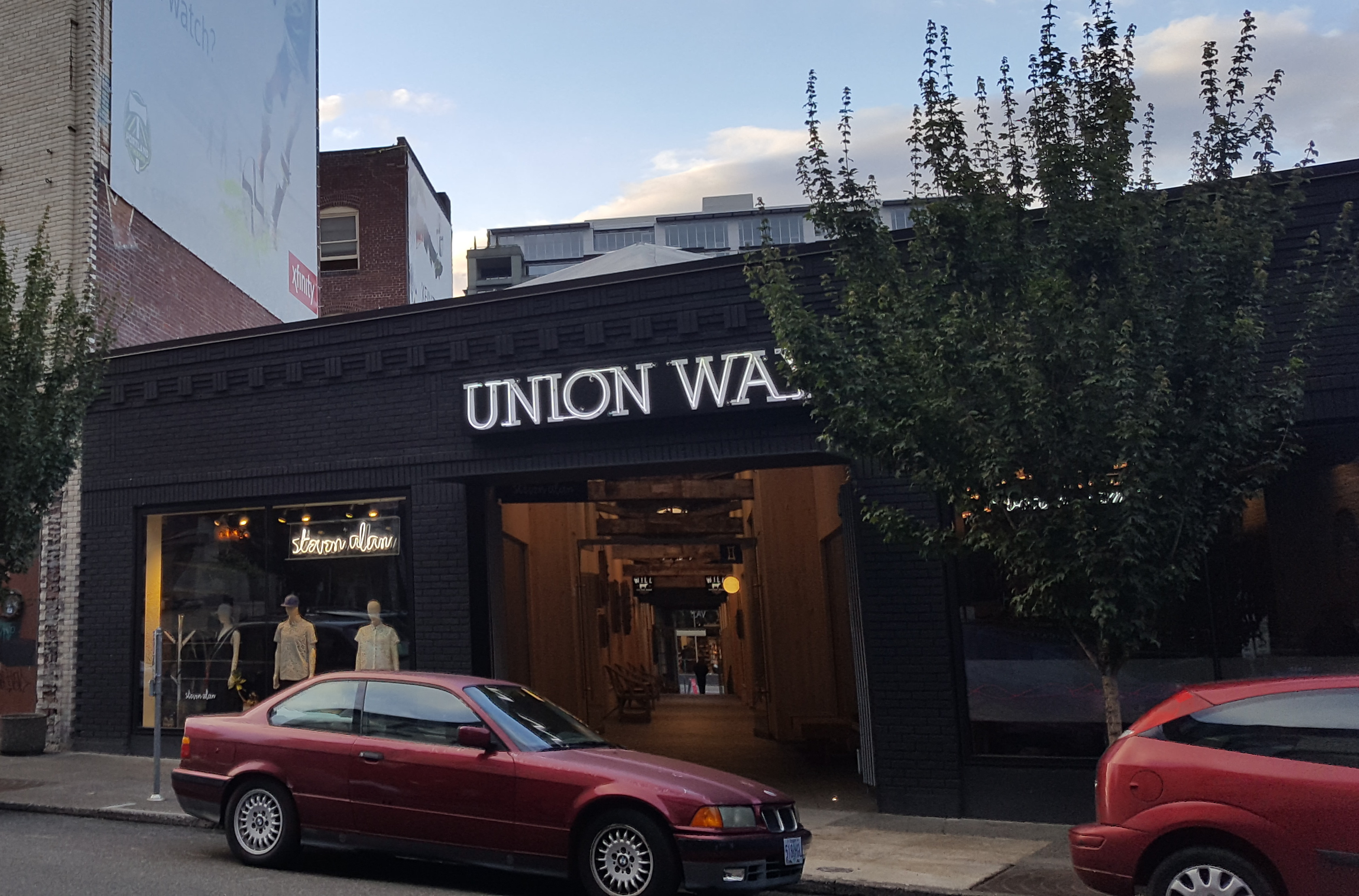
In Portland, Oregon, the business operates at Union Way (southern entrance pictured in 2016)

Wailua Save Ice serves Hawaiian shave ice in three locations: Kauaʻi, San Diego, and Portland, Oregon. In Hawaii, the business has operated a food truck and at Kauai Village Shopping Center. In Portland, the business operates at Union Way on West Burnside Street in downtown.

=== Menu ===
Wailua offers various flavors of shave ice with toppings. Syrups are made with fruit juice and cane sugar. Haupia foam, or whipped coconut milk, is the signature topping. Lilikoʻi cream is another topping option.

Shave ice varieties include the 'Almond Joy', which has coconut syrup, nutella, and toasted coconut, and the 'Coconut x Coconut x Coconut' (or "Triple Coconut"), which has coconut milk, haupia foam, and shredded coconut. The 'Da Mango One' has mango juice, mango, and condensed milk, and the 'Dragons Blood' is made with dragon fruit, pineapple juice, organic honey, and pieces of pineapple as a topping. The 'Lava Flow' has coconut foam, pineapple juice, and strawberry puree, and the 'Love Potion #9' has vanilla bean syrup, strawberry puree, and strawberries. The Wailua Sunrise has orange juice, pineapple juice, and pieces of orange and pineapple as toppings. Other seasonal flavors of shaved ice include cookies and cream as well as guava.

Desserts can also come with a vanilla ice cream base. The menu also include acai bowls, butter mochi, lemon peel gummies, and Li Hing lemon peel red vines.

== History ==
Cory Arashiro and Brandon Baptiste co-founded the business in 2015. Josh Tamaoka is a co-owner.

Wailua initially operated as a food truck, also described as a "vivid red food wagon". In 2017, the business announced plans to open a first brick and mortar shop at Kilauea Lighthouse Village.

A second location opened in San Diego.

The Portland location opened as the chain's third in June 2017, in the space previously occupied by Little T Baker. Before establishing a permanent presence in Portland, the business completed a "test-run" at Lardo in 2016.

== Reception ==
Tasting Table included Wailua in a 2017 overview of Kauaʻi's best shaved ice. In 2017, Martha Cheng included the business in Hawaii Magazine's 2017 overview of "must-try Kauai street eats, pop-ups and food trucks". Wailua was also included in the magazine's lists of the five best shaved ice stands on Kauaʻi in 2019 and 2024. In 2019, KGW said the business was Portland's "most Instagrammable way to cool off". Cheng later included Wailua in Eater's 2021 list of the nine "most refreshing" shaved ice establishments in Hawaii.

== See also ==
- List of Hawaiian restaurants
- List of restaurant chains in the United States
- List of restaurants in Hawaii
- List of restaurants in Portland, Oregon
