= Noho's Hawaiian Cafe =

Hawaiian restaurant in the U.S. state of Oregon

- Exterior of the restaurant in Northeast Portland, Oregon, 2022

Restaurant information
- Food type: Hawaiian; pan-Pacific
- Location: Oregon, United States
- Website: nohos.com

Noho's Hawaiian Cafe is a Hawaiian restaurant chain based in the U.S. state of Oregon. The business has operated in Medford and Portland. The original location in Southeast Portland's Hosford-Abernethy neighborhood closed in early 2019 and the location in Northeast Portland's Beaumont-Wilshire neighborhood is slated to closed in December 2026.

== Description ==
The restaurant chain Noho's Hawaiian Cafe has operated in Medford and Portland, Oregon. The business currently operates on Fremont Street in Northeast Portland's Beaumont-Wilshire neighborhood. The location has a large dining room and a tiki-themed back patio a fire pit. It has also hosted happy hour.

Previously, Noho's operated on Clinton Street at 26th Avenue in Southeast Portland's Hosford-Abernethy neighborhood. The location had wood floors and surfboards hanging from walls. It also sometimes played live music and was described as having a "bustling friendly atmosphere" in a guide book by Moon Publications. The location was also described as "super-cheery".

Noho's has also offered catering service.

=== Menu ===
Noho's serves Hawaiian and "pan-Pacific" cuisine, according to Eater Portland. The menu has included chicken teriyaki, kalua pork, Korean short ribs, loco moco, macaroni salad, and ono chicken. The restaurant has also served a burger, stir-fried ahi, mochiko chicken, poke, and yakisoba noodles. Dessert options have included coconut cake and chocolate-jalapeño pie. The drink menu has included Hawaiian beers and white wine, as well as cocktails with rum.

== History ==
Brothers Noho and Roy Marchesi started the business in Portland because they missed food from Hawaii. According to KHON-TV, the brothers used "recipes shaped by family traditions and Hawaiʻi's multicultural food culture". Noho's was later owned by Noho and Shelley Marchesi.

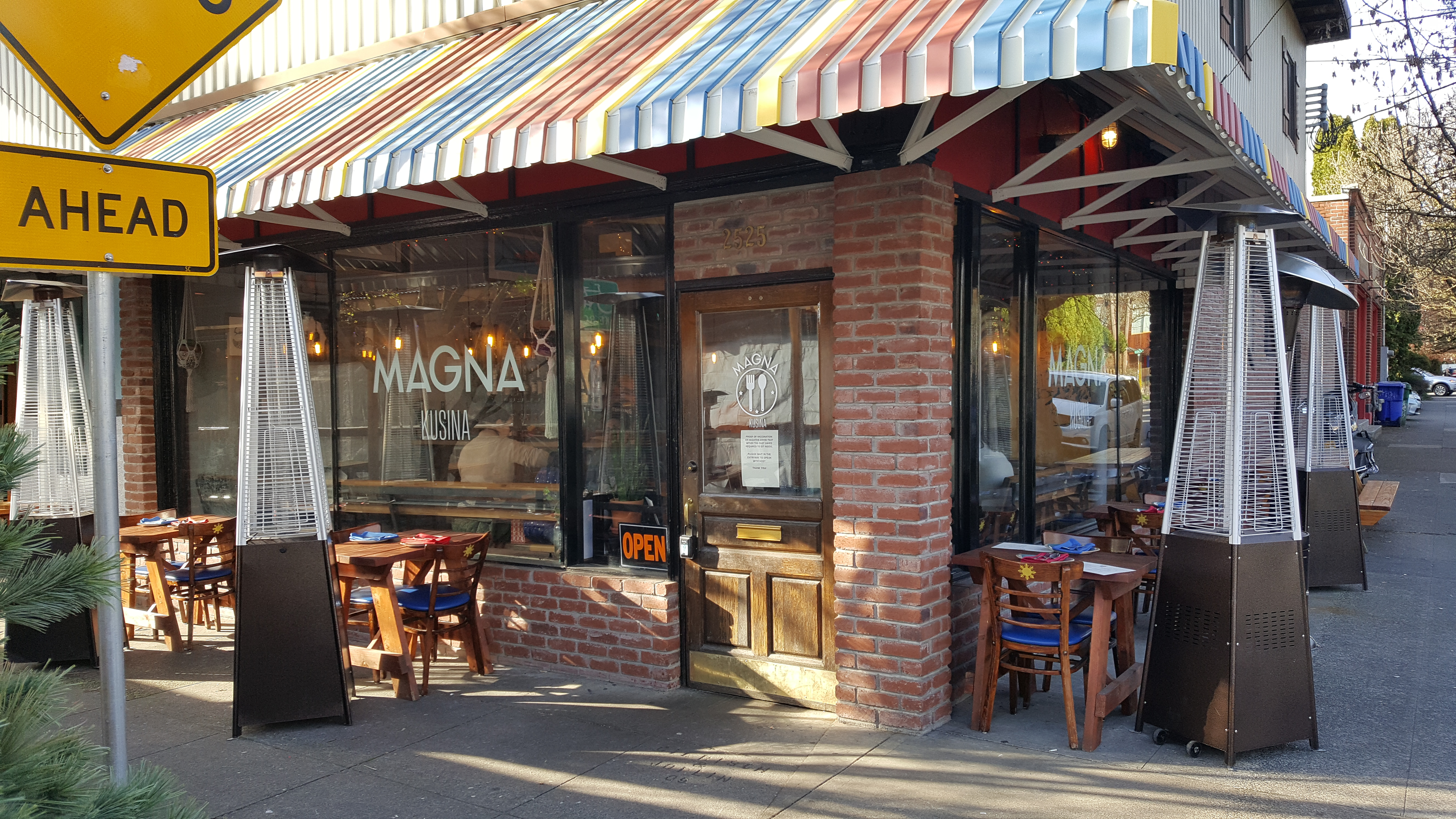
2022 photograph of the exterior of Magna Kusina, which operates in the space that previously housed the original Noho's Hawaiian Cafe location, in Southeast Portland's Hosford-Abernethy neighborhood.

The original location in Southeast Portland opened in 1994 and closed on January 31, 2019. The Filipino restaurant Magna Kusina later operated in the space.

In 2019, the Medford location was among three restaurants sued by someone in Florida who filed multiple Americans with Disabilities Act lawsuits.

The Northeast Portland location opened in 2010, in the space that previously housed Blue Olive Mediterranean. The location is slated to close on December 13, 2026, after operating for approximately 33 years. The owners have attributed the closure to rising operating costs.

== Reception ==
In her 2003 book Secret Portland, Oregon: The Unique Guidebook to Portland's Hidden Sites, Sounds & Tastes, Ann Carroll Burgess said of the Southeast Portland location, "The place is usually packed, so be prepared to wait a while or consider take-out." In 2004, a writer for the Portland Mercury said, "Noho's is the kind of restaurant that makes me wish I had some sort of valve I could turn to release the already consumed food before it traveled to my hips. So massive is the smallest portion at Noho's, third world families have survived for weeks off a single plate."

In 2013, Noho's ranked eighth in Zagat's first 'Portland City Guide', which included a list of the city's ten best restaurants. A writer for Willamette Week said the Southeast Portland location was "swankiest Hawaiian joint" in 2014. Noho's ranked third in the Best Teriyaki category of the newspaper's annual 'Best of Portland' readers' poll in 2016, and was finalist in the Best Hawaiian Food category in 2026. The business ranked number 22 in Yelp's 2018 overview of the nation's best sit-down restaurants.

Krista Garcia and Jenni Moore included Noho's in Eater Portland's 2022 overview of fifteen restaurant in Portland with "heavenly" Hawaiian food. Nathan Williams included the business in the website's 2023 list of elevent "spectacular" eateries in Beaumont-Wilshire. In 2025, Michael Russell of The Oregonian called Noho's "an old-school favorite".

== See also ==
- List of Hawaiian restaurants
