= Tiffany's (restaurant) =

Restaurant in Wailuku, Hawaii, U.S.

- Interactive map of Tiffany's

Restaurant information
- Chef: Sheldon Simeon
- Food type: Hawaiian
- Location: 1424 Lower Main Street, Wailuku, Hawaii, 96793, United States
- Coordinates: 20°53′41″N 156°29′37″W
- Website: tiffanysmaui.com

Tiffany's is a Hawaiian restaurant in Wailuku, Hawaii, owned and operated by Sheldon Simeon and his wife, Tiffany. The business was included in The New York Times's 2023 list of the 50 best restaurants in the United States.

== See also ==
- List of Hawaiian restaurants
- List of restaurants in Hawaii
