= Shut Up and Eat =

Defunct restaurant in Portland, Oregon, US

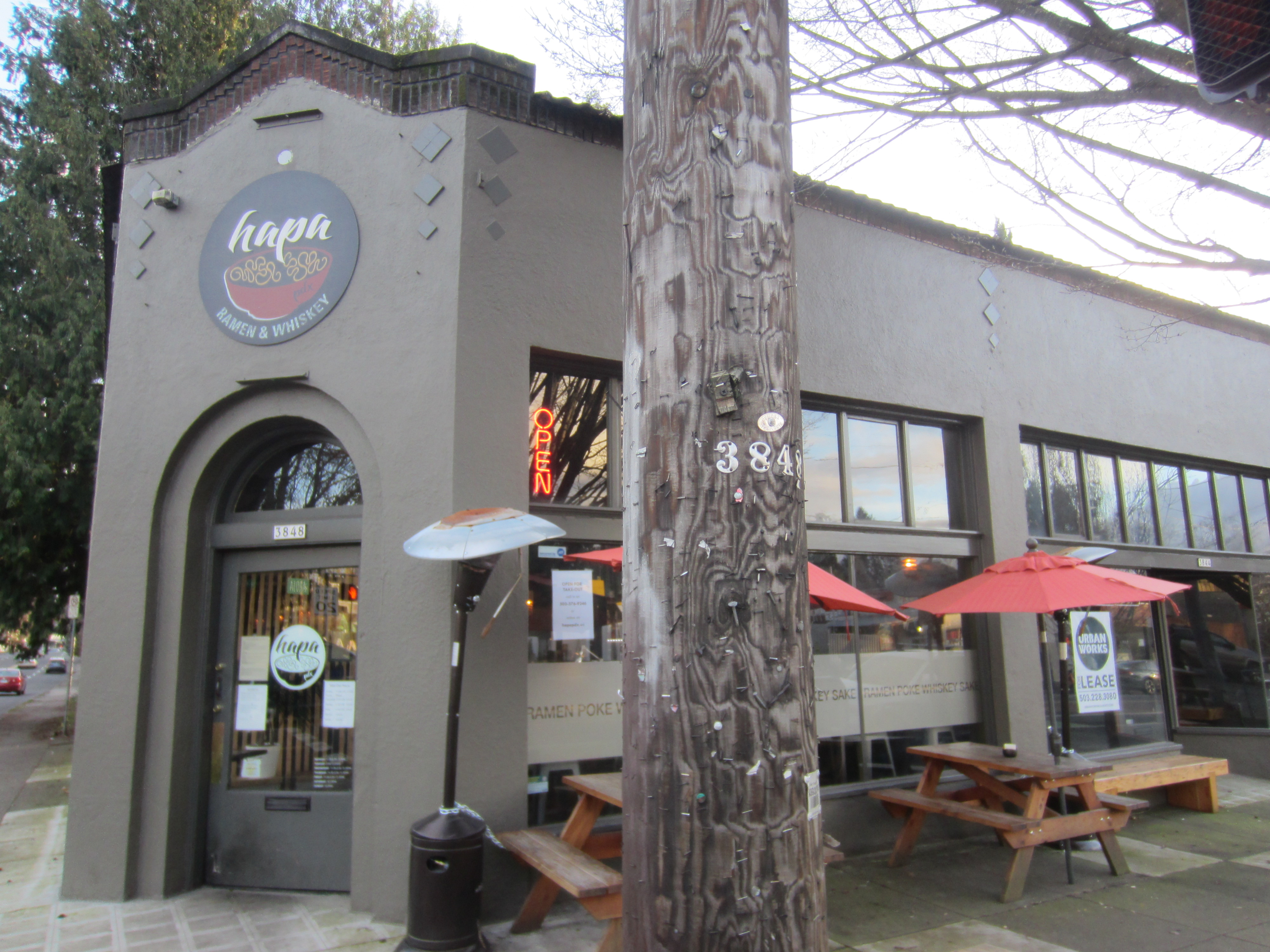
- Hapa PDX (pictured in 2021) operates in the building that previously housed Shut Up and Eat from 2012 to 2019.
- Interactive map of Shut Up and Eat

Restaurant information
- Established: 2010
- Closed: March 2019
- Owners: John Fimmano; Glenn Hollenbeck
- Chef: John Fimmano
- Location: 3848 Southeast Gladstone Street, Portland, Multnomah, Oregon, 97202, United States
- Coordinates: 45.4932°N 122.62281°W
- Seating capacity: 30

Shut Up and Eat was a sandwich shop in Portland, Oregon, United States. The business was established as a food cart in 2010 by John Fimmano and Glenn Hollenbeck, and later became a brick and mortar operation in 2012. Shut Up and Eat garnered a positive reception before closing in 2019.

== Description ==
Shut Up and Eat was a "Philly-inspired" food cart at the A La Carts pod on Division Street, and later a brick and mortar sandwich shop at the intersection of Cesar Chavez Boulevard and Gladstone Street in southeast Portland's Creston-Kenilworth neighborhood. Portland Mercury's Ned Lannamann described the interior as containing indoor and outdoor seating, additionally noting the large kitchen. Willamette Week's Martin Cizmar wrote that the restaurant's design looked similar to "a classic lunch counter", stating that the restaurant had no patio. Shut Up and Eat had a seating capacity of approximately 30 people.

The casual counter-service restaurant's menu included breakfast, meatball, and submarine sandwiches, as well as cheesesteaks, such as the "Broad Street Bomber". The "Butternut Squash" sandwich had roasted butternut squash, egg, and arugula on an English muffin. The mortadella sandwich had mortadella, provolone, fried egg, and caramelized onions. Pearl Bakery supplied the bread. Shut Up and Eat also offered happy hour.

== History ==
Former Philadelphia resident John Fimmano and Glenn Hollenbeck started Shut Up and Eat as a food cart in the A La Carts pod on Southeast Division Street in 2010. According to Willamette Week, the duo met working for a commercial painting company. The business transitioned to a brick and mortar operation in 2012.

In 2011, Shut Up and Eat was a vendor at the Indulge at Jupiter festival's Food Cart Land expansion. The event was held at Jupiter Hotel and highlighted local eateries. In January 2014, Eater Portland's Erin DeJesus said Shut Up and Eat was planning to "open a next-door deli" with Fimmano's side dishes available by the pound. The deli opened on January 31.

For Pizza Week in 2014, a collaboration between Shut Up and Eat and Gladstone Street Pizza resulted in a special pizza with toppings from the roast-pork sandwich. In June 2017, there was a break-in.

The restaurant closed unexpectedly in March 2019. A note posted on social media and the restaurant's windows said:

Regretfully, after nearly ten wonderful years, Shut Up and Eat has served its last sandwich. As of 6 p.m. on Sunday, March 3rd, we have closed our doors for the final time. We are very grateful to everyone who has supported us over the past decade.

The Japanese-Hawaiian restaurant Hapa PDX began operating in the space, opening in August 2019.

== Reception ==
In her 2014 book Food Lovers' Guide to Portland, Oregon, Laurie Wolf said Shut Up and Eat "makes great sandwiches" with "terrific and well-matched toppings". She called the meatball sub "excellent" and said the restaurant, "despite the possibly disquieting name, is inviting and worth a trip. Or two." Anna Katz recommended the chicken or eggplant parmesan, seasonal salad, and shoestring fries in her 2019 book Easy Weekend Getaways from Seattle: Short Breaks in the Pacific Northwest.

Bradley Foster and Andy Kryza included Shut Up and Eat in Thrillist's 2013 list of bars and restaurants. Shut Up and Eat ranked first in the Portland Mercury's 2014 search for Portland's best Italian hoagie. The newspaper's Chris Onstad wrote, "The overly deep channel of tender peppers, the olive tapenade, and the hidden vein of hammered bitter greens aren't traditional, but the volume and variety make this a sandwich you tangle with to find big new flavors in every bite."

In 2014, Michael Russell of The Oregonian gave the restaurant a satisfactory rating. He wrote, "Shut Up and Eat might seem to be at a disadvantage compared with the flavor bombs at Portland sandwich hot spots Bunk and Lardo, with their remixed Cubanos, banh mis and tuna melts. But customers can't seem to get enough of these traditional subs, especially the super-burrito-sized cheesesteak." Russell included the mortadella sandwich in a 2015 overview of the city's best sandwiches, and ranked Shut Up and Eat number 9 in the newspaper's 2017 list of the city's 17 best sandwich shops.

Martin Cizmar of Willamette Week recommended Shut Up and Eat over Lardo, the restaurant's rival, in 2012. Thrillist called Shut Up and Eat "a sandwich shop favorite in Southeast Portland" and praised its expansive menu. The website's Drew Tyson included the Bomber in a 2015 overview of Portland's 11 best cheesesteaks. Alex Frane included Shut Up and Eat in The Daily Meal's 2015 list of five "amazing" sandwich shops in Portland and said the bacon cheddar fried egg is "probably the best bacon sandwich" in the city.
