= Hapa PDX =

Restaurant in Portland, Oregon, U.S.

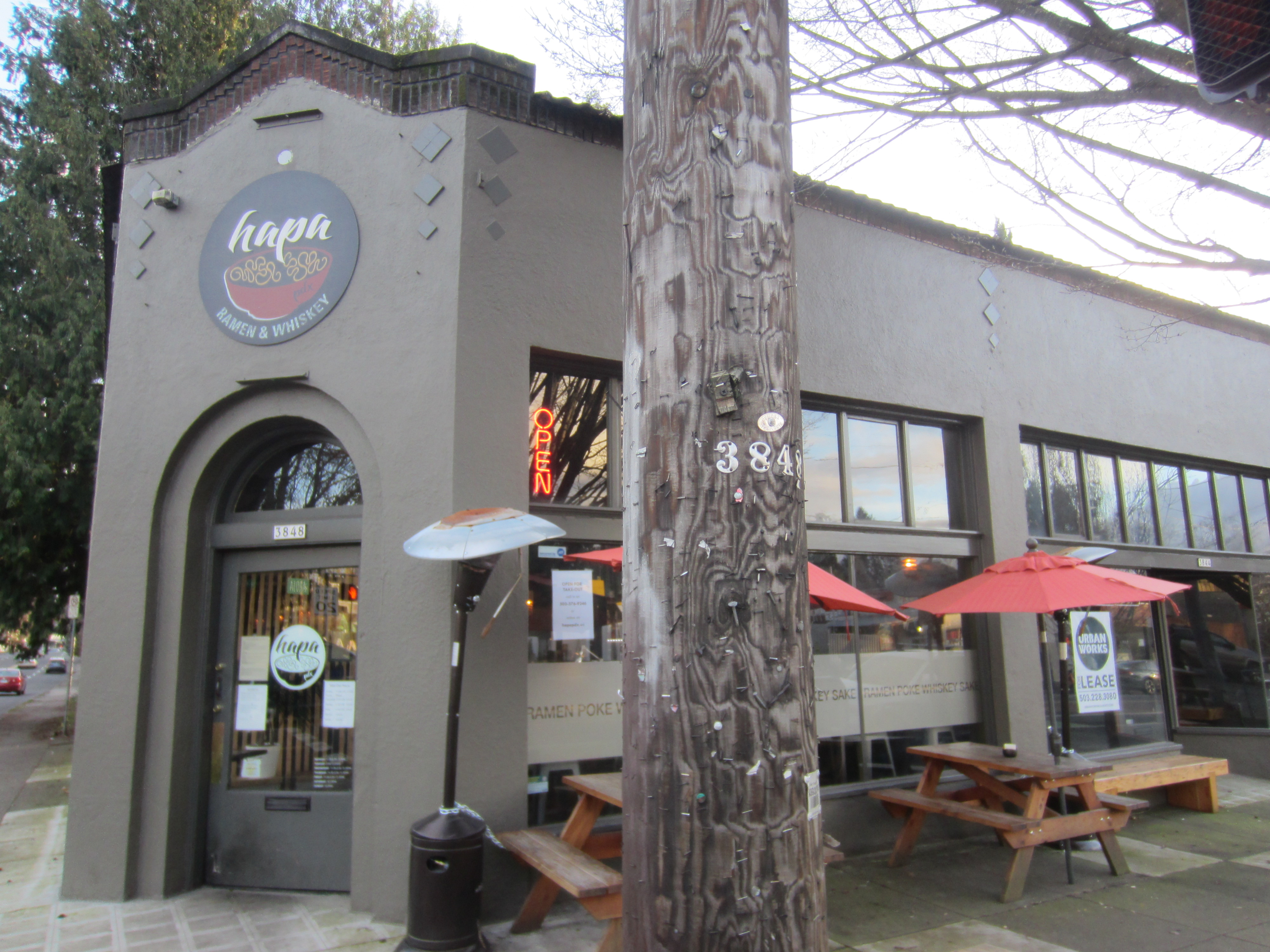
- The restaurant's exterior, 2021
- Interactive map of Hapa PDX

Restaurant information
- Established: 2013
- Owners: Michael Littman; Sarah Littman
- Location: 3848 Southeast Gladstone Street, Portland, Multnomah, Oregon, 97202, United States
- Coordinates: 45.4932°N 122.6228°W
- Website: hapapdx.us

Hapa PDX (also known as Hapa PDX Ramen and Whiskey and Hapa Ramen) is a restaurant in Portland, Oregon.

== Description ==
The restaurant serves Hawaiian-Japanese ramen, including tonkotsu, shoyu, miso, and shaka broth varieties. The G-Special is a pork belly-based ramen broth with pork belly, spinach, sprouts, and shiitake. According to Seiji Nanbu of Eater Portland, "Hapa's ramen is meant to be durable for long car rides home, with a thick and squiggly proprietary noodle recipe." Hapa has also served poke, wakame salad, and other snacks. The drink menu has included Japanese whiskey, bourbon, and rye, as well as Japanese and Oregon sakes.

== History ==
Owners Michael and Sarah Littman launched Hapa as a food cart in 2013. Hapa operated from the Tidbit Food Farm and Garden pod on Division Street in southeast Portland as of 2017. When the pod closed in 2017, the business relocated to Foster Road and 73rd.

In 2019, owners announced plans to open a brick and mortar restaurant on Gladstone Street in southeast Portland's Creston-Kenilworth neighborhood, in a space which previously housed Shut Up and Eat.

In 2022, the Littmans announced plans to open a second restaurant called Hapa Kauai at the Shops at Kukui‘ula in Kauai, Hawaii. The larger restaurant will have a slightly different menu but will also specialize in ramen. Abigail Cox, general manager of the Portland restaurant, has joined the ownership team.

== Reception ==
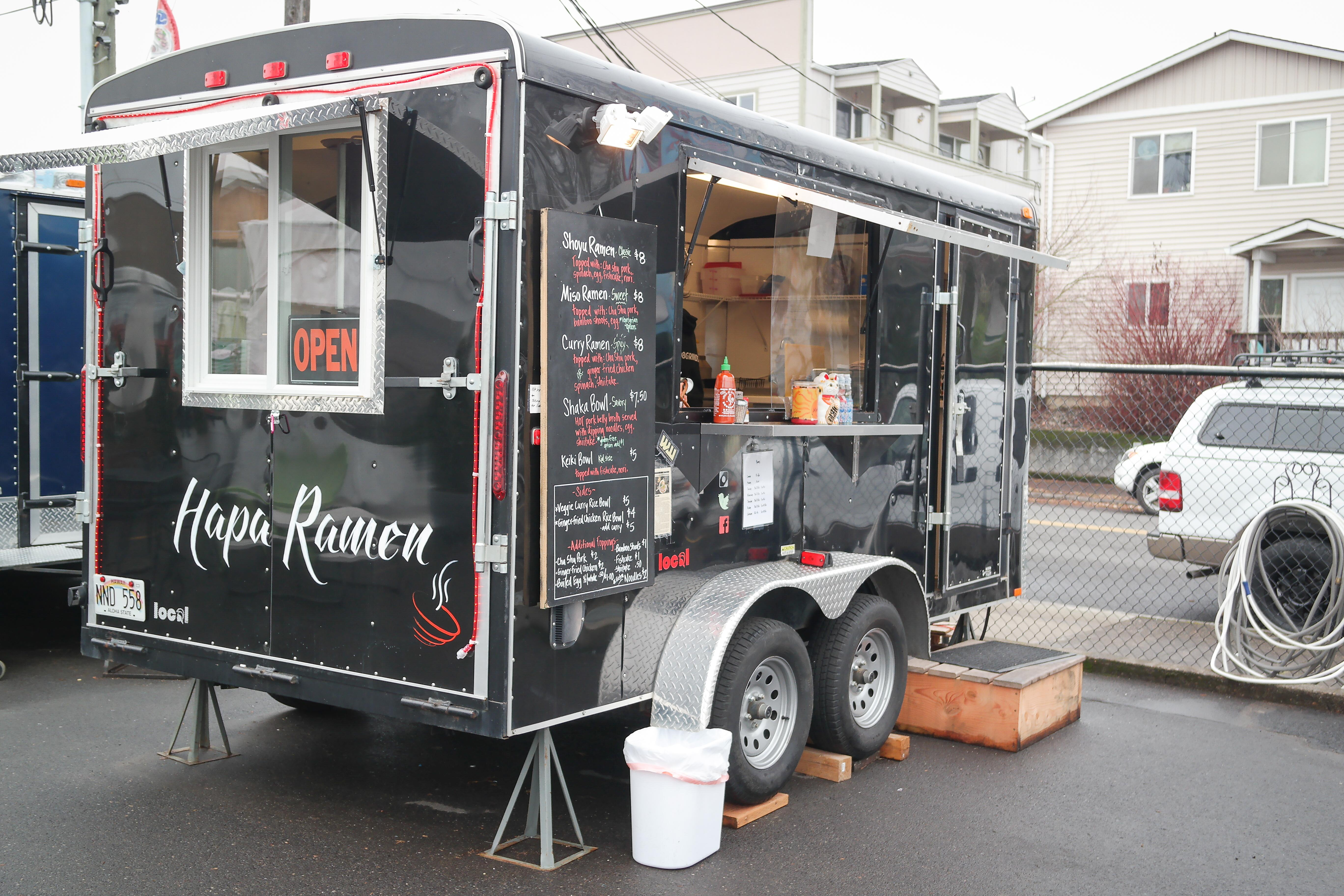
Food cart in 2013

Time Out Portland's Jen Woo included Hapa in a 2019 list of "the best food trucks in Portland to get your grub on." Alex Frane of Eater Portland wrote in 2019, " Hapa Ramen might be my new favorite ramen restaurant in town, with a much more limited menu and a smaller space than Afuri, but rich, delicious ramens and an excellent whisky selection." The website's Seiji Nanbu included the business in a 2022 list of "where to find knockout ramen in Portland and beyond". Nathan Williams included Hapa in a 2023 overview of "where to eat and drink" in the Creston-Kenilworth neighborhood.

In 2021 and 2022, Willamette Week said, "Lots of food carts make the leap to brick-and-mortar, but rarely is the effect quite so sexy as it is at Hapa... [T]his is very much an izakaya, and drinks are as much the attraction as the soup: The ginger ale-sake highball is worth traveling across town for."

== See also ==
- List of Hawaiian restaurants
- List of Japanese restaurants
- List of noodle restaurants
