= Ate-Oh-Ate =

Hawaiian restaurant chain in the U.S. state of Oregon

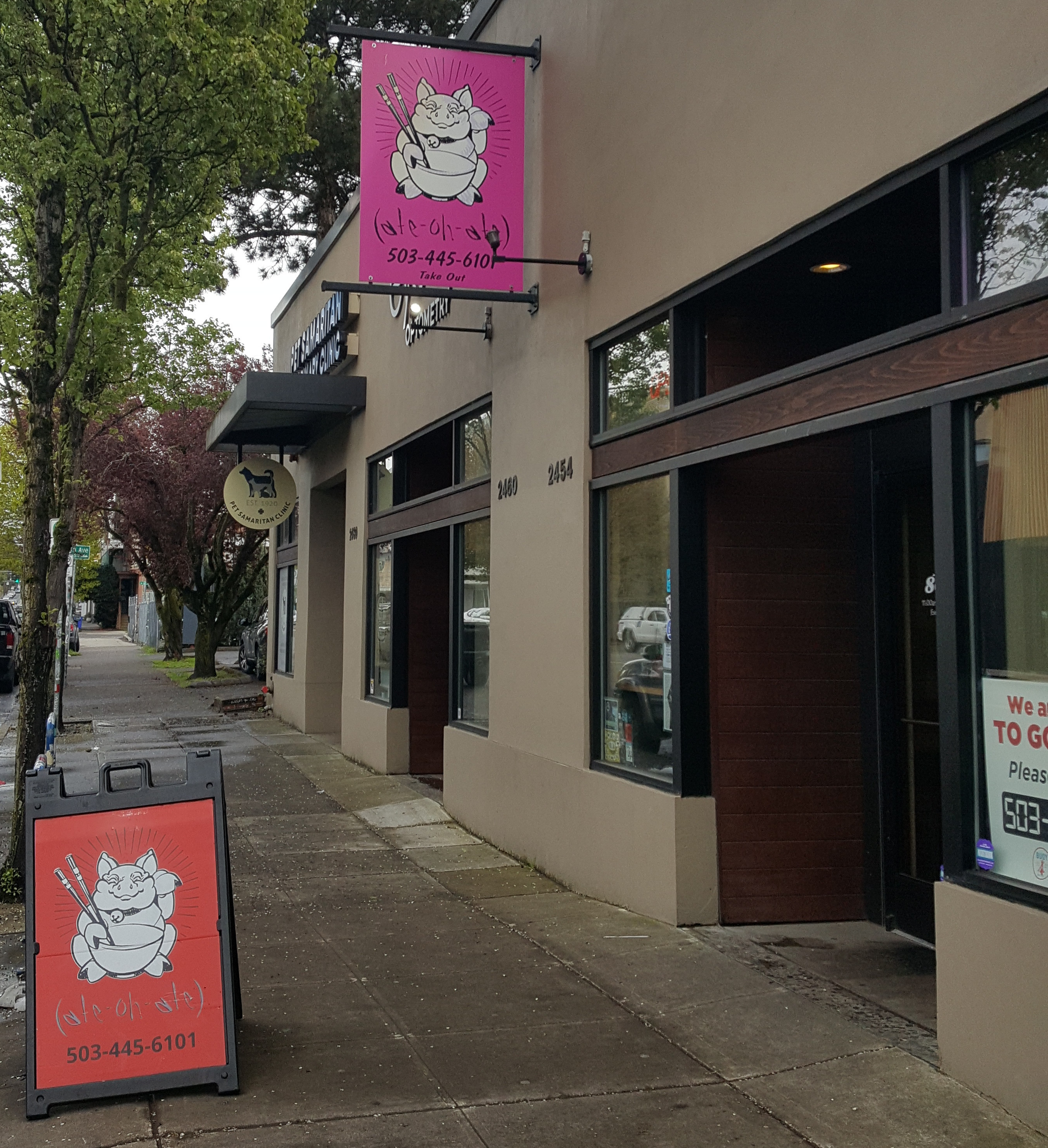
- Exterior of the original restaurant on East Burnside Street, 2022
- Interactive map of Ate-Oh-Ate

Restaurant information
- Owners: Ben Dyer; David Kreifels; Jason Owens
- Chef: Ben Dyer; David Kreifels; Jason Owens
- Food type: Hawaiian
- Location: Portland, Multnomah, Oregon, United States
- Coordinates: 45.47902°N 122.60855°W
- Website: ate-oh-ate.com

Ate-Oh-Ate is a small chain of Hawaiian restaurants in the Portland metropolitan area, in the U.S. state of Oregon. The business has two locations in Portland and another in Beaverton. Named after the area code 808 in Hawaii, the restaurant's logo depicts a "happy, well-fed" pig. Ben Dyer, David Kreifels, and Jason Owens are co-chefs and co-owners.

== Description ==
Ate-Oh-Ate small chain of Hawaiian restaurants in the Portland metropolitan area, with two locations in Portland and another in Beaverton. The interior of the original 40-seat restaurant on Portland's East Burnside Street has high ceilings, skylights, exposed wood, a 50-foot-long mural, and "several island-themed" tchotchkes. The outpost in southeast Portland's Woodstock neighborhood is 600 square feet and seats 48 people.

=== Menu ===
The menu includes an Aina burger with crispy pork belly, spicy mayonnaise, and kimchi relish, Spam musubi (fried egg wrapped in nori), beef short ribs, katsu chicken, and hekka. Vegan options include curry bowls and teriyaki grilled tofu. Tofu entrees are served with white rice and a green salad with sesame dressing or a macaroni salad. Ate-Oh-Ate also serves cocktails, beer, and shaved ice.

For the Portland Mercury's Nacho Week in 2019, the restaurant served "tarochos" (Taro chips with Kalua pig, Longboard kimchi queso, green onion, and shaved radish). During the COVID-19 pandemic, the restaurant's takeout menu included a variety of options such as rice bowls and sandwiches featuring pork shoulder slow-roasted in banana leaves, Korean short ribs, grilled Korean chicken, and grilled tofu.

== History ==
The original restaurant was slated to open in August 2010, as of May. Benjamin Dyer opened the restaurant on September 11, initially operating from 11 am to 8 pm. A grand opening party was held on October 19. Dyer, David Kreifels, and Jason Owens opened a second location in Woodstock in October 2016, with a slightly smaller menu.

Ate-Oh-Ate offered takeout and delivery service during the COVID-19 pandemic, as of May 2020. The restaurant was selling branded golfing discs as a way of generating income during the pandemic as part of a partnership with Nemo Design, as of late 2020. A third location began operating in Beaverton, on April 15, 2024, in the space previously occupied by Big's Chicken.

== Reception ==
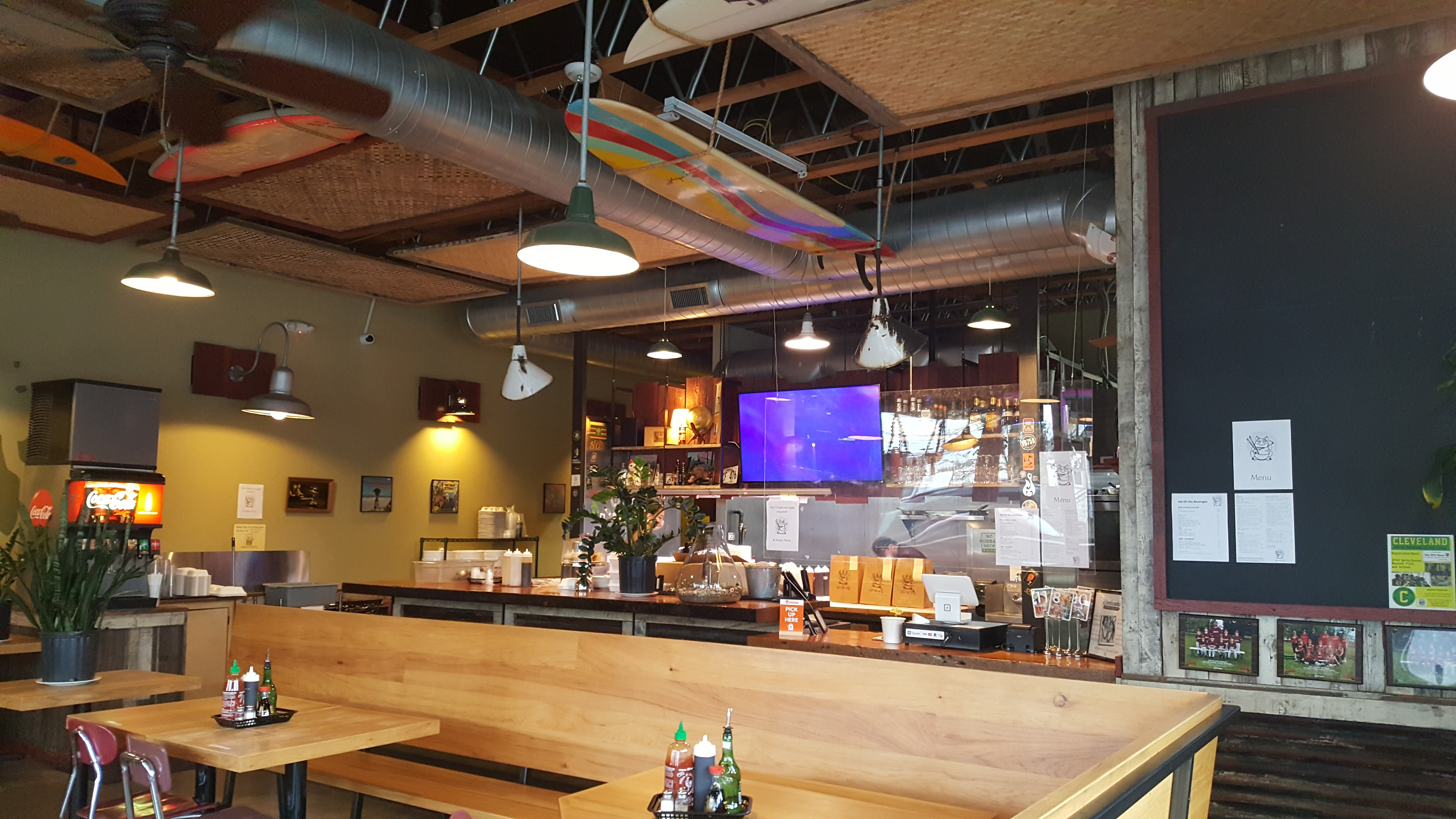
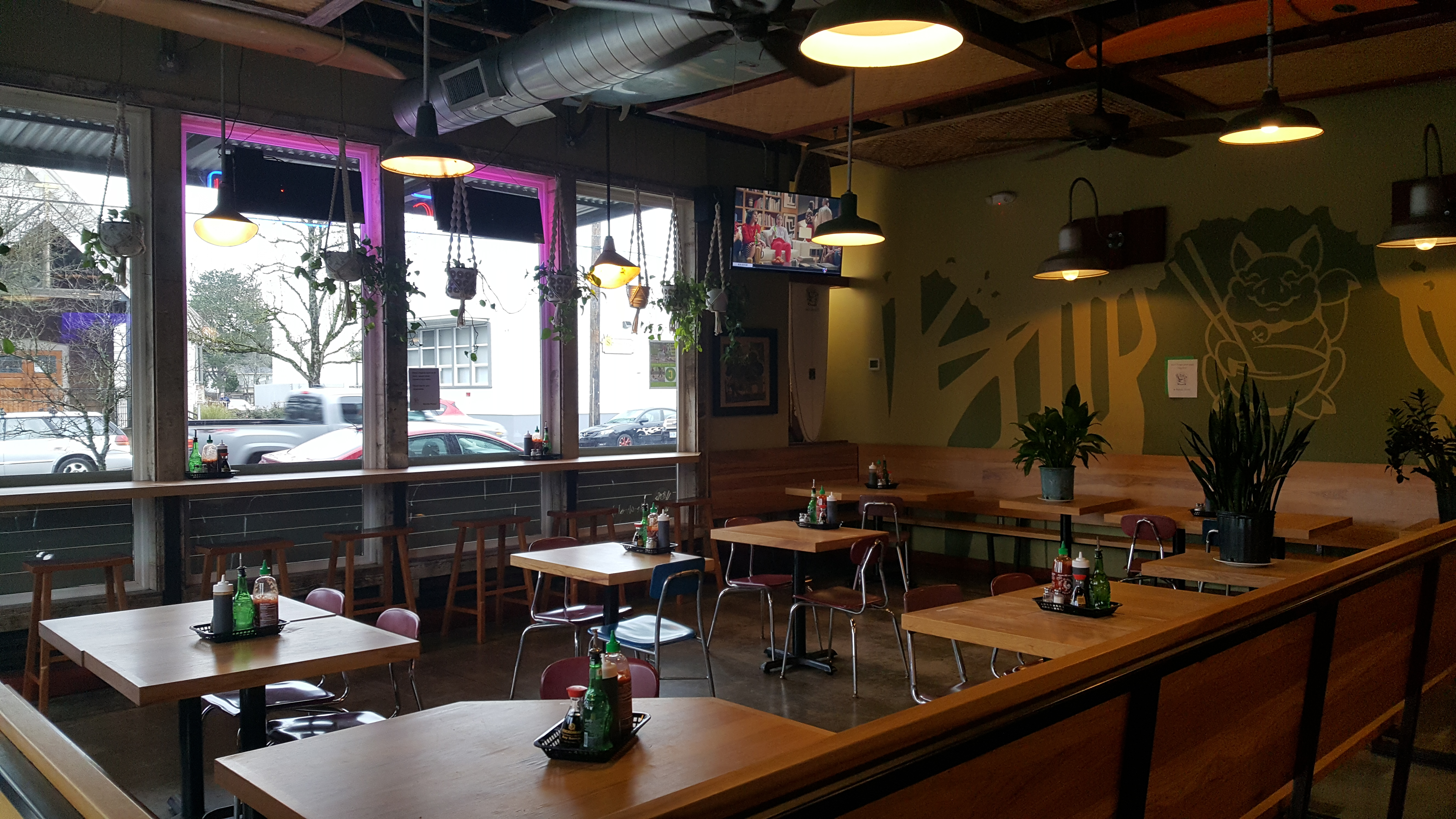
Interior counter (top) and seating area (bottom) of the Woodstock restaurant in 2021, during the COVID-19 pandemic

In 2014, Adam Lindsley of The Oregonian ranked the Aina burger number six in his list of the city's best burgers. Ate-Oh-Ate ranked number 87 on The Oregonian's 2015 list of Portland's 101 best restaurants. The newspaper's Samantha Bakall included the Spam musubi in a "cheap eats" guide of 99 "delicious dishes" for $10 or less. In 2015, Thrillist's Drew Tyson included Ate-Oh-Ate in his list of the 10 best chicken wings in Portland, and included the Aina burger in a list of the city's 11 best pork belly dishes.

Jay Horton of Willamette Week wrote in 2016, "While the utilitarian storefront slathered with islands-themed kitsch may awaken memories of a third-grade luau, Ate-Oh-Ate has loftier ambitions—wringing sophistication from a cuisine best known for embracing Spam... Ben Dyer has invested the food of his homeland with a seriousness of purpose, albeit one indulging the surfer lounge whimsy of a beliquored shave ice or tidal-strength mai tai." Ate-Oh-Ate was a runner-up in the Best Teriyaki category of Willamette Week's annual readers's poll in 2016. The newspaper's Pete Cottell included the Spam Musubi in his 2018 list of "eight must-have munchies for when you're stoned and starving".

The Portland Mercury's 2019 overview of city's best happy hours said, "Ate Oh Ate serves up legit happy hour Hawaiian fare and umbrella drinks without the Tiki flair, and the happy hour menu is an absolute steal." In 2020, Eater Portland's Krista Garcia and Jenni Moore included Ate-Oh-Ate in lists of thirteen restaurants for "heavenly Hawaiian food" in the city and thirteen "standout vegetarian meals" in Portland, respectively. The website's Ron Scott included the kalua pig sandwich in an overview of the city's "most epic hangover cures".

== See also ==
- List of Hawaiian cuisine restaurants
- List of restaurant chains in the United States
