= Carlo Lamagna =

Chef and restaurateur

- Occupations: Chef; restaurateur

Carlo Lamagna is a chef and restaurateur in Portland, Oregon. He opened Magna Kusina in Portland, the now-defunct Magna Kubo in Beaverton, and Magna Kainan in Denver, Colorado.

Born in the Philippines to two nurses, Lamagna moved to Canada nine months later, but spent most of his early years in Detroit before going back to the Philippines when he was 11 years old. Returning to the U.S. at the age of 20, he first attended Macomb Community College, earning an associate of applied sciences degree in Culinary Arts. He later attended The Culinary Institute of America in New York, and afterward was a chef at restaurants in Portland and Chicago. In 2021, Lamagna was named one of the Best New Chefs by Food & Wine magazine, and a year later, was a finalist for the James Beard Award for Best Chef: Northwest and Pacific.

Outside of the restaurant industry, Lamagna is a practitioner of Filipino martial arts and as of 2025 was involved in teaching a free weekly class open to the public.

== See also ==
- List of chefs
- List of Chopped episodes (season 41–present)
- List of restaurateurs
