= West's Block =

Historic building in Portland, Oregon, U.S.

- U.S. National Register of Historic Places
- U.S. Historic district – Contributing property
- Portland Historic Landmark
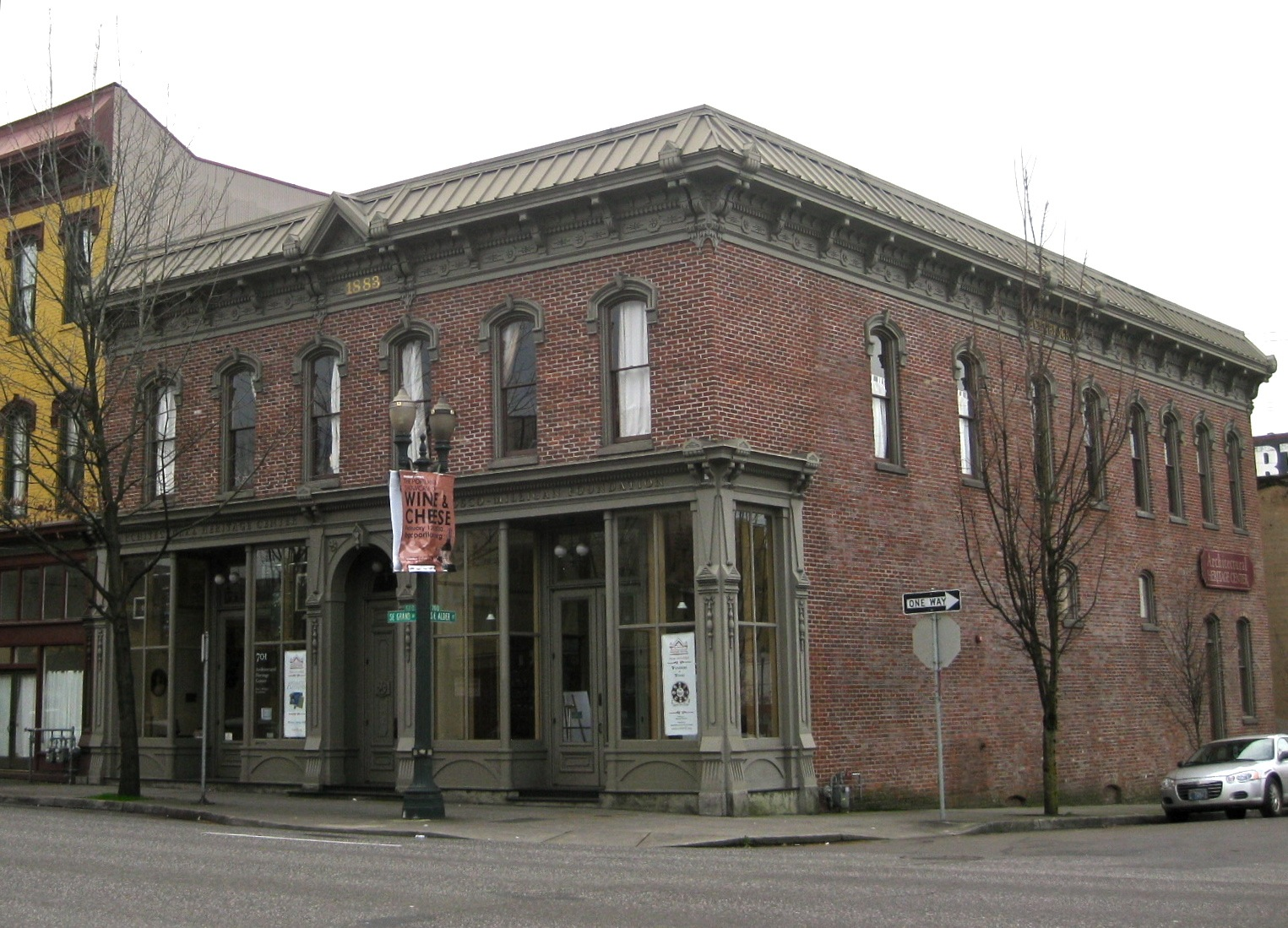
- The building's exterior in 2010
- Location: 701–707 SE Grand Avenue; Portland, Oregon
- Coordinates: 45°31′04″N 122°39′40″W
- Built: 1883
- Architectural style: Italianate
- Part of: East Portland Grand Avenue Historic District (ID91000126)
- NRHP reference No.: 80003378
- Added to NRHP: October 10, 1980

West's Block is a building in southeast Portland, Oregon listed on the National Register of Historic Places.

== See also ==
- National Register of Historic Places listings in Southeast Portland, Oregon
