= Hapa Pizza =

Restaurant in Beaverton, Oregon, U.S.

- Interactive map of Hapa Pizza

Restaurant information
- Location: 12755 Southwest Broadway Street, Beaverton, Oregon, 97005, United States
- Coordinates: 45°29′16″N 122°48′26″W
- Website: hapapizza.com

Hapa Pizza is a restaurant in Beaverton, Oregon, United States. The business was included in The New York Times's 2024 list of the 22 best pizzerias in the United States.
