= Little Griddle =

Restaurant in Portland, Oregon, U.S.

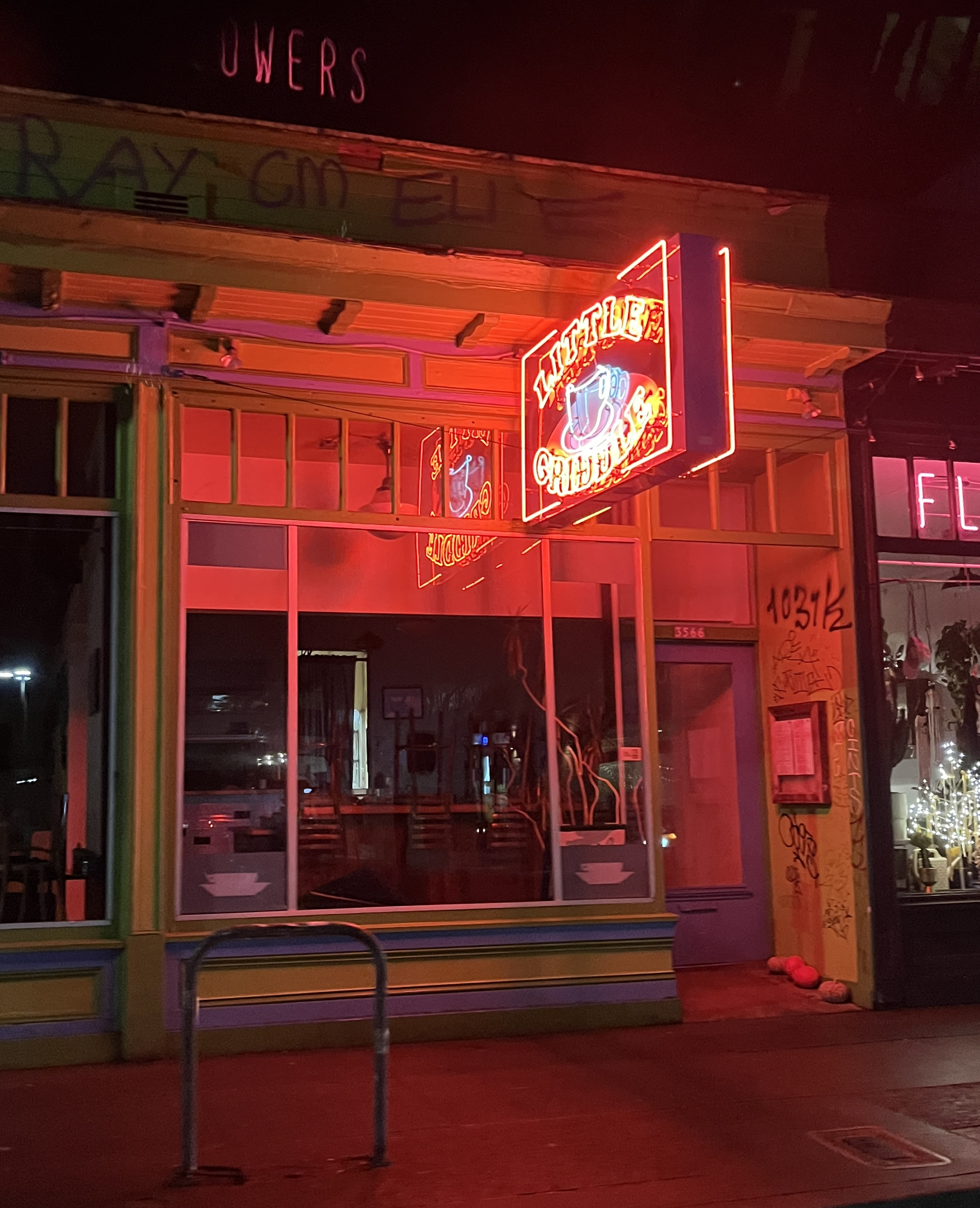
- Exterior of the southeast Portland location at night in 2024
- Interactive map of Little Griddle

Restaurant information
- Established: 2017
- Owners: Yossel Gyorgak; Karen Harding; Judd Harris
- Head chef: Judd Harris
- Location: 3520 Northeast 42nd Avenue, Portland, Multnomah, Oregon, 97213, United States
- Coordinates: 45.5486°N 122.6202°W
- Website: littlegriddlecafe.com

Little Griddle is a restaurant with two locations in Portland, Oregon, United States. The original cafe operates in northeast Portland's Beaumont-Wilshire neighborhood, and a second location is on Hawthorne Boulevard in southeast Portland's Richmond neighborhood.

Little Griddle was originally co-owned by Yossel Gyorgak and head chef Judd Harris, and Karen Harding became a co-owner in 2019. The business has garnered a positive reception and was included in lists of the nation's best breakfast and brunch restaurants by Travel + Leisure and Yelp.

== Description ==
Little Griddle operates two breakfast and brunch cafes in Portland, Oregon. The original 600-square-foot restaurant on Fremont Street in northeast Portland's Beaumont-Wilshire neighborhood has a seating capacity of 25 people, and a second location operates on Hawthorne Boulevard in southeast Portland's Richmond neighborhood.

The menu includes biscuits and gravy, French toast and pancakes, grain bowls, polenta with collards, and shakshouka. Eggs Benedict varieties have cured ham or braised pork shoulder, and Little Griddle also serves egg-and-cheese on buttermilk biscuits. Drink options Bloody Marys, mimosas, and coffee by Portland Roasting Coffee.

== History ==
The original Little Griddle opened in late 2017. Yossel Gyorgak, Karen Harding, and Judd Harris have been co-owners; Harris is also the head chef. Harding, who founded Cup & Saucer Cafe, became an owner of Little Griddle in 2019.

The Hawthorne location operates in a space previously occupied by Cup & Saucer Cafe. Little Griddle has hosted the Hawaiian pop-up Kau Kau.

== Reception ==
In 2021, Little Griddle was included in Yelp's list of the top 100 brunch restaurants in the U.S. In 2023, Little Griddle ranked number 33 in Yelp's same list and Amy Schulman included the business in Travel + Leisure's list of the nation's fifteen best breakfast restaurants. Zoe Baillargeon, Janey Wong, and Rebecca Roland included Little Griddle in Eater Portland's 2024 overview of the city's best breakfasts.
