= Magna Kusina =

Filipino restaurant in Portland, Oregon, U.S.

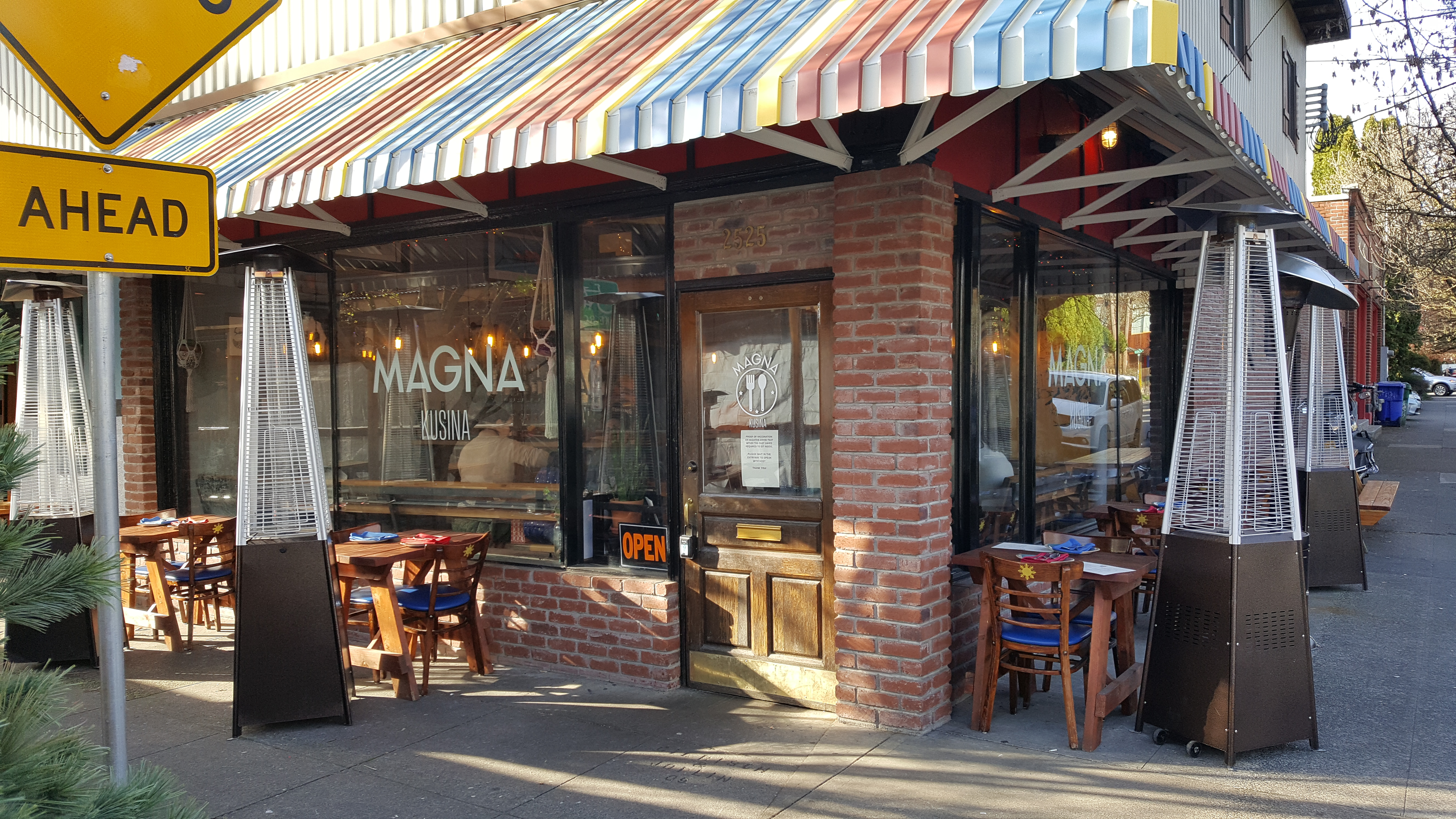
- The restaurant's exterior in March 2022
- Interactive map of Magna Kusina

Restaurant information
- Established: August 2019
- Food type: Filipino
- Location: 2525 Southeast Clinton Street, Portland, Oregon, 97202, United States
- Coordinates: 45°30′12.5″N 122°38′23.4″W

Magna Kusina is a Filipino restaurant in Portland, Oregon, United States. It is slated to close permanently in December 2026.

== History ==
Carlo Lamagna opened the restaurant in August 2019, in the space that previously housed Noho's Hawaiian Cafe.

The business planned to operate a stall in the food hall at Block 216, as of 2023. Instead, Sun Rice opened within the Moxy Portland Downtown.

Magna Kubo, described as a "spin-off" of Magna Kusina, operated in Beaverton from 2023 to 2024. In 2025, Magna Kusina was among local Filipino establishments that participated in a fundraiser for victims of the Vancouver car attack.

In November 2026, the business announced plans to close permanently on December 24.

== Reception ==
In 2021, Magna Kusina was named Restaurant of the Year by The Oregonian, and Lamagna was included in Food & Wine's class of Best New Chefs. Brooke Jackson-Glidden included the Mom's Crab Fat Noodles in Eater Portland's 2024 overview of "iconic" Portland dishes. Magna Kusina was included in The Infatuation's 2024 list of Portland's best restaurants. Michael Russell included the business in The Oregonian's 2025 list of the 21 best restaurants in southeast Portland. He also ranked Magna Kusina number 22 in the newspaper's 2025 list of Portland's 40 best restaurants. Hannah Wallace included the business in Condé Nast Traveler's 2025 list of Portland's 23 best restaurants.

== See also ==
- Filipino-American cuisine
- List of Filipino restaurants
