= Bistek =

Filipino dish

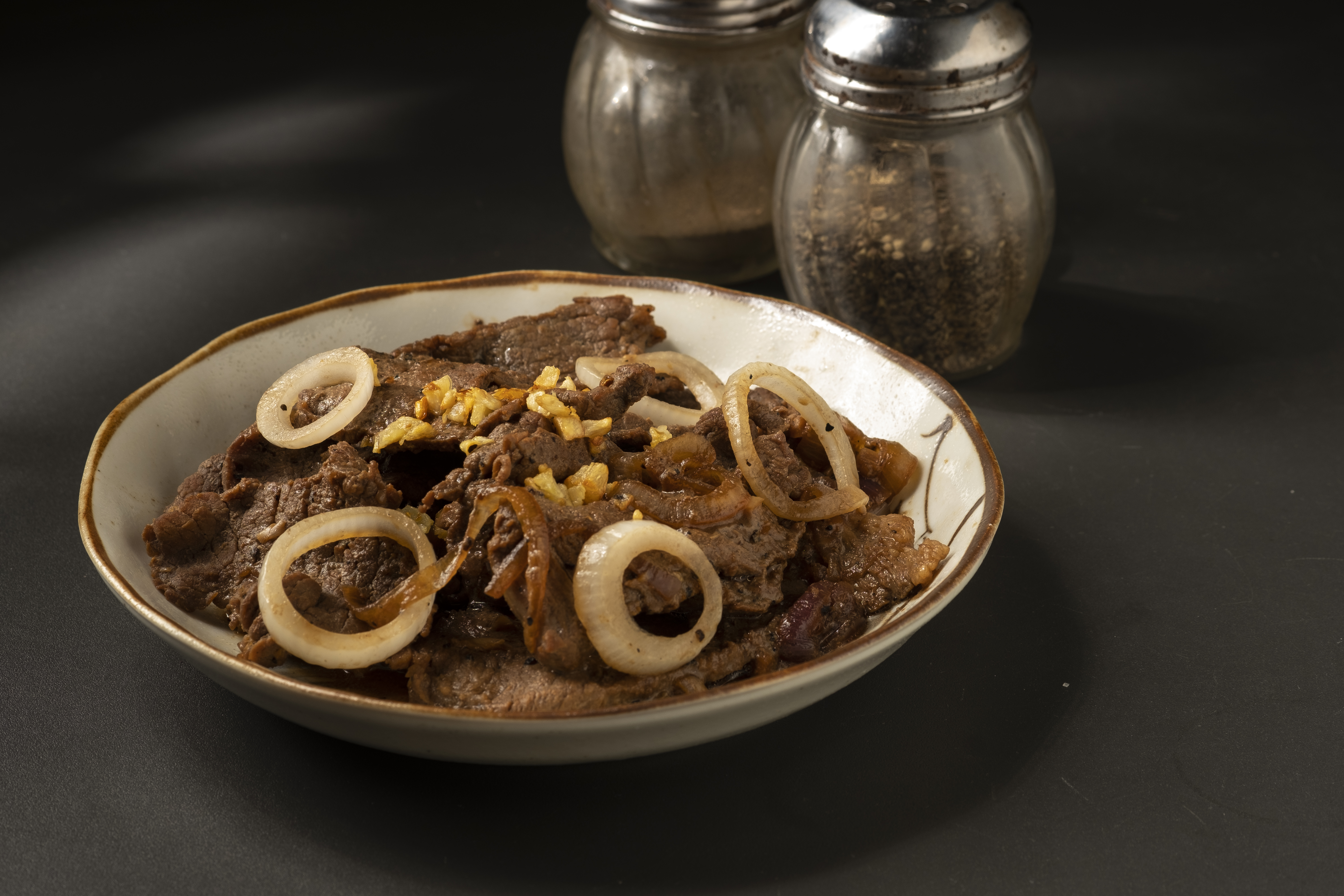
- Bistek tagalog
- Alternative names: bistek tagalog, bistik, bistig, bistec tagalo, carne frita, karne frita, karne prita
- Course: Main course
- Place of origin: Philippines
- Serving temperature: Hot
- Main ingredients: Beef sirloin or tenderloin, soy sauce, calamansi juice, garlic, onions, black pepper, bay leaves, sugar (optional)
- Other information: Eaten with rice

Bistek (from Spanish: bistec, "beefsteak"), also known as bistek tagalog or karne frita, is a Filipino dish consisting of thinly sliced beefsteak braised in soy sauce, calamansi juice, garlic, ground black pepper, and onions cut into rings. It is a common staple in the Tagalog and Western Visayan regions of the Philippines. It is eaten over white rice.

== Description ==
Bistek tagalog is made of strips of beef sirloin or tenderloin, usually flattened with a meat tenderizing tool, it is marinated then braised in soy sauce, calamansi juice (or some other citrus fruit like lime or lemon), smashed whole garlic cloves, ground black pepper, bay leaves, caramelized red onion rings, and (optionally) muscovado or brown sugar. In some recipes, fresh white onion rings are used instead to preserve its crunchiness.

In the Western Visayas, bistek tagalog is known as karne frita (also spelled carne frita, literally "fried meat" in Spanish), not to be confused with the breaded cutlet (milanesa), which is also called carne frita in the Philippines. It is cooked identically to the Tagalog version, but differs in that it is always cooked with sugar.

== Variations ==
A modern version of bistek is bistek na baboy ("pork bistek"; bistig babi in Kapampangan), in which pork—pork chops or pork belly slices—is used instead of beef. Other modern versions can also use slices of chicken or filleted fish.

Vegan versions can also substitute beef with tofu.

== Similar dishes ==
Bistec encebollado is a similar dish found throughout other Spanish-speaking countries. It differs from bistek tagalog in that it does not use soy sauce or citrus juices, but uses vinegar and various local herbs and ingredients instead. Other similar dishes include the bistec de Palomilla of Cuba, bistec a caballo of Colombia, and the bistec ranchero of Mexico.

In the Marianas Islands, Bistek is prepared similarly to Filipino Bistek, but is often made with vinegar instead of citrus juice. Achiote is also added and is typically served with peas.

== See also ==
- Philippine adobo
- List of Philippine dishes
