= Meat-Shaped Stone =

Qing Chinese jasper sculpture

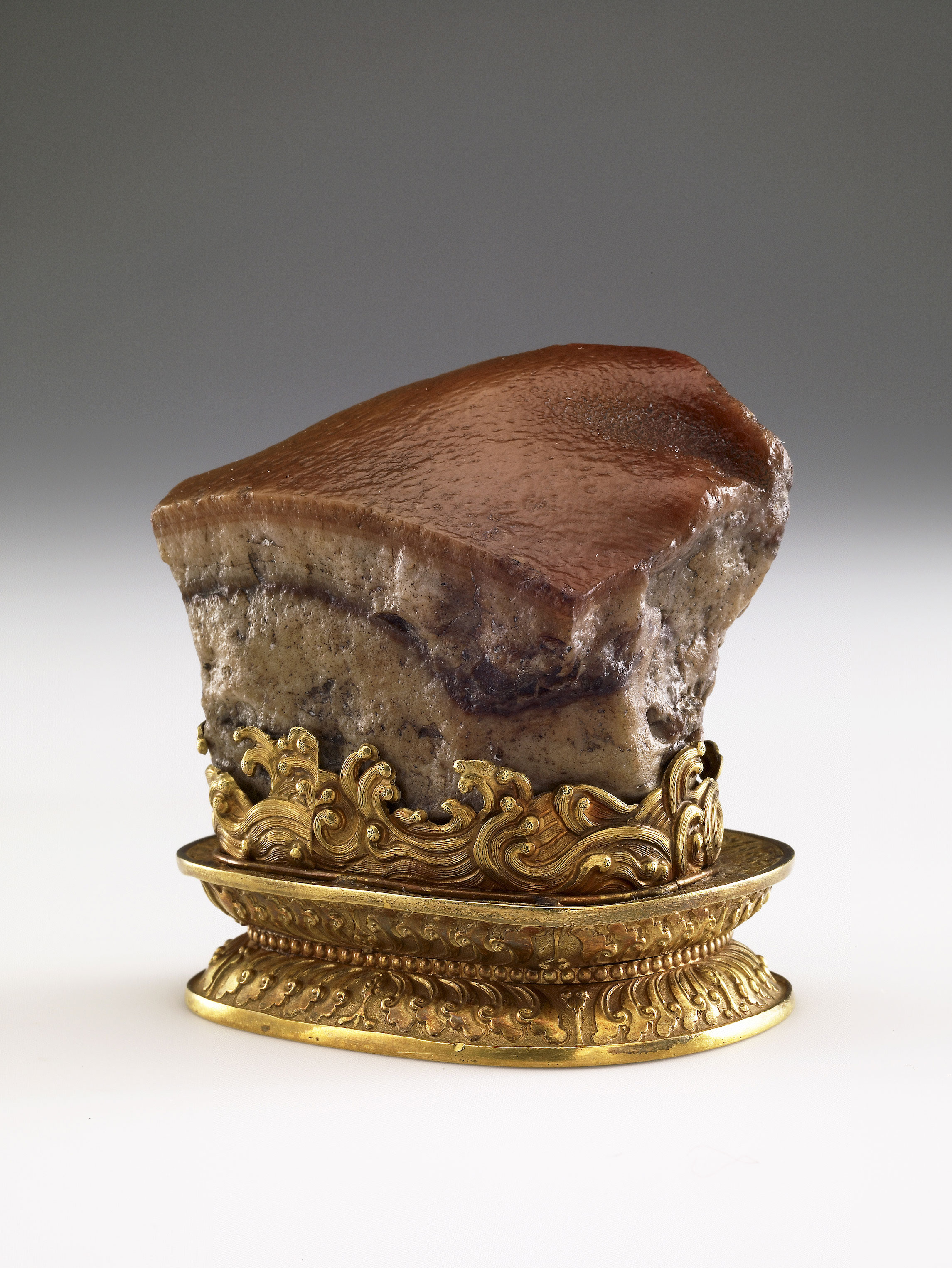
- Artist: Unknown
- Year: 19th century
- Medium: Jasper
- Dimensions: H 5.73 cm, W 6.6 cm, D 5.3 cm
- Location: National Palace Museum; Taipei

The Meat-Shaped Stone (Chinese: 肉形石; pinyin: ròuxíngshí) is a piece of jasper carved into the shape of a piece of Dongpo pork, a Chinese way of cooking pork belly. After the retreat of the government of the Republic of China to Taiwan, it is in the collection of the National Palace Museum in Taipei, Taiwan.

The Meat-Shaped Stone, along with the Jadeite Cabbage and the Mao Gong Ding, is called one of the Three Treasures of the National Palace Museum. It has also been chosen by the public as the most important item in the museum's entire collection.

== History ==
The stone was carved during the Qing dynasty from banded jasper. The layers of the stone accumulated naturally over the years, exhibiting various shades of hues.

== Gallery ==
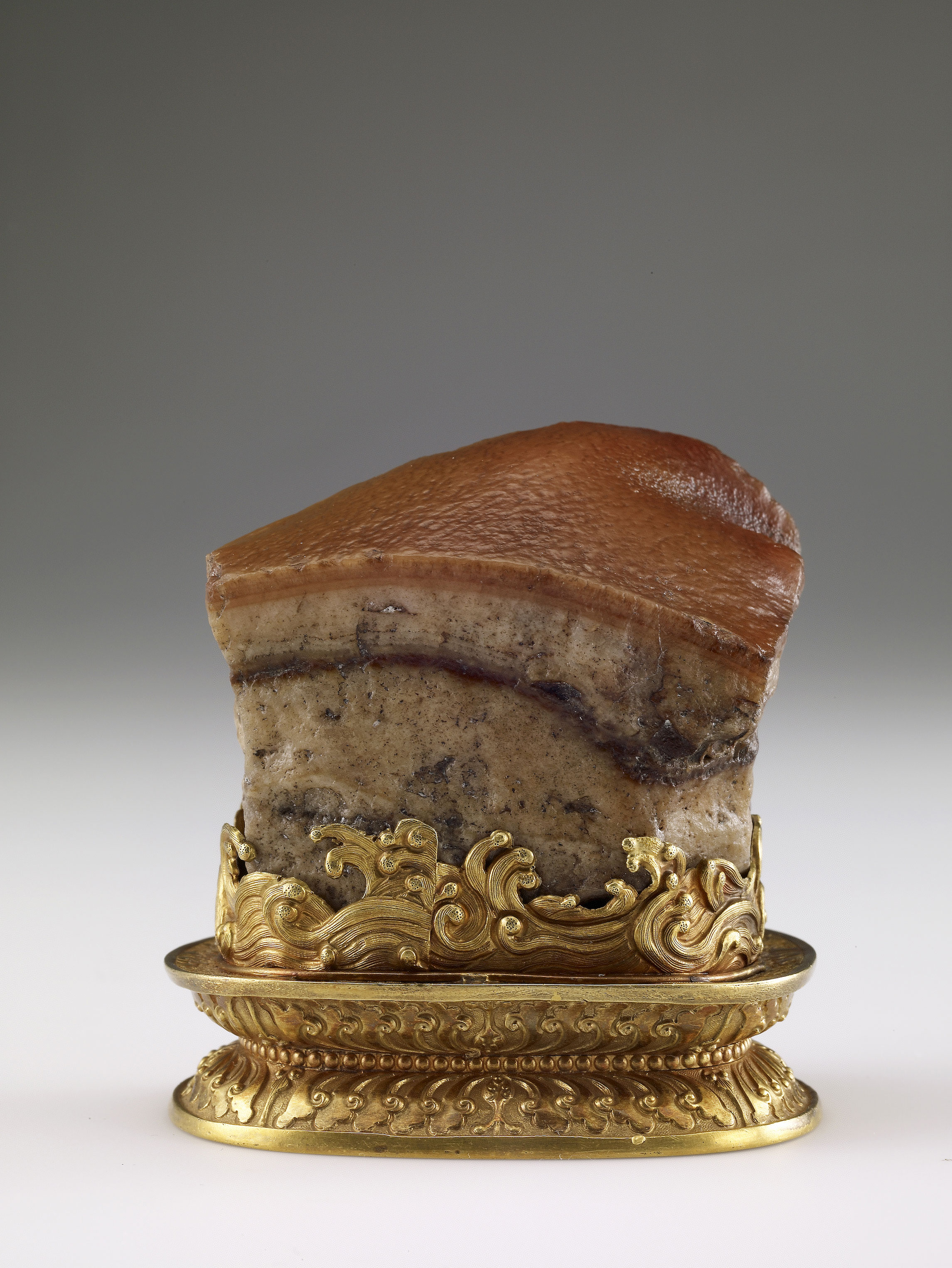

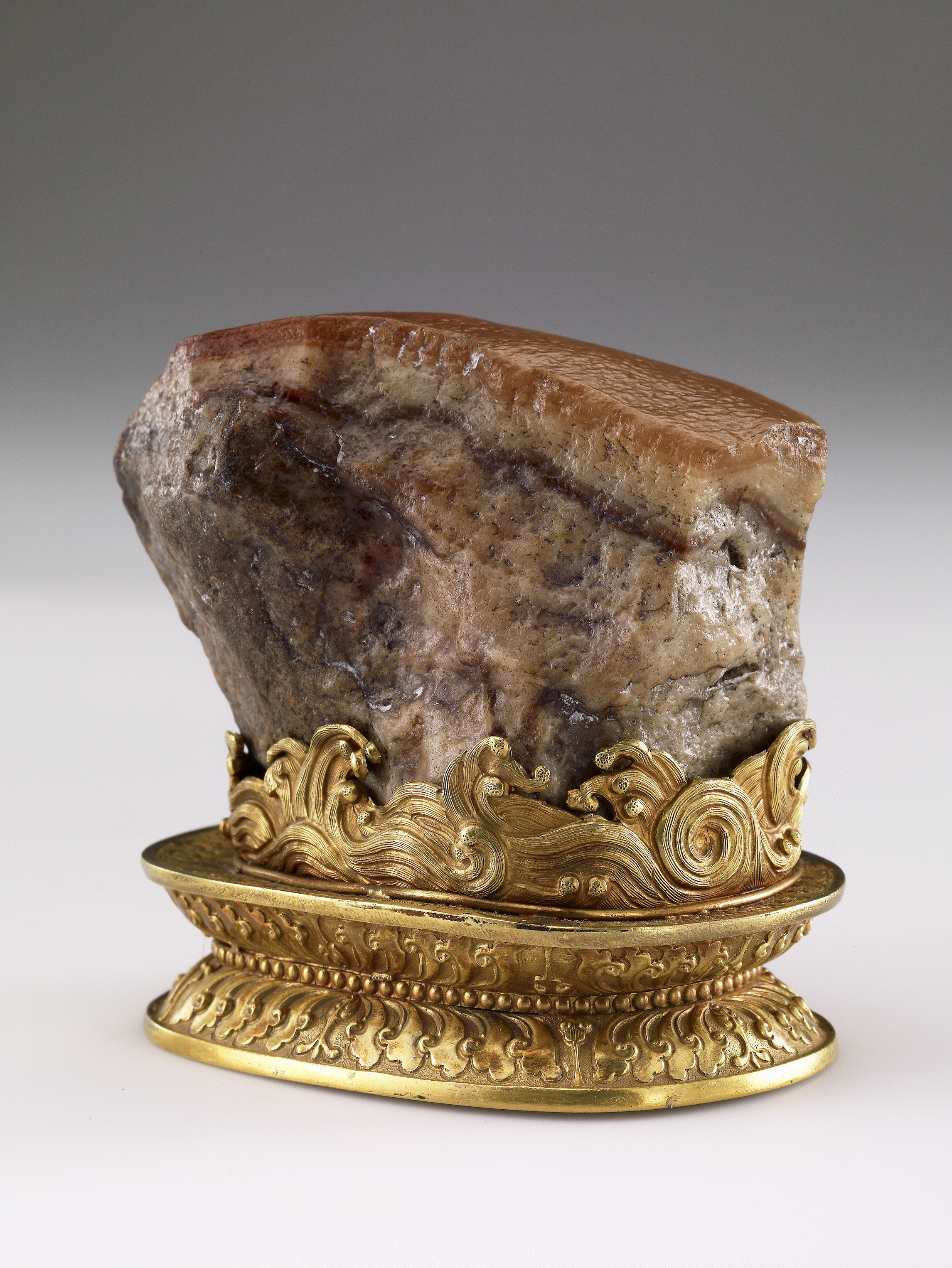

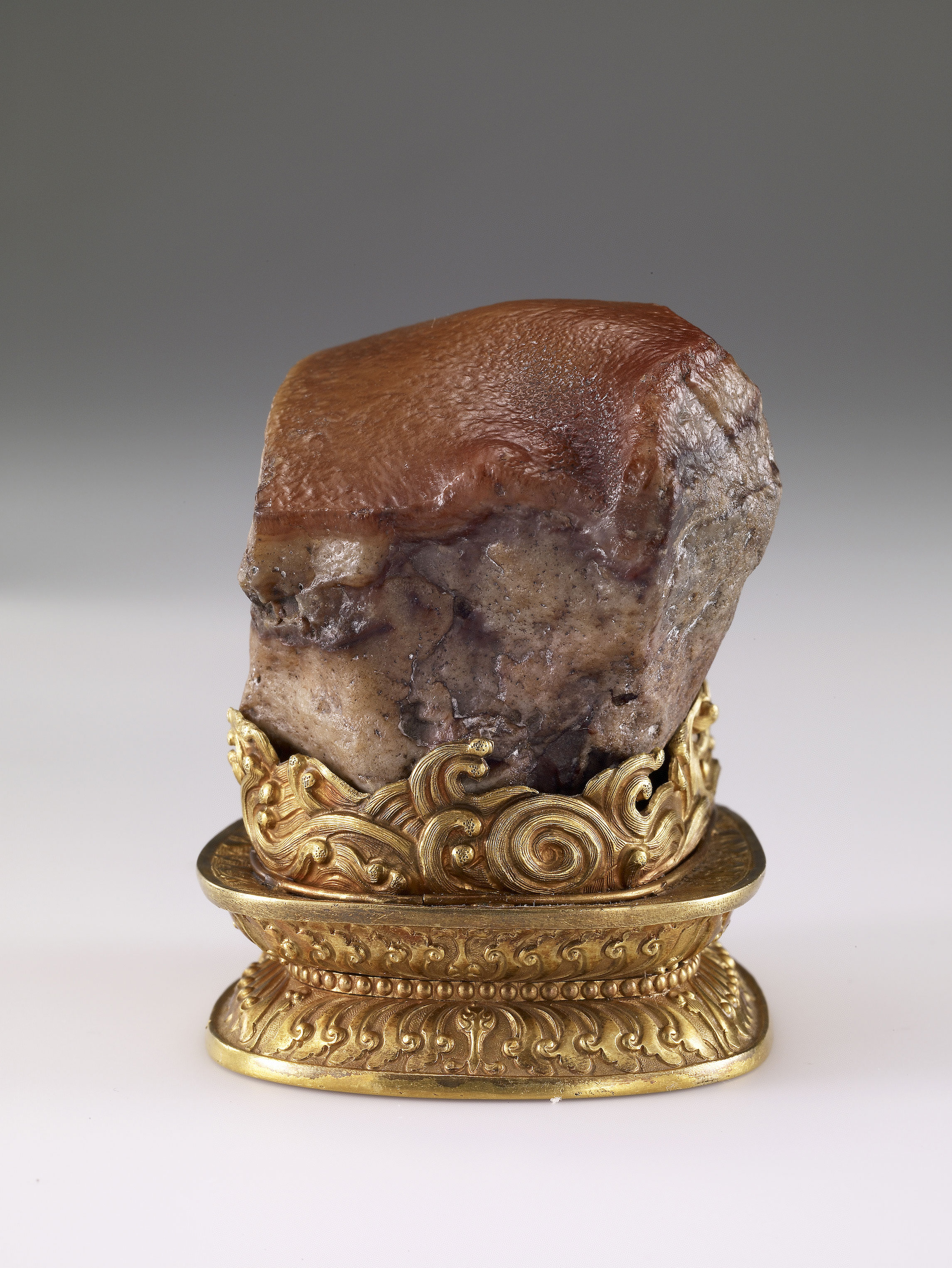

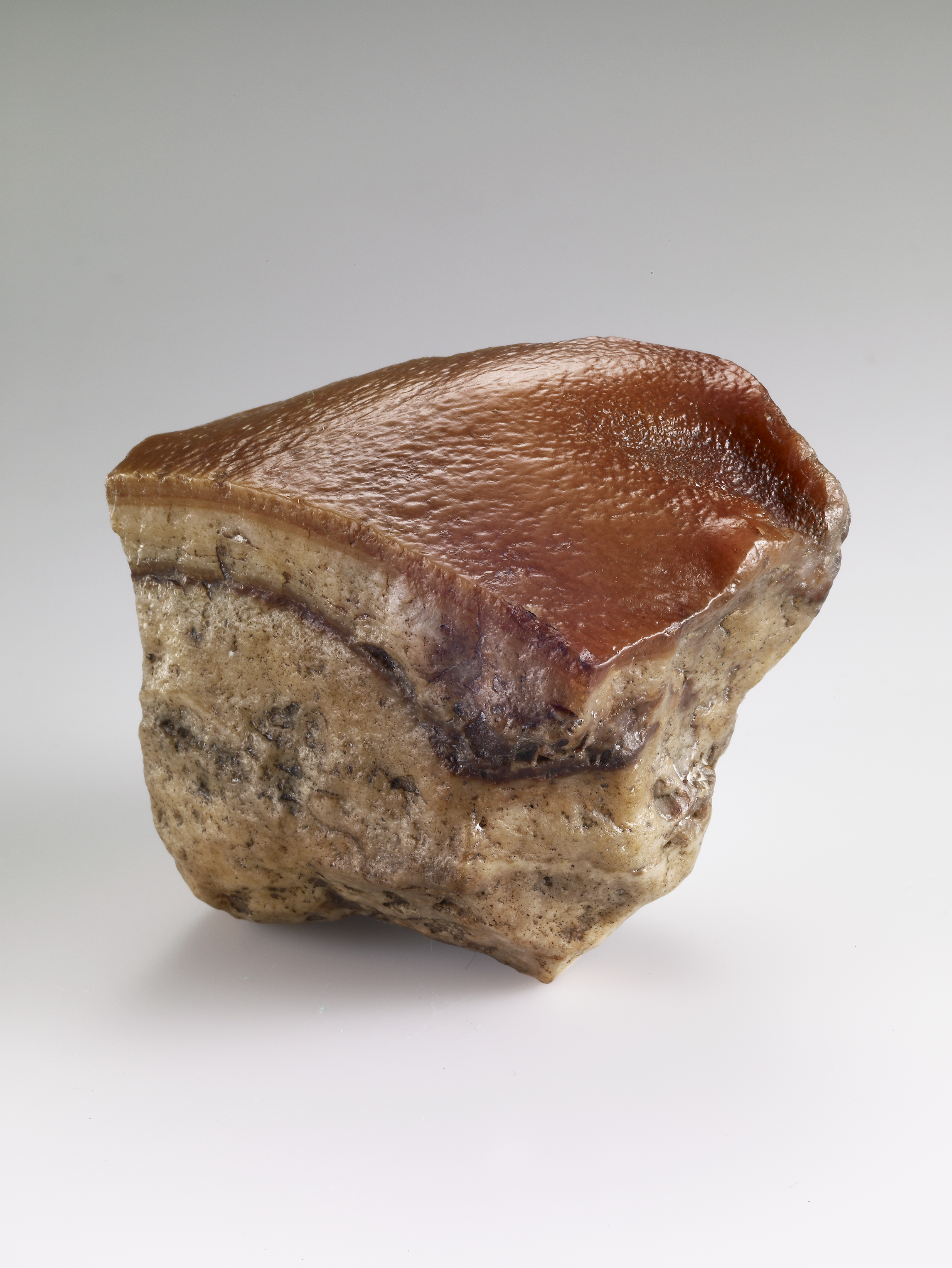

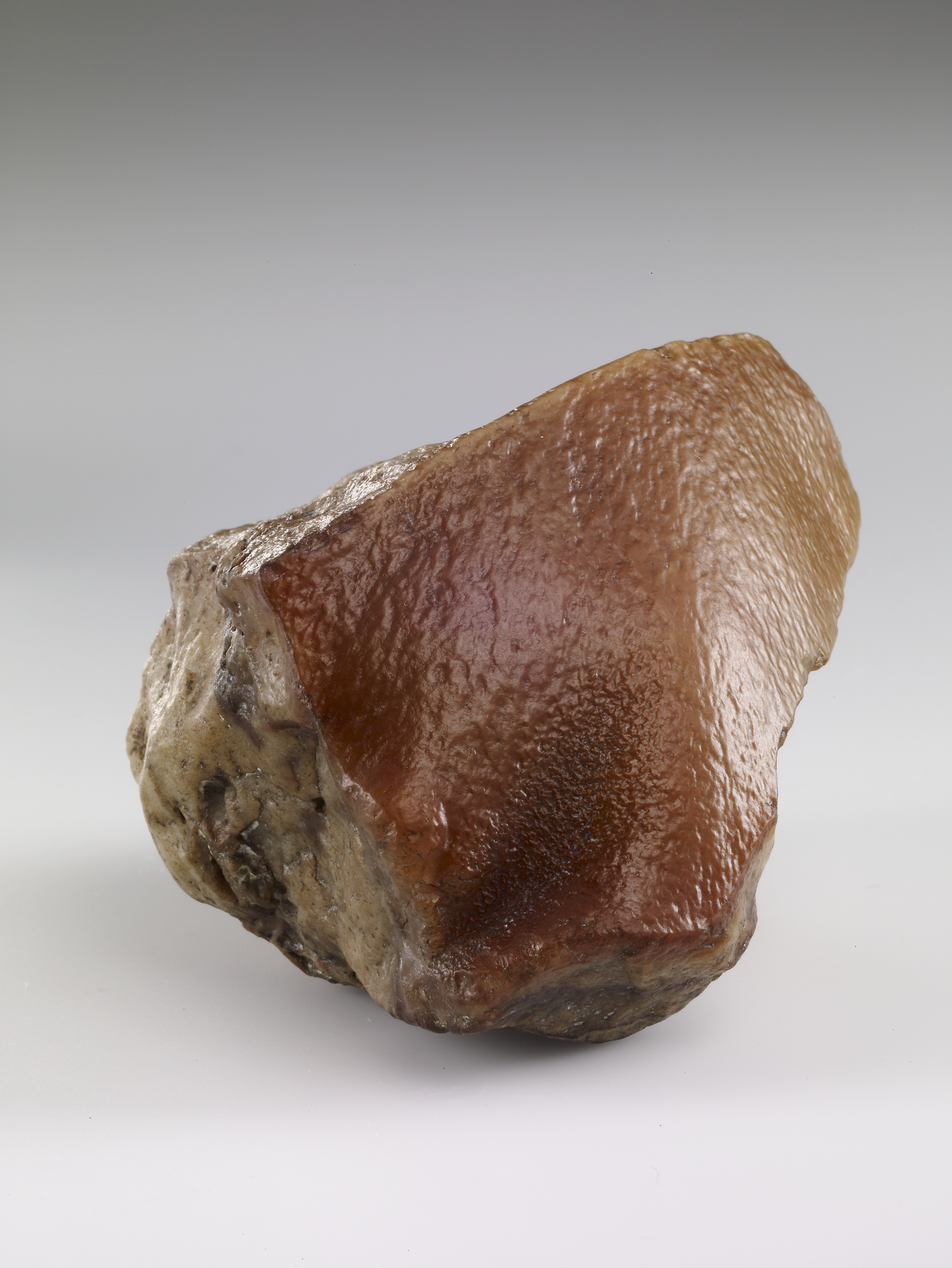

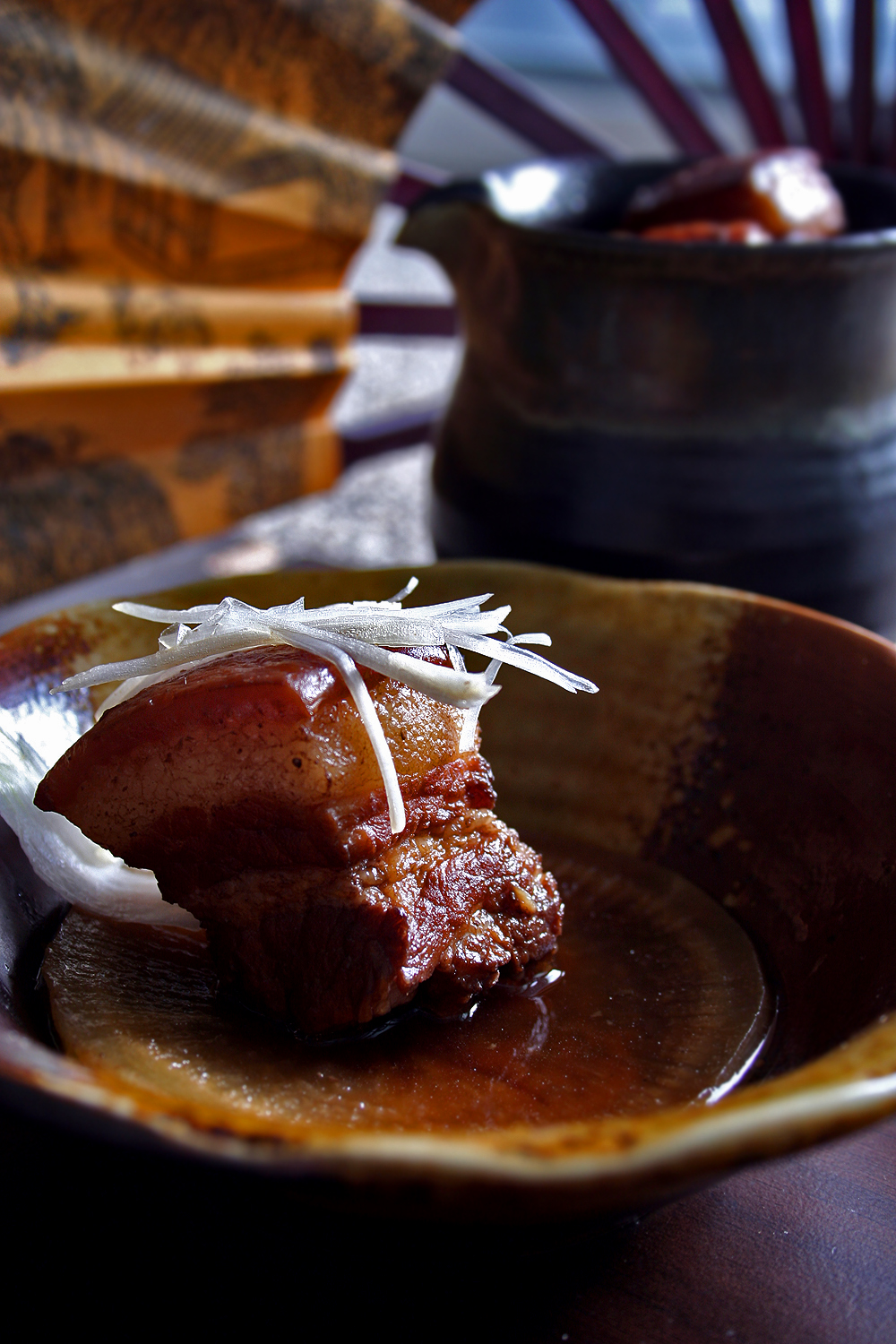
Dongpo pork, the dish the stone depicts

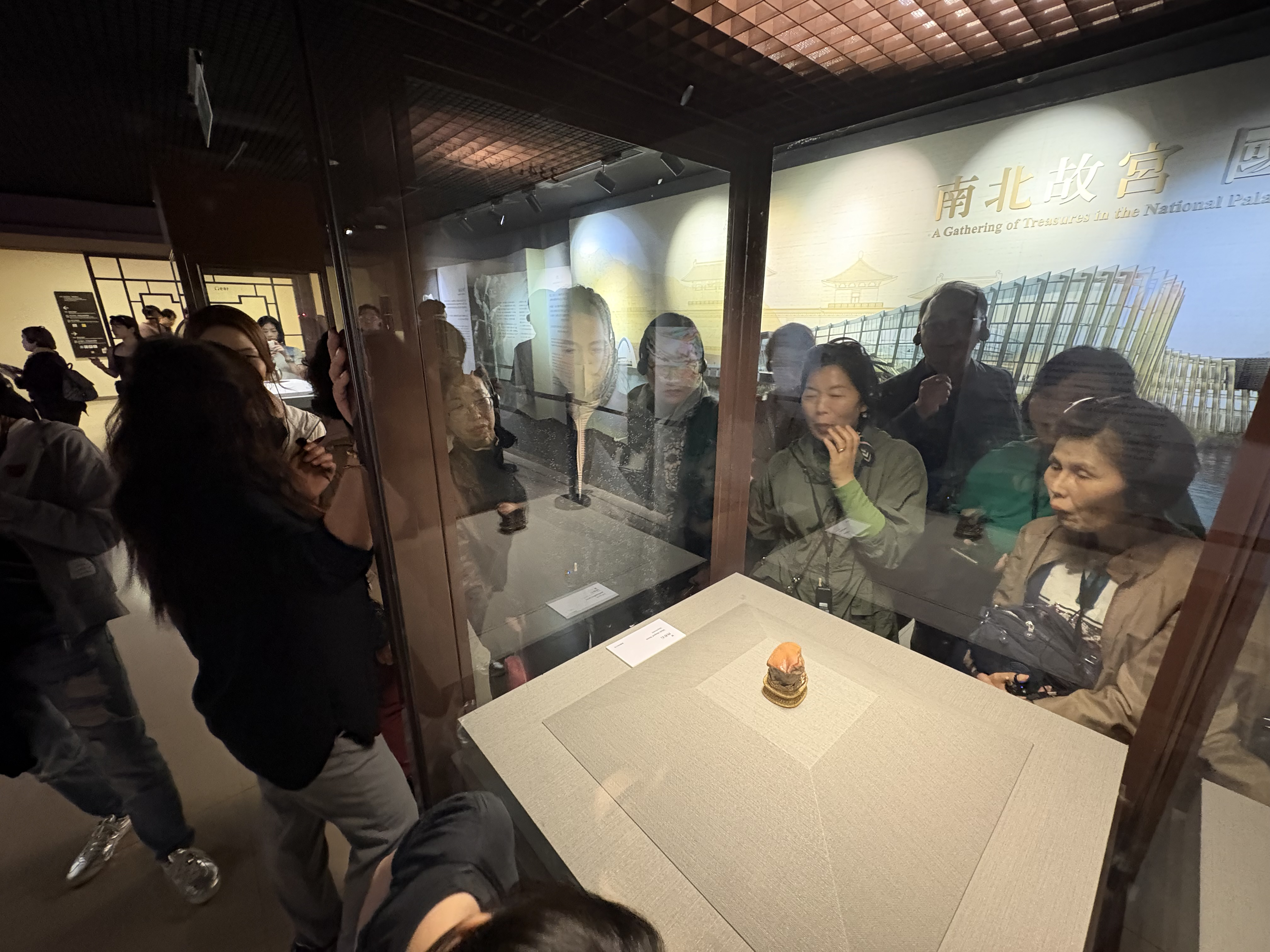
On display in the National Palace Museum, 2025

== See also ==
- List of individual gemstones
