= Mao Gong ding =

Ancient Chinese bronzeware known for its long inscription

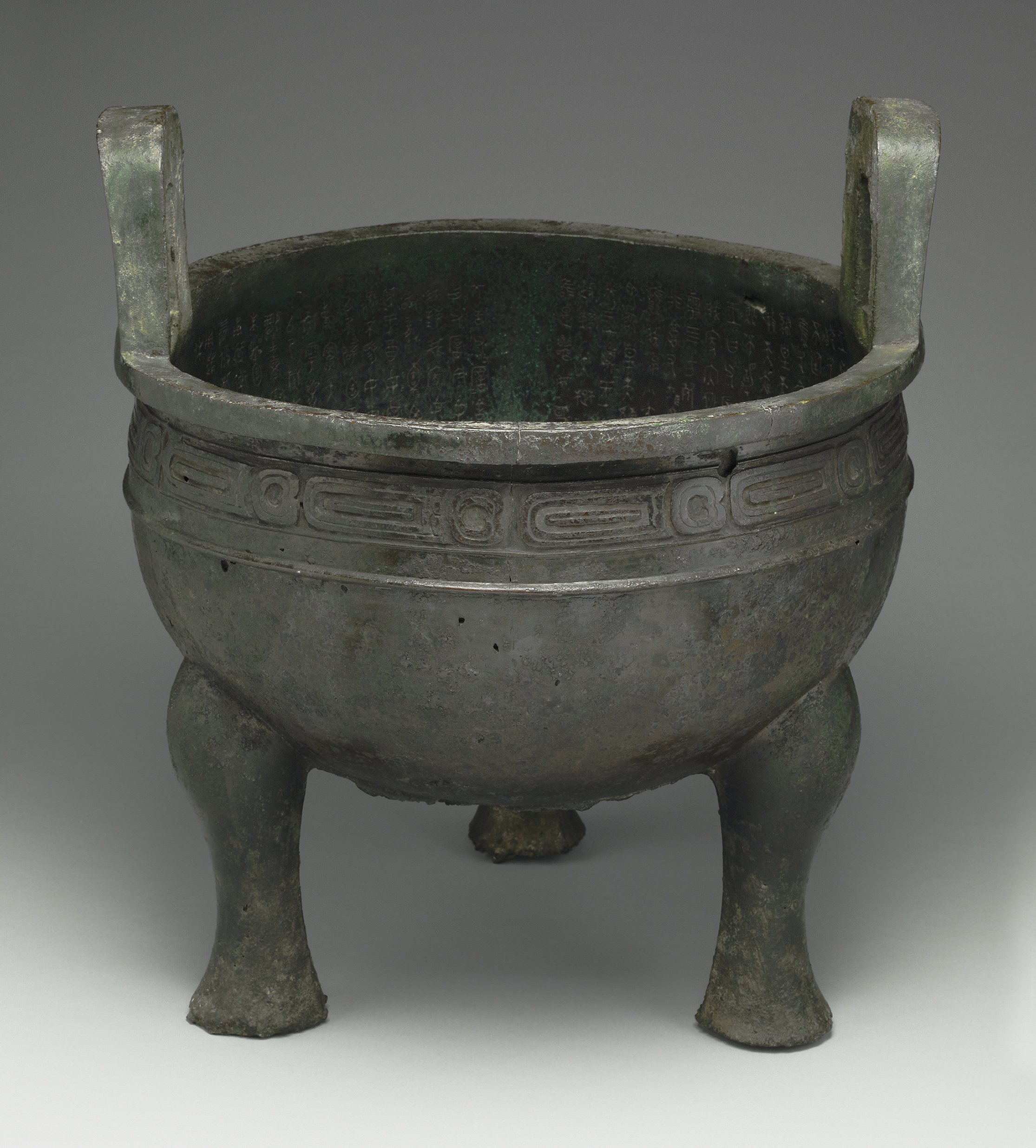
- Material: Bronze
- Height: 53.8 cm (21.2 in)
- Width: 47.9 cm (18.9 in)
- Created: c. 805 BCE
- Discovered: 1843; Shaanxi, China
- Present location: Taipei, Taiwan

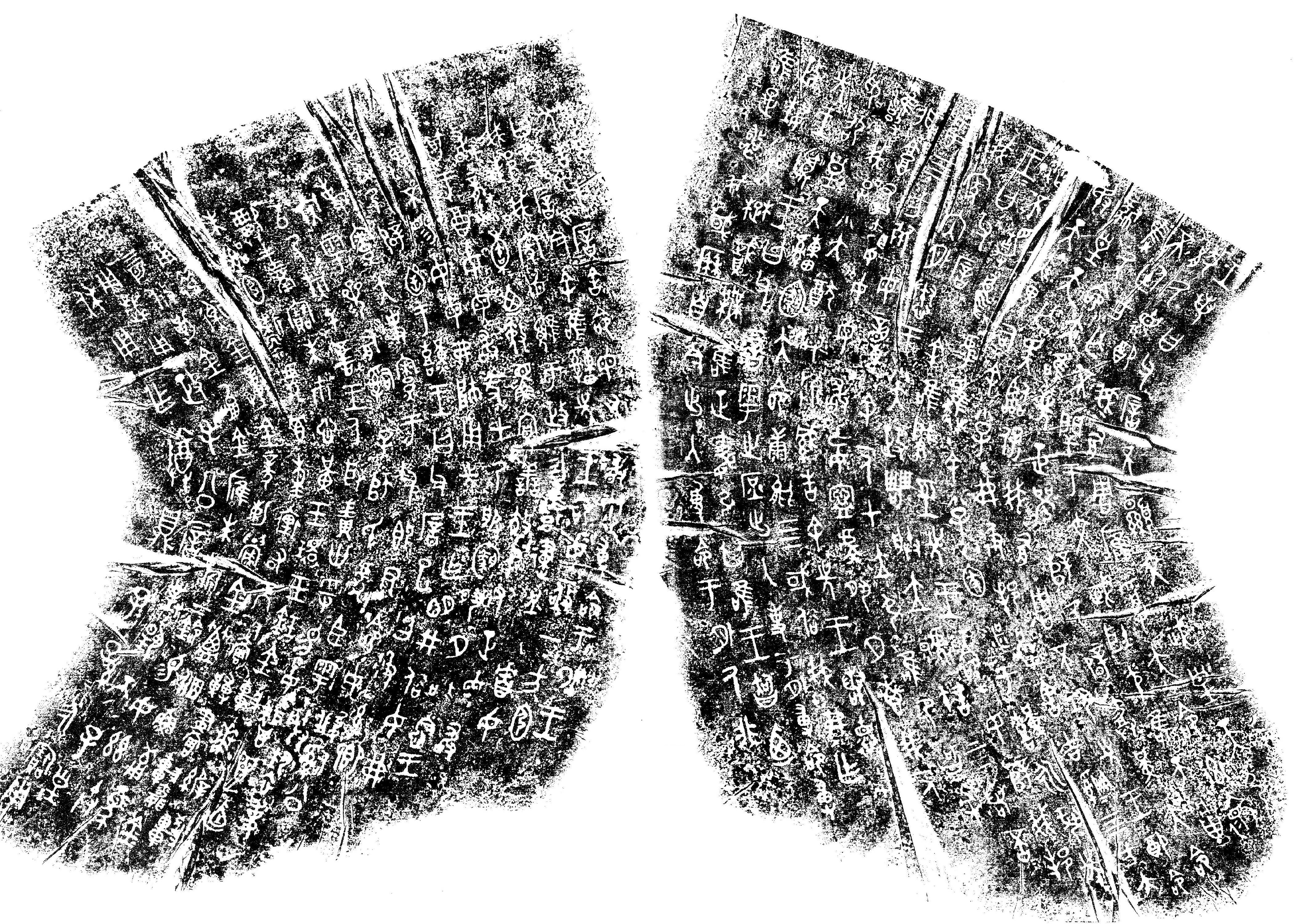
Rubbing of the inscriptions on the vessel

The Mao Gong ding (Chinese: 毛公鼎; pinyin: Máogōng dǐng; lit. 'Lord Mao's cauldron') is a bronze tripod ding vessel from the Western Zhou dynasty (c. 1045 – c. 771 BCE). After the retreat of the government of the Republic of China to Taiwan, it is currently located at the National Palace Museum in Taipei, where it is known as one of the museum's "three treasures", alongside the Jadeite Cabbage and Meat-Shaped Stone. The vessel has an inscription of 500 characters arranged in 32 lines, the longest inscription among the ancient Chinese bronze inscriptions. The ding dates from the reign of King Xuan of Zhou, and was presented to him by the Lord Yin of Mao.

== Description ==
The Mao Gong ding takes its name from the Lord (公 gōng) Yin of Mao, who gifted the ding to the King after being appointed to help run state affairs. The artifact is 53.8 cm high, 47.9 cm wide, and weighs a total of 34.7 kilograms.

The interior surface of the ding is covered in an inscription of 500 characters, the longest such inscription known today. The National Palace Museum summarizes its contents:

The inscription text bears witness to the 'King Xuan restoration' in Western Zhou history [i.e. revitalization after the ascension of King Xuan, ending the Gonghe interregnum]. The first part of the text consists of King Xuan's instructions to the Duke of Mao. The middle portion recounts how the King, upon taking the throne, fondly recalled how the King Wen of Zhou and King Wu of Zhou had enjoyed the Mandate of Heaven and established the kingdom, as well as the King's vigilance and apprehension over inheriting the Mandate himself. The latter part lists in detail the generous gifts the King had bestowed upon the Duke of Mao. In closing, the Duke of Mao expresses his gratitude to the King, and presents the ding as an expression thereof for future generations.

== History ==
The Mao Gong ding was excavated in Qishan County, Shaanxi province in 1843, during the Daoguang Emperor's reign. The famous collector Chen Jieqi (1813–1884) acquired it in 1852. He and his studio made precise rubbings of the inscriptions. In the Xuantong era (1909–1911) Duanfang (1861–1911) bought it from the Chen family.

Ye Gongchuo (1881–1968) was presented with the ding by friends who bought the tripod from the Tianjin Dao Sheng Bank, which had it as a mortgage. During the Second Sino-Japanese War, the Ye family sold it to Chen Yon Ren, a millionaire in Shanghai. In April 1946, Chen Yon Ren donated the tripod to the Kuomintang Shanghai Government through a general in their army. In 1949, Chiang Kai-shek and the Kuomintang moved it to Taiwan, where it remains housed at the National Palace Museum.

== See also ==
- Chinese bronze inscriptions
- Jadeite Cabbage and Meat-shaped Stone
