= Jadeite Cabbage =

Sculpture in the National Palace Museum, Taipei

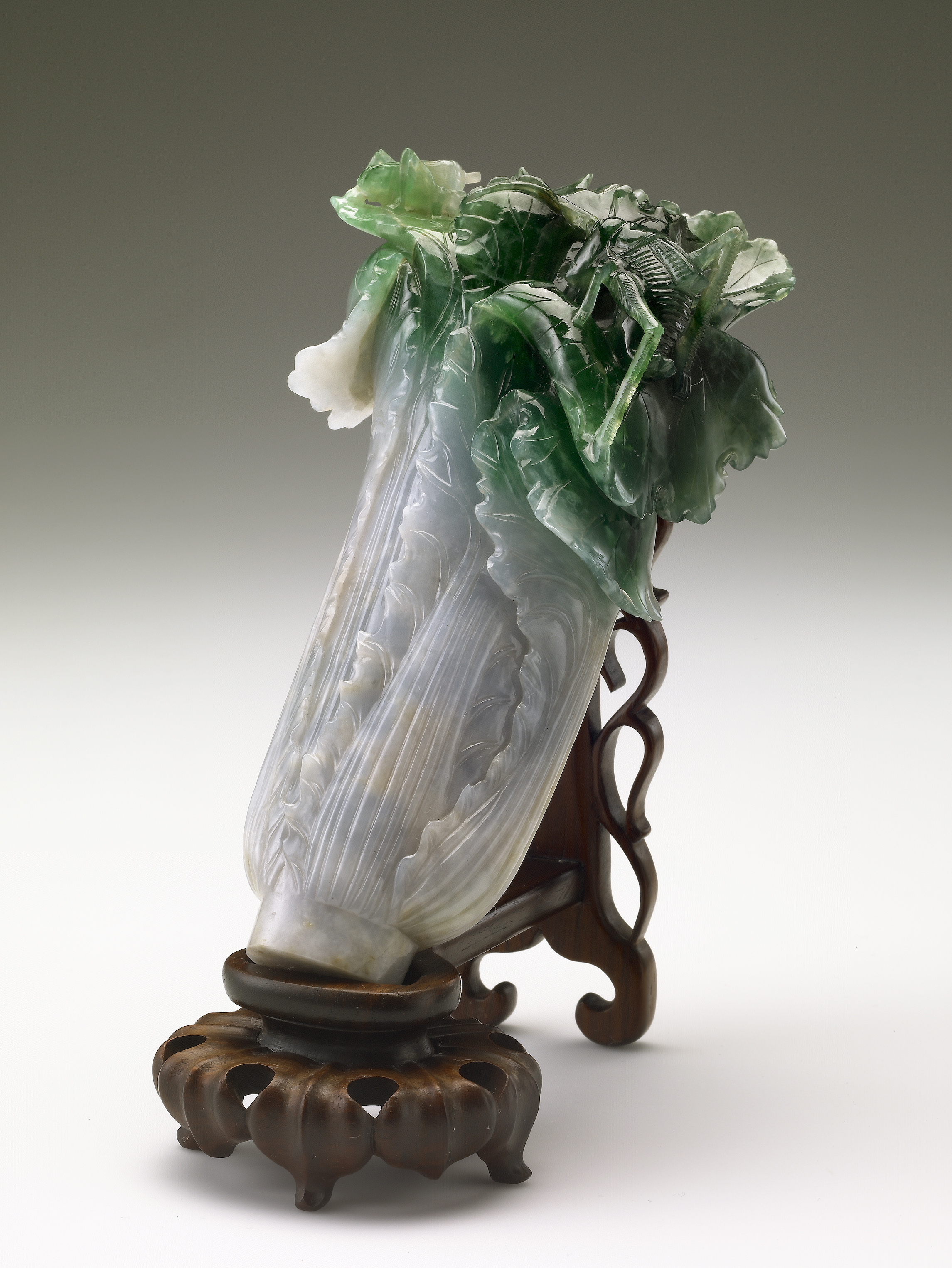
- Artist: Unknown
- Year: 19th century
- Type: Jadeite sculpture
- Dimensions: 18.7 cm × 9.1 cm (7.4 in × 3.6 in)
- Location: National Palace Museum; Taipei

The Jadeite Cabbage (Chinese: 翠玉白菜; pinyin: Cuìyù Báicài; Pe̍h-ōe-jī: Chhùi-ge̍k Pe̍h-chhài) or Jadeite Cabbage with Insects is a piece of jadeite carved into the shape of a napa cabbage head, and with a locust and katydid camouflaged in the leaves. It is part of the collection of the National Palace Museum in Taipei, Taiwan.

Despite its popularity with museum-goers and frequent misrepresentation as a national treasure, it is only designated as a significant antiquity, having less rarity and value than required for categorization as a national treasure under the Cultural Heritage Preservation Act. For example, the Jadeite Cabbage has been called the "most famous masterpiece" of the entire National Palace Museum, and along with the Meat-Shaped Stone and the Mao Gong ding, is today called one of the Three Treasures of the National Palace Museum, a redesignation from several less accessible, infrequently-displayed works. It has also been chosen by the public as the most important item in the museum's entire collection.

== Description ==
The Jadeite Cabbage is a relatively small sculpture. Measuring only 18.7 by 9.1 centimetres (7.4 by 3.6 in) and is 5.07 centimetres (2.00 in) thick, it is "hardly larger than a human hand".

The ruffled semi-translucent appearance of the leaves is due to the combination of various natural colors of the jade to recreate the color variations of a real cabbage. The figure was carved from a single piece of half-white, half-green jadeite which contained numerous imperfections such as cracks and discolored blotches. These flaws were incorporated into the sculpture and became the veins in the cabbage's stalks and leaves.

The sculpture has been considered an allegory of female virtue with the white stalk symbolizing purity, the leaves denoting fertility and abundance, and the locust and katydid representing children. However, further studies have proven that this interpretation is incorrect with regard to the katydid. There is a poem about an insect "zhongsi" in the Book of Poetry. This insect has been used metaphorically as an auspicious symbol for having many children and grandchildren in Chinese culture. Based on the interpretations of this poem and entomological analyses, this "zhongsi" is very likely a migratory locust. The size of the locust on the Jadeite Cabbage is too small to be identified as a migratory locust. However, this "katydid" is definitely a Chinese bush cricket (Gampsocleis gratiosa) which is not the "zhongsi" of the Book of Poetry. In fact, the Chinese bush cricket is a singing insect artificially raised and used during the Qing dynasty for entertaining guests at the palace banquet. Consequently, this insect cannot be considered as a fertility symbol.

== History ==
The sculptor of the Jadeite Cabbage is not known. It was first displayed in the Forbidden City's Yonghe Palace, the residence of the Qing Empire's Guangxu Emperor's Consort Jin, who probably received it as part of her dowry for her wedding to Guangxu in 1889. Following the fall of the Qing dynasty in the 1911 Revolution, the sculpture became part of the collection of the Palace Museum in the Forbidden City. Along with a core of that collection, the piece survived the Second Sino-Japanese War (World War II) and the Chinese Civil War; it was eventually relocated to Taiwan's National Palace Museum during the retreat of the government of the Republic of China to Taiwan.

== See also ==
- List of individual gemstones
- Glass Flowers
