= Okazuya =

Japanese-style delicatessen in Hawaii

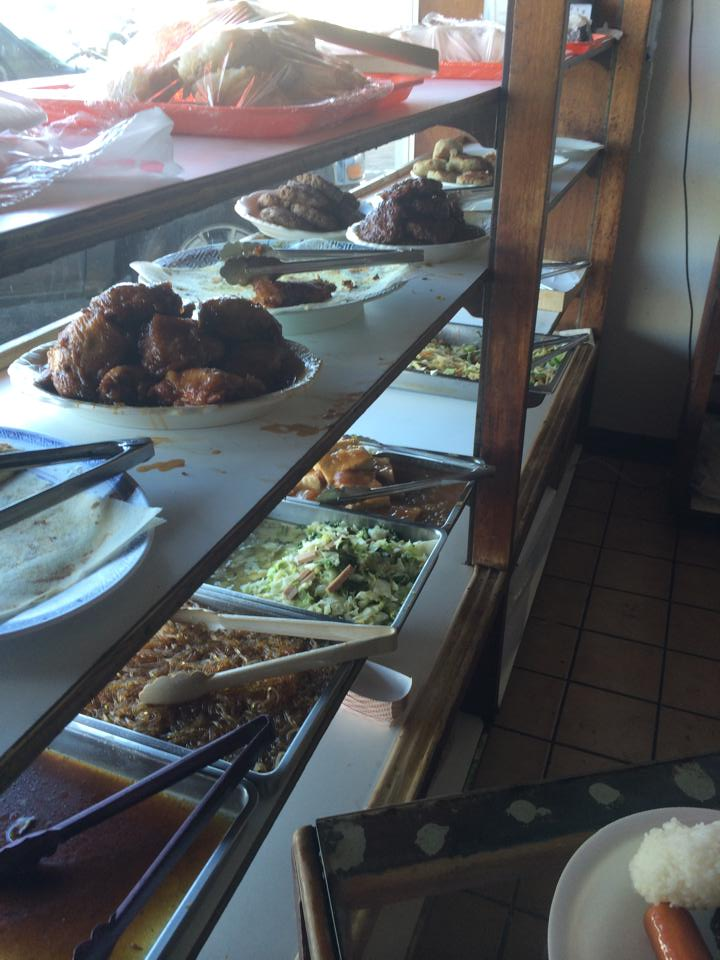
Window display of okazu offerings

Okazuya (御菜屋 or おかずや) or okazu-ya are a Japanese-style delicatessen common in Hawaii. "Okazu" refers to a side dish to accompany rice, while "ya" refers to a retail establishment. In Hawaii, an okazuya offers an array of okazu, food items that are sold à la carte, often by the piece, which can be combined to create a meal. Many of the dishes may also be offered in the form of ready-to-go bento. It is often considered the precursor to the plate lunch.

== History ==
The idea of the okazuya was a result of Japanese and Ryukyuans immigration in the late 1800s. Thousands came to Hawaii to work as contract laborers in the fruit and sugar plantations. While men labored in the plantation fields, women were doing household jobs such as cooking. Many of these women would eventually sell their cooked dishes to other plantation workers for additional income. These establishments were essential in the daily lives of immigrants, particularly for bachelors who did not have the resources or knowledge to cook for themselves. Although the local okazuya derive its name and recipes from Japan and Ryukyu Islands, they are still considered very much Hawaiian. Many of the okazuya that exists today were started by Ryukyuans who retired from plantation work in the 1940s.

Numerous okazuya are standalone take-out shops or attached to another family business like a neighborhood grocery store, but there are a few that have a dining area or have an adjoining restaurant. Older okazuya have typically remained a family business passed down from generation-to-generation. Consequently, the challenges of multigenerational establishments have forced several to close when family members choose other careers. Much of the work is done manually, requiring 18 hours a day. Each of the main Hawaiian Islands has an okazuya. Oahu had as many as forty-two okazuya in 2000, but that number has decreased to less than half by 2022. The oldest existing okazuya on Oahu is Sekiya's which was opened in 1935. One of the oldest in Hawaii was Nagasako Okazu-ya Deli in Lahaina, Maui, opened in the early 1900s before it was destroyed in the 2023 Hawaii wildfires.

== Okazu dishes ==
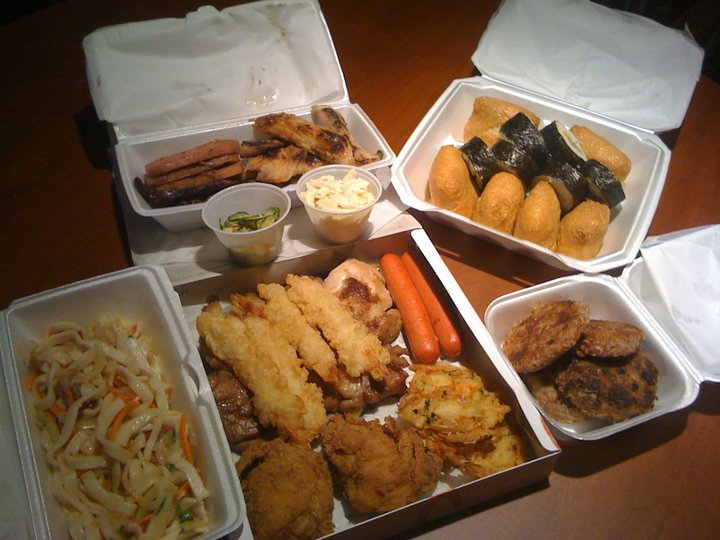
Various standard okazu items

Numerous okazuya proprietors and workers typically start very early in the morning to prepare the okazu before opening the shop in order to target customers who purchase lunch before the start of the workday. As a result, several dishes are sold at room temperature, although a few okazuya have modernized with equipment such as food warmers. These dishes are often displayed to patrons on the window front or counter (sometimes without prices). Very few remain open past lunchtime. While many okazuya offer traditional and similar fare, ingredients and preparation of okazu can vary greatly from one shop to another. "Fried chicken" at one shop may consist of battered boneless chicken thighs while another uses panko bone-in chicken wings.

As suggested by the name, okazu are dishes that are eaten with rice. Thus, many are characteristically salty or salty-sweet, with partial use of shōyu (soy sauce) and mirin (sweet cooking wine) as ingredients. Several of these dishes were a result of fusion cuisine, adapted to the ingredients and tastes of the time. Okazuya-style chow fun is simpler than Chinese chow fun and is a common substitution for onigiri (rice). A "potato hash" (or "hash patty"), sometimes containing small amounts of canned corned beef, are described as pan-fried potato croquettes without panko. The Okinawan dish rafute is pork belly simmered in shōyu sweetened with sugar. This popular concept was applied to dishes like chicken and hot dogs which were widely available and affordable, now known today as "shoyu chicken" and "shoyu hot dog" respectively. Tamagoyaki often include SPAM, hot dogs, or fishcake.

In the present day, several okazuya have included in their offerings modern local-Japanese fusion dishes such as "chicken katsu," "furikake chicken," "garlic chicken," and non-Japanese foods such as Chinese stir-fries including chow mein, Filipino adobo, Korean kalbi, Hawaiian poke, and American steak.

=== Rice and noodles ===
- Onigiri - rice balls seasoned with salt, sometimes sprinkled with furikake, wrapped with nori, or stuffed with an umeboshi
- Musubi - onigiri with meat such as SPAM, Goteborg sausage, or hot dog
- Cone sushi - inari sushi using larger abura-age pockets
- Futomaki - or "maki roll," a rolled sushi containing cucumber, parcooked carrots, tamagoyaki, kampyo, and hana ebi (powdered dried shrimp)
- Chow fun - flat wheat noodles stir-fried with vegetables
- Fried saimin - stir-fried saimin noodles similar to yakisoba
- Long rice - starch noodles simmered with soy sauce

=== Vegetable side dishes ===
- Kinpira gobo - braised burdock in sweetened soy sauce
- Namasu - pickled vegetables, typically thinly sliced cucumbers, carrots, and daikon
- Shira ae - salad of mashed tofu and vegetables
- Okara (unohana) - simmered soybean pulp with vegetables
- Kabocha - braised Japanese pumpkin nimono in sweetened soy sauce
- Potato salad - potatoes mixed with vegetables in mayonnaise
- Macaroni salad - macaroni, or other pasta, mixed with mayonnaise, sometimes with canned tuna

=== Fried items ===
- Tempura - deep-fried battered shrimp, fish, or vegetables
- Fried chicken - deep-fried chicken thighs karaage style or in mochiko batter
- Fish cake - deep-fried fish croquettes made from surimi, sometimes stuffed with hard-boiled egg or hot dog
- Korokke - or "hash balls," deep-fried potato croquettes in batter or panko

=== Simmered items ===
- Nishime - simmered mixed vegetables, sometimes with chicken or pork
- Shoyu - pork, chicken, or hot dog simmered in soy sauce and sugar

=== Grilled ===
- Potato hash patty - potato croquettes sometimes seasoned with corned beef
- Tamagoyaki - egg omelette sometimes mixed with vegetables or meats
- Teriyaki - thinly sliced beef, boneless chicken thighs, meatballs or hamburger steak grilled and glazed with teriyaki sauce
- Tofu patty - a fish cake made with mashed tofu and canned tuna or salmon
- Fish - ʻahi, mahi mahi, saba, or salmon
- Luncheon meats - SPAM, hot dog, ham

== See also ==
- Bento – Japanese-style single-portion meal
- Okazu – Japanese food side dish
- Plate lunch – Quintessentially Hawaiian meal
- Meat and three – Meal format in the southern United States
- Japanese cuisine
- Cuisine of Hawaii – Food and drinks from Hawaii
- Okinawan cuisine – Cuisine of Okinawa Prefecture, Japan

== Bibliography ==
- Nabarrete, Zoe; Hookala, Cat (January 1, 2007). Hawaii's Lunchbox (Okazu) & Family Recipes. Morris Press Cookbooks. ISBN 0615230660.
