= Dongpo pork =

Chinese fried braised pork dish

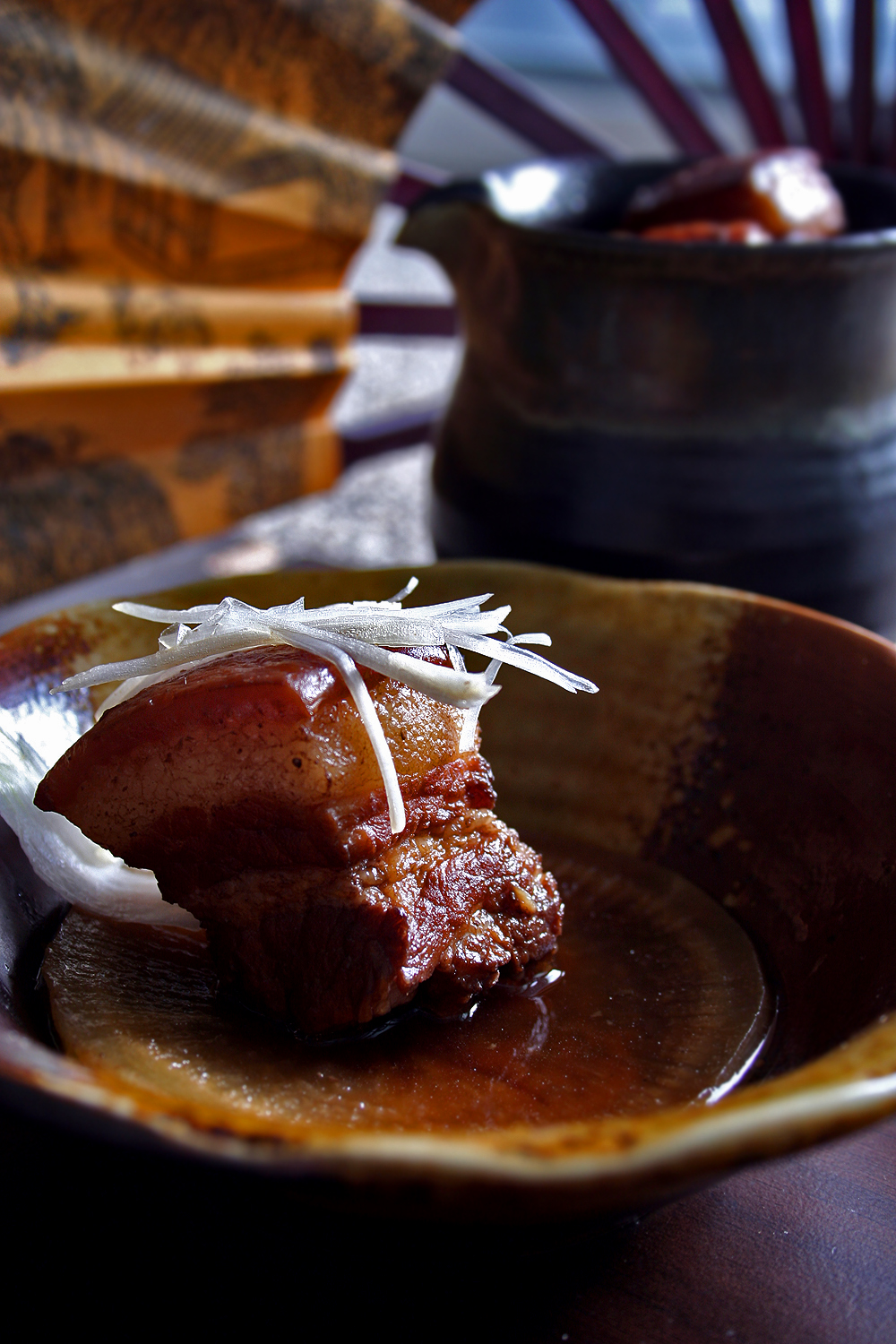
- Place of origin: China
- Region or state: Hangzhou
- Associated cuisine: Chinese cuisine, Hangzhou cuisine
- Main ingredients: Pork belly
- Ingredients generally used: Soy sauce, brown sugar, rice wine
- Similar dishes: Kakuni, Rafute

Dongpo pork (simplified Chinese: 东坡肉; traditional Chinese: 東坡肉; pinyin: dōngpōròu), also known as Dongpo meat, is a Hangzhou dish made by pan-frying and then red-cooking pork belly. The pork is typically cut into thick, approximately five-centimetre (two-inch) squares, with an even distribution of fat and lean meat, whilst retaining the skin. The texture is tender and juicy without being excessively greasy, accompanied by a fragrant aroma of wine. The dish is named in honor of Su Dongpo (Su Shi), a distinguished Song Dynasty poet and gastronome.

== History ==
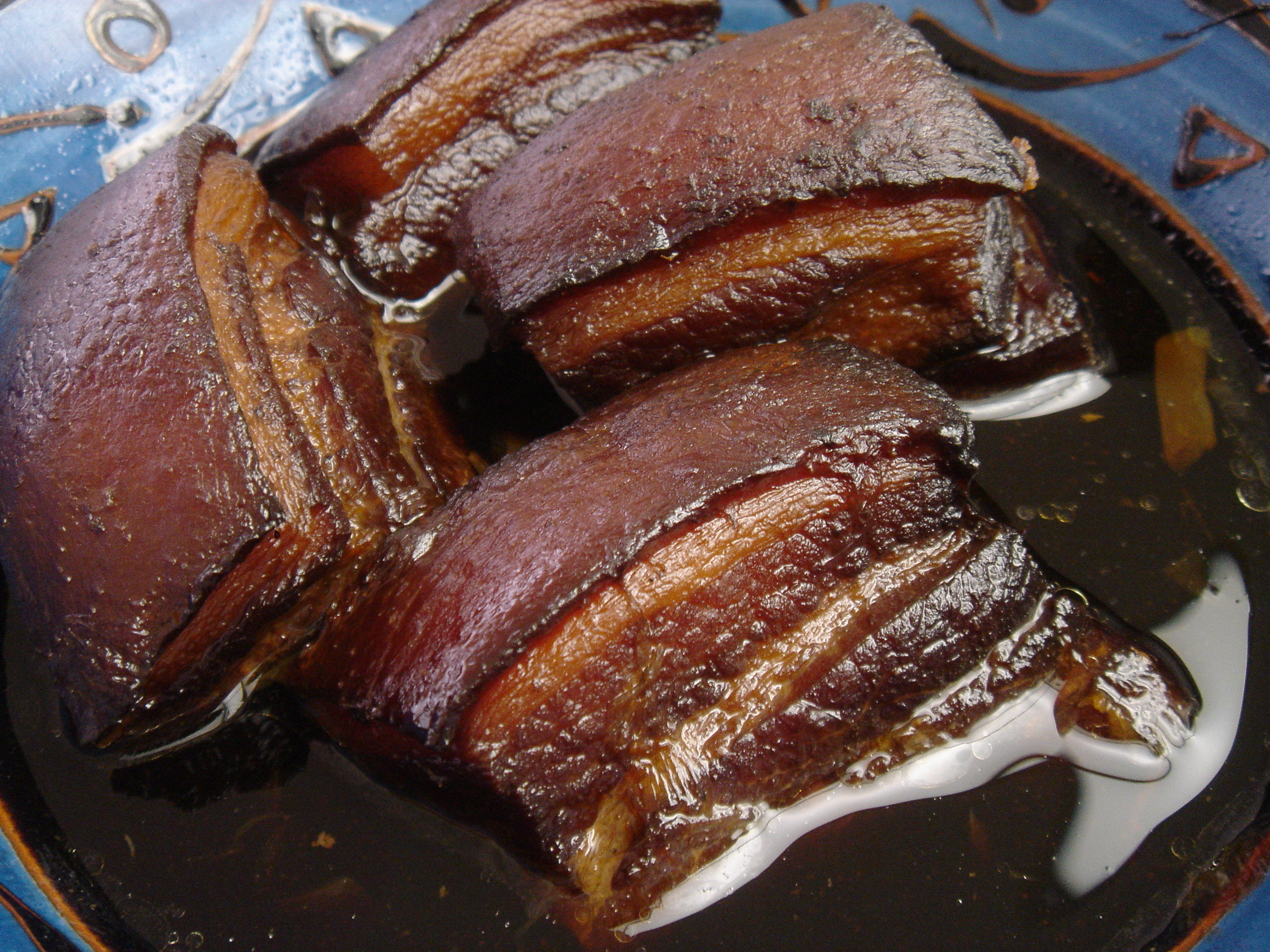
Dongpo pork braised in soy sauce and rice wine

According to legend, while facing financial hardship during his exile in Huangzhou following the Crow Terrace Poetry Trial, Su Shi (aka Su Dongpo) innovated upon the conventional method of preparing pork. He marinated the pork in a mixture of huangjiu (yellow wine), rock sugar, and soy sauce, and simmered it on low heat for a few hours. He also composed a poem titled "Ode to Pork", where he described that pork was the most affordable meat source locally, and by using a slow cooking method, he obtained both a delicacy and a survival food. The recipe was subsequently adopted and developed by the people in the Hangzhou area, the capital city of South Song Dynasty.

In Chinese Gastronomy, Lin Hsiang Ju and Lin Tsuifeng included the recipe of "The Fragrance of Pork: Tungpo Pork (Another name for Dongpo pork)", and remarked that the "square of fat is named after Su Tungpo, the poet, for unknown reasons. Perhaps it is just because he would have liked it."

== Culture ==
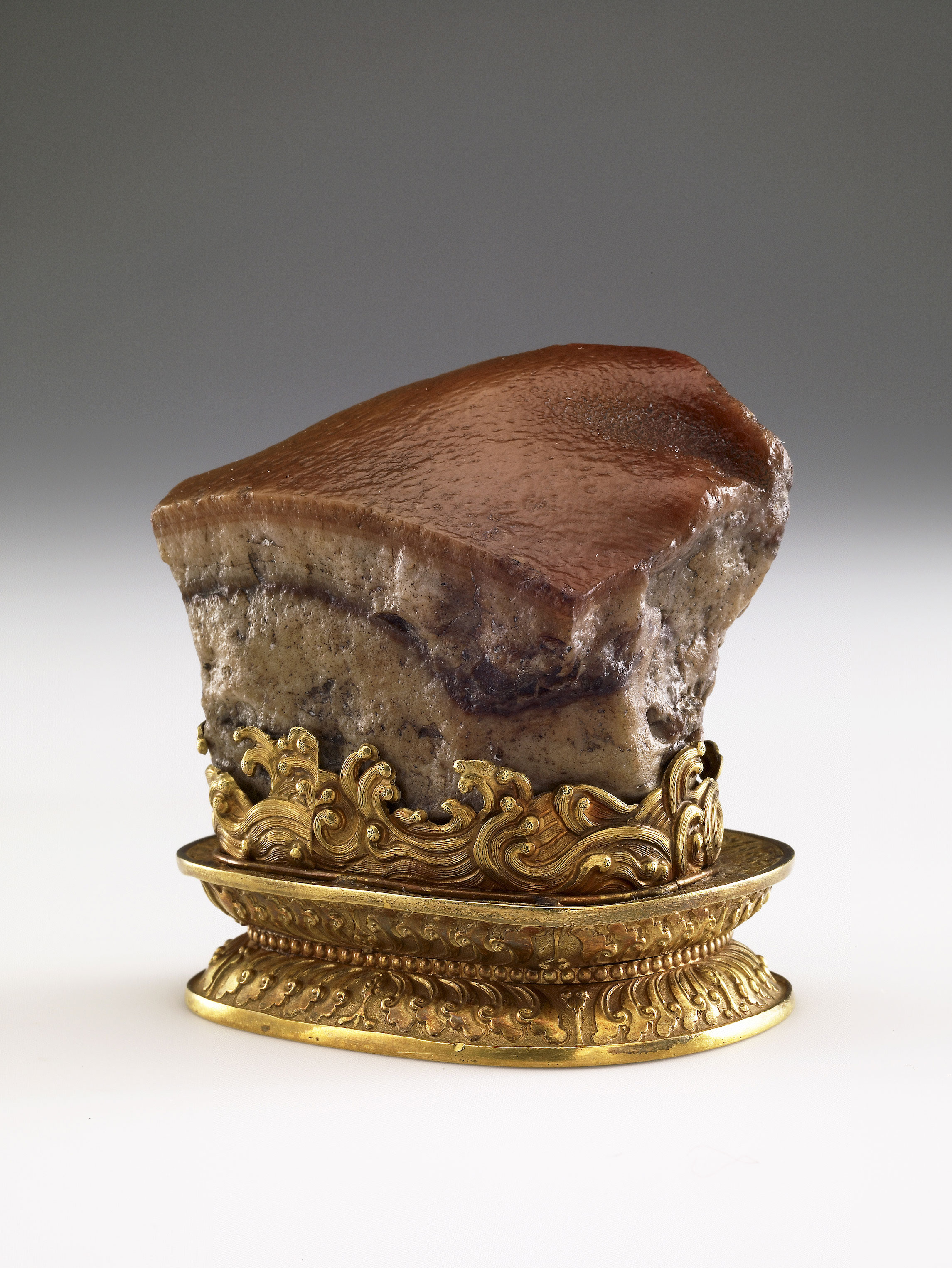
The Meat-Shaped Stone, carved during the Qing dynasty to resemble Dongpo pork

Dongpo pork is the subject of a famous piece of art, the Meat-Shaped Stone, which was carved out of jasper to resemble braised meat. The dish is also related to Japanese kakuni, and the Okinawan rafute.

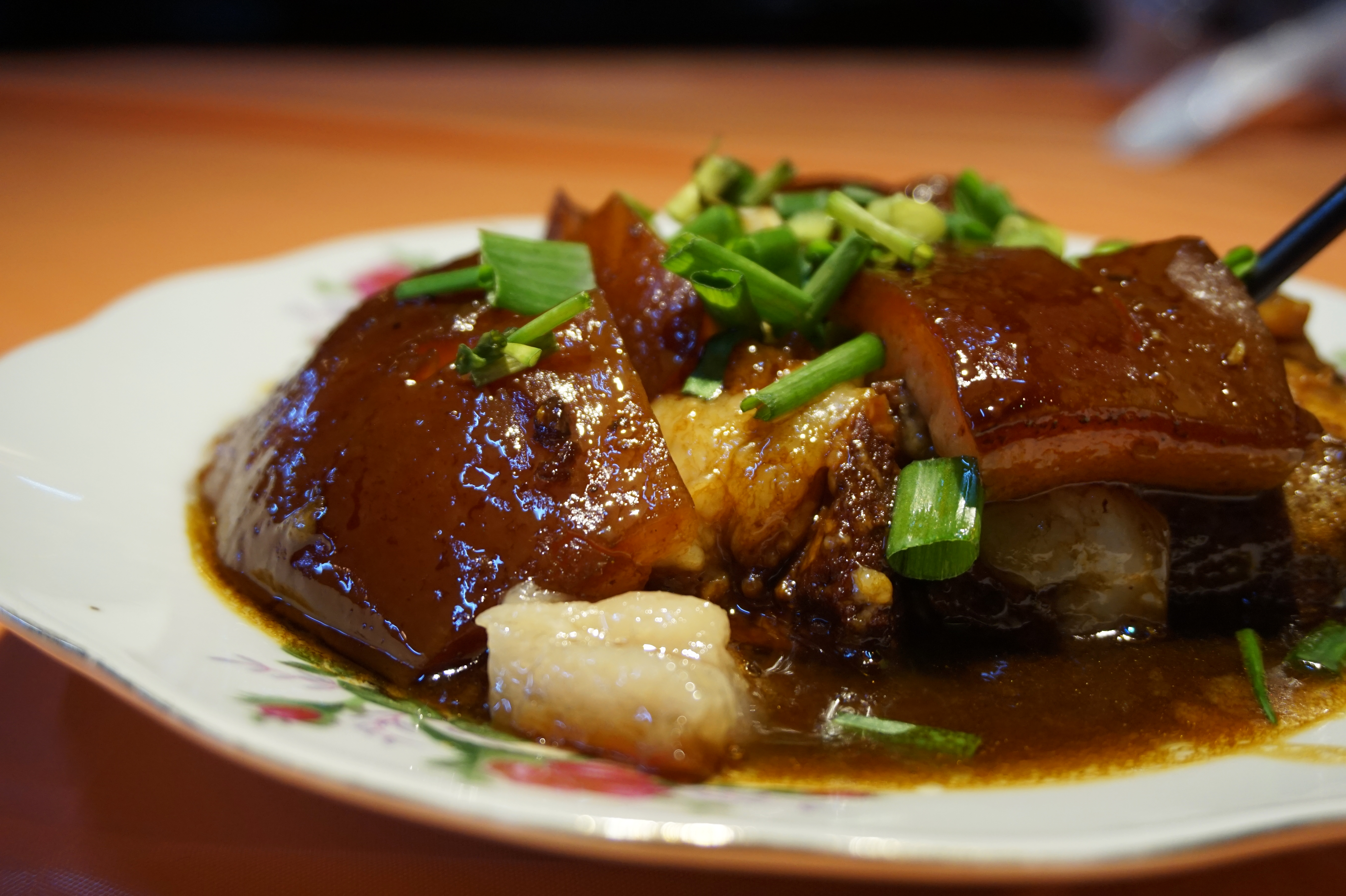

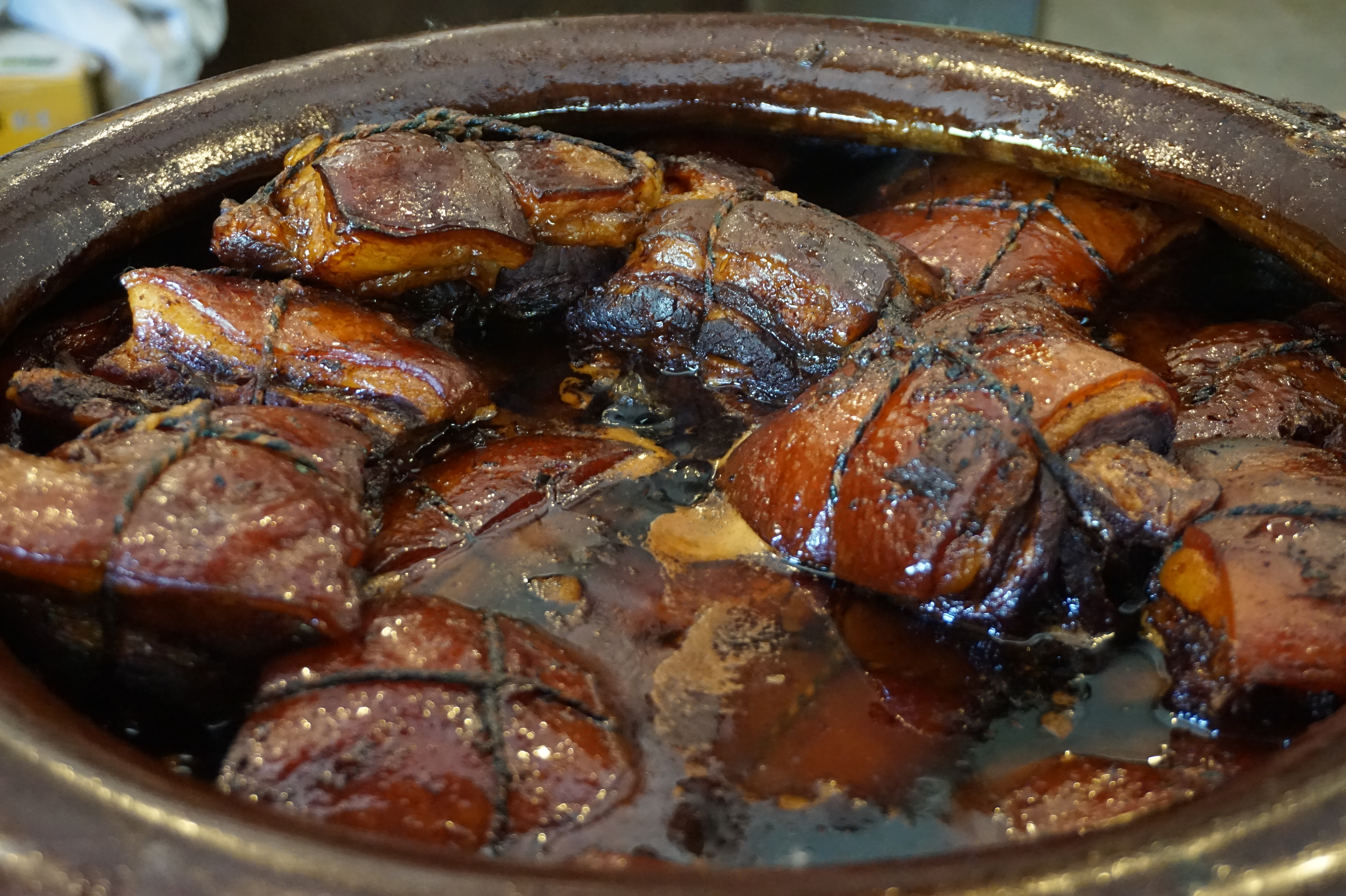

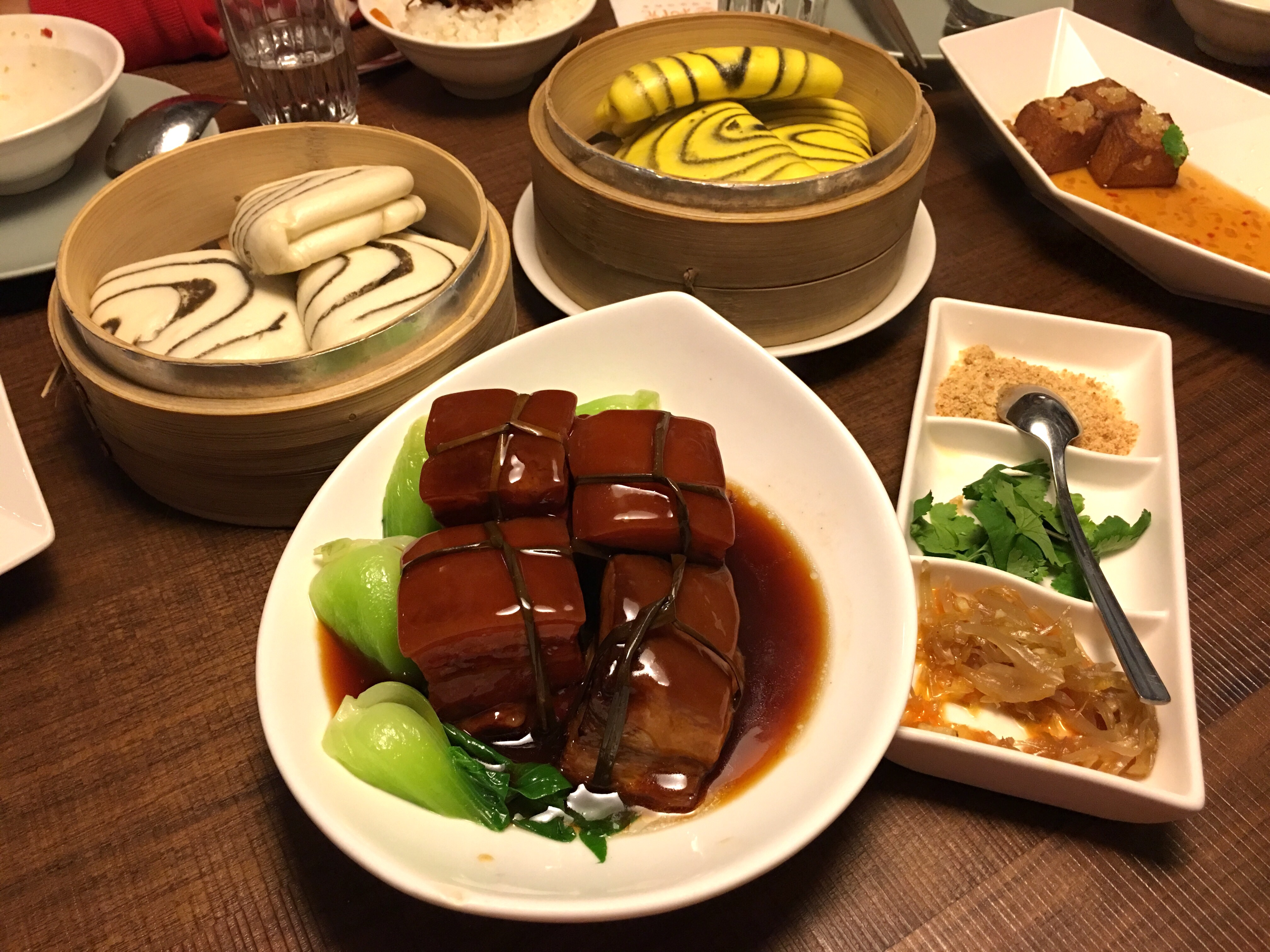

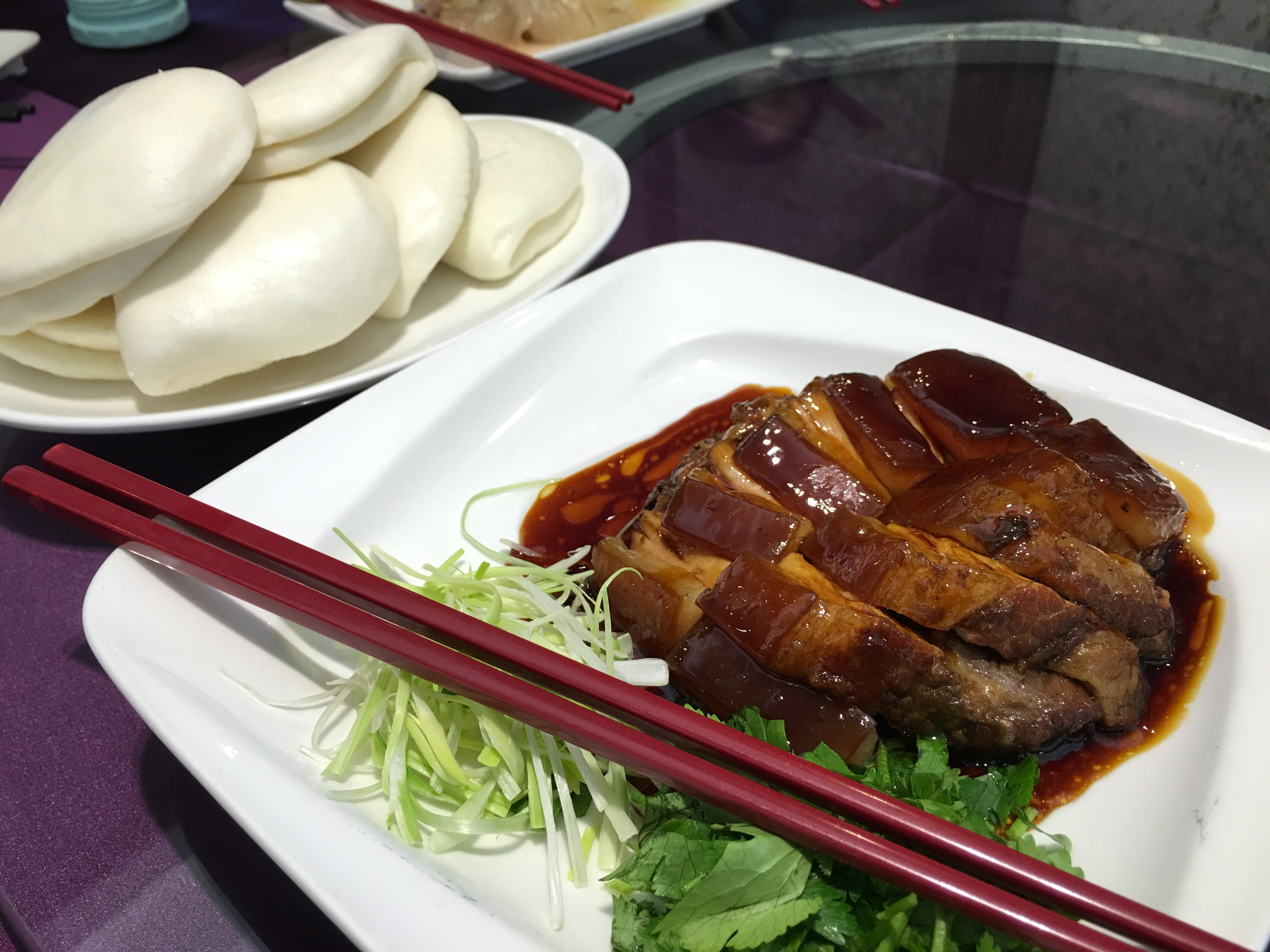
With gua bao

== See also ==
- Humba – Filipino braised pork dish
- Red braised pork belly – Chinese braised pork dish
- Philippine adobo – Filipino dish of meat cooked in soy sauce and vinegar
- List of pork dishes
