= Okazu =

Japanese food side dish

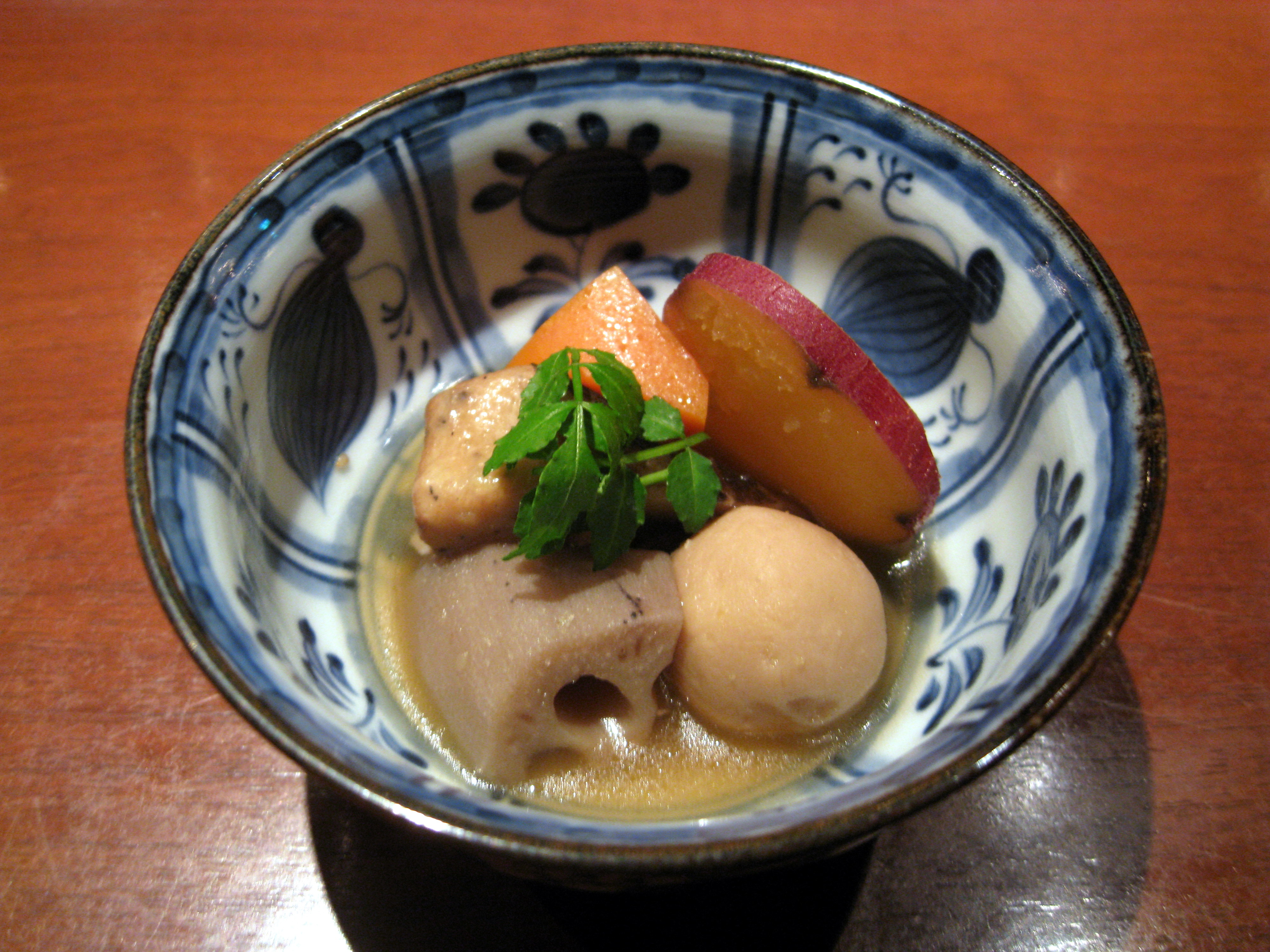
Okazu is just a name for "side dishes"

Okazu (おかず or お数; お菜; 御菜) is a Japanese word meaning a side dish to accompany rice; subsidiary articles of diet. They are cooked and seasoned in such a way as to match well when eaten with rice, and are typically made from fish, meat, vegetable, or tofu. Nearly any food eaten with rice can be considered okazu, though it is distinct from furikake, which is meant specifically to add flavor to the rice itself rather than to be eaten alongside rice. In modern Japanese cuisine, okazu can accompany noodles in place of rice.

== See also ==
- Banchan – Korean side dishes
- Meze – Small dish in Middle Eastern and Balkan cuisines
- Okazuya – Japanese-style delicatessen in Hawaii
- List of Japanese dishes#Common Japanese main and side dishes (okazu, おかず)
