= Rafute =

Pork rib dish in the Okinawan cuisine

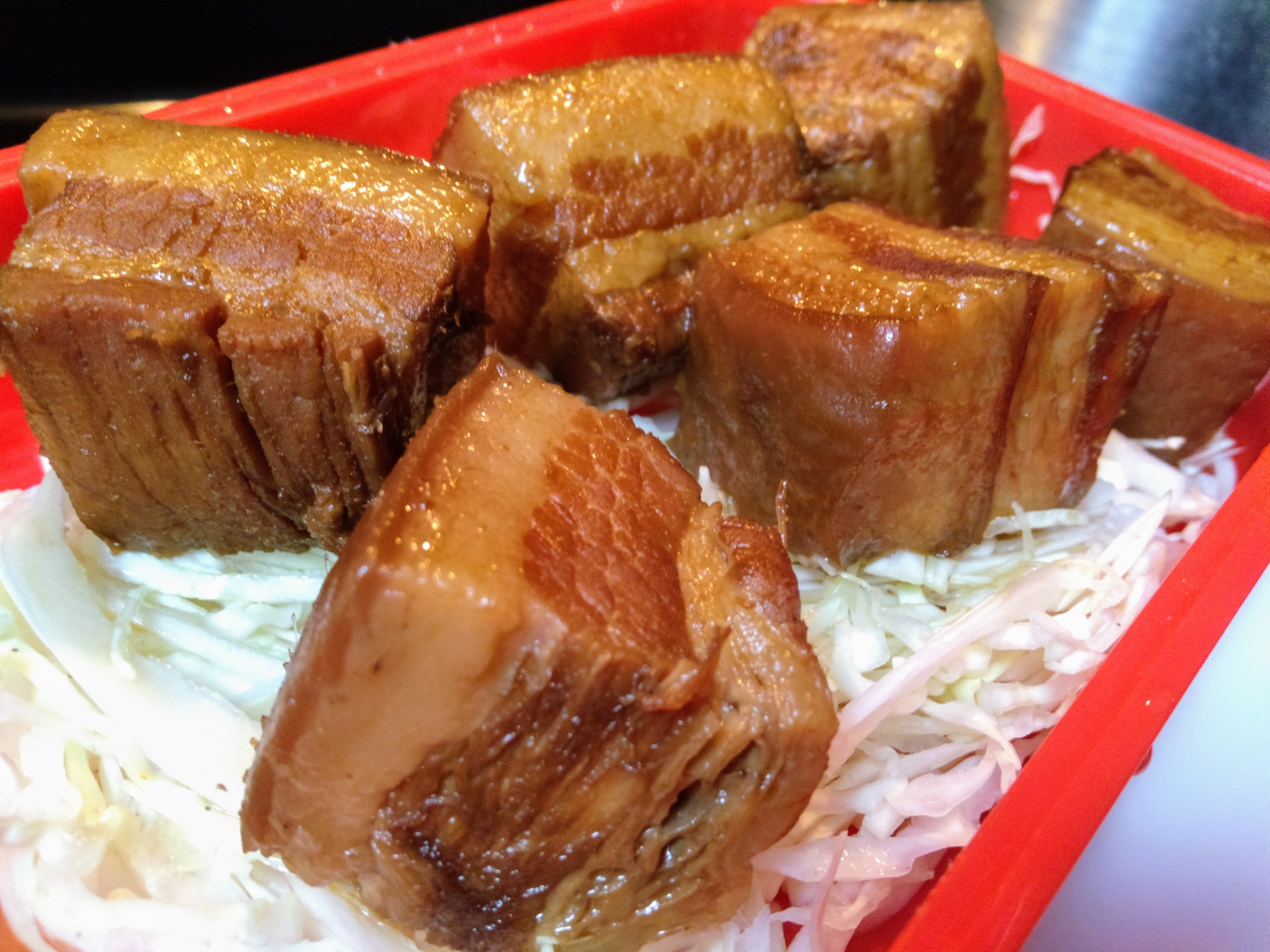
- Rafute, braised pork belly
- Place of origin: Japan
- Region or state: Okinawa
- Associated cuisine: Okinawan cuisine
- Main ingredients: Pork
- Ingredients generally used: Dashi, soy sauce, mirin, brown sugar, sake
- Similar dishes: Kakuni, Dongpo pork

Rafute is a pork belly dish in Okinawan cuisine, from the island of Okinawa, Japan. It consists of skin-on pork belly stewed in soy sauce and brown sugar. The dish is related to kakuni and Dongpo pork. It is traditionally considered to help with longevity. Rafute was originally a form of Okinawan royal cuisine.

In Hawaii, rafute is known as "shoyu pork," which is served in plate lunches. In the early 1900s, Okinawan immigrants in Hawaii introduced rafute into the local cuisine which later inspired other variations such as shoyu chicken. Okinawans owned and ran many restaurants and okazuya throughout Hawaii in the 1940s.

== Gallery ==
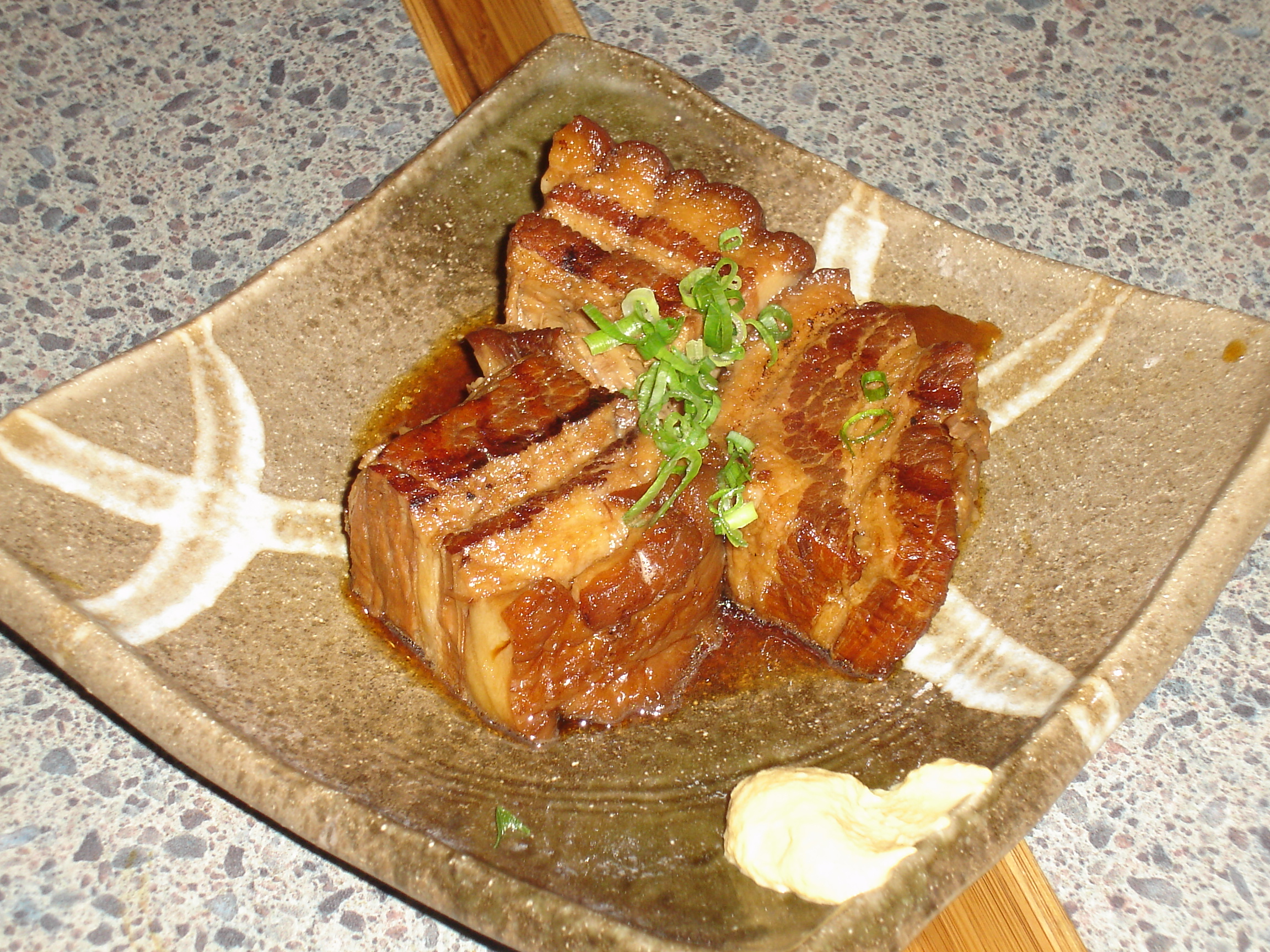
Rafute in Waikiki

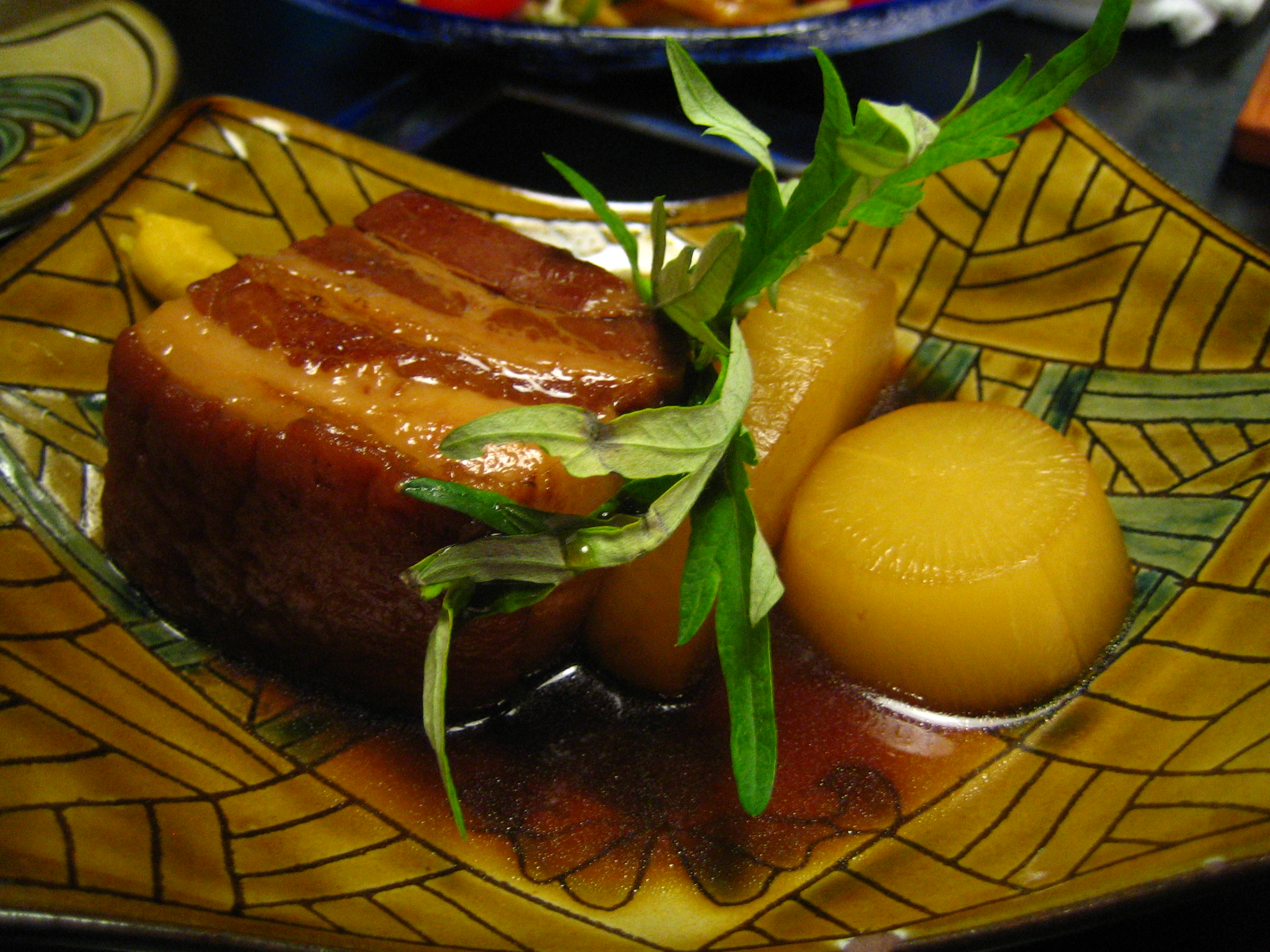
Rafute in Tokyo

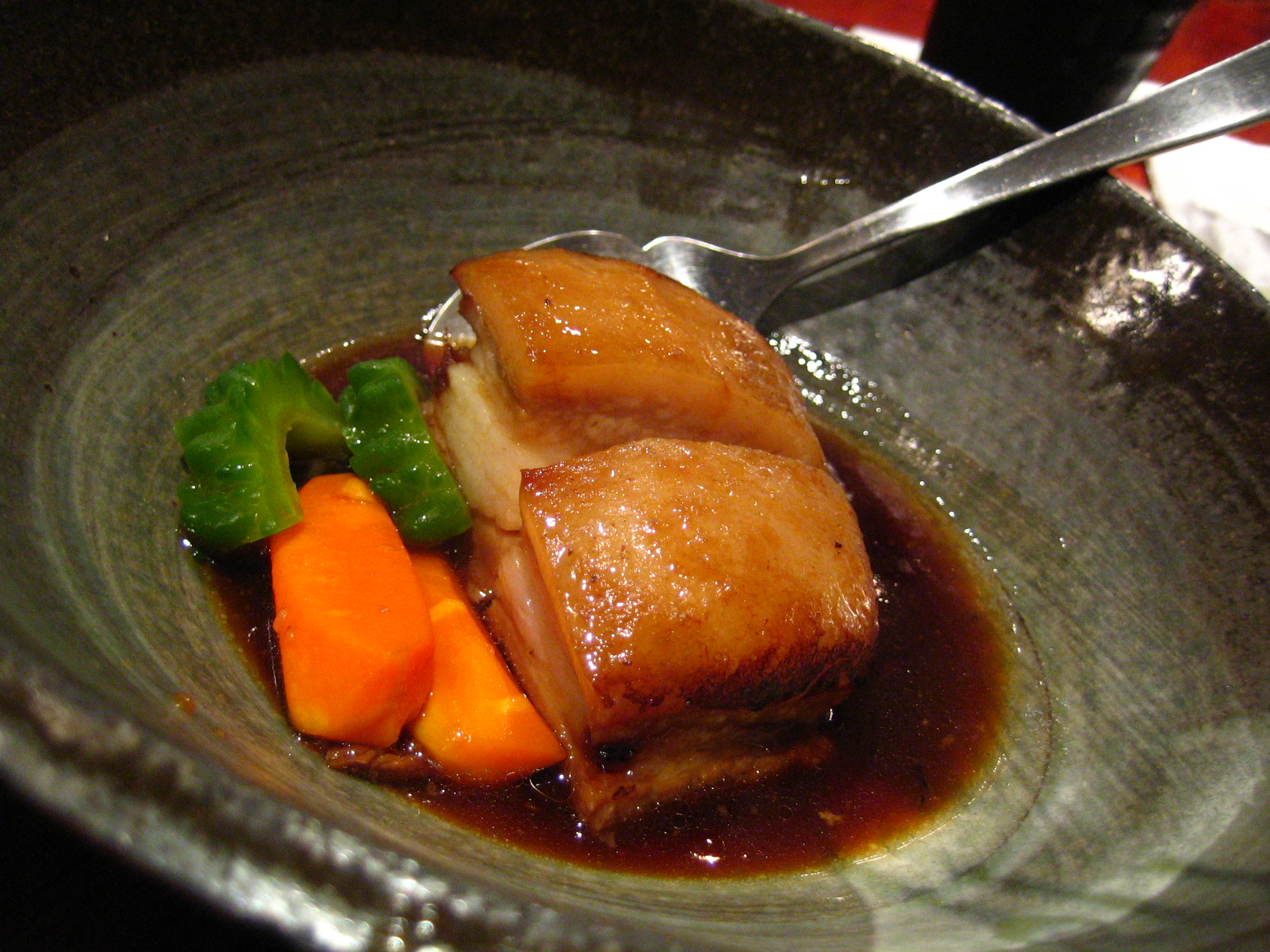
Rafute in Tokyo

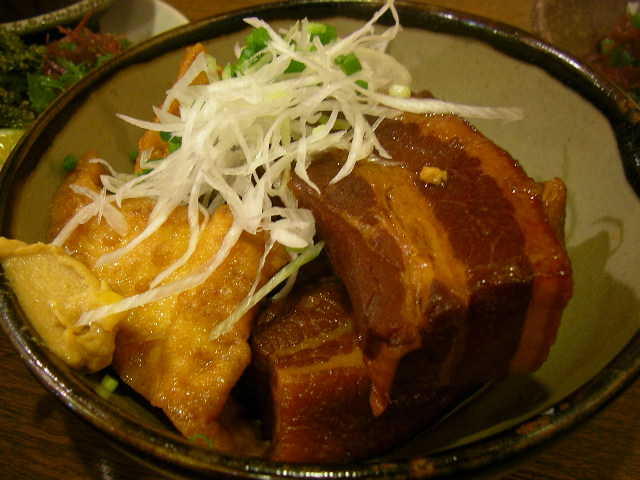
Rafute in Ginza, Tokyo

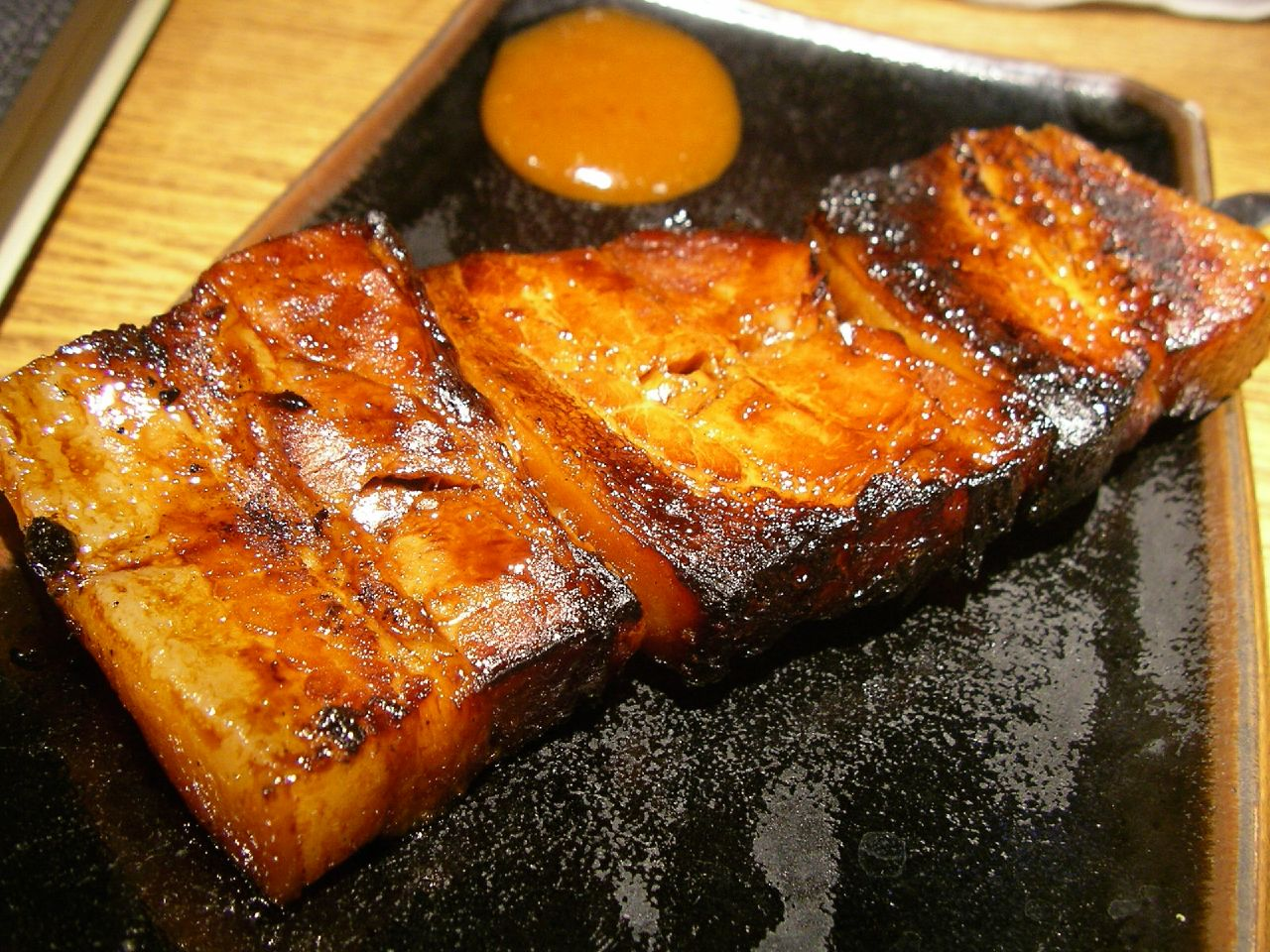
Skewered rafute

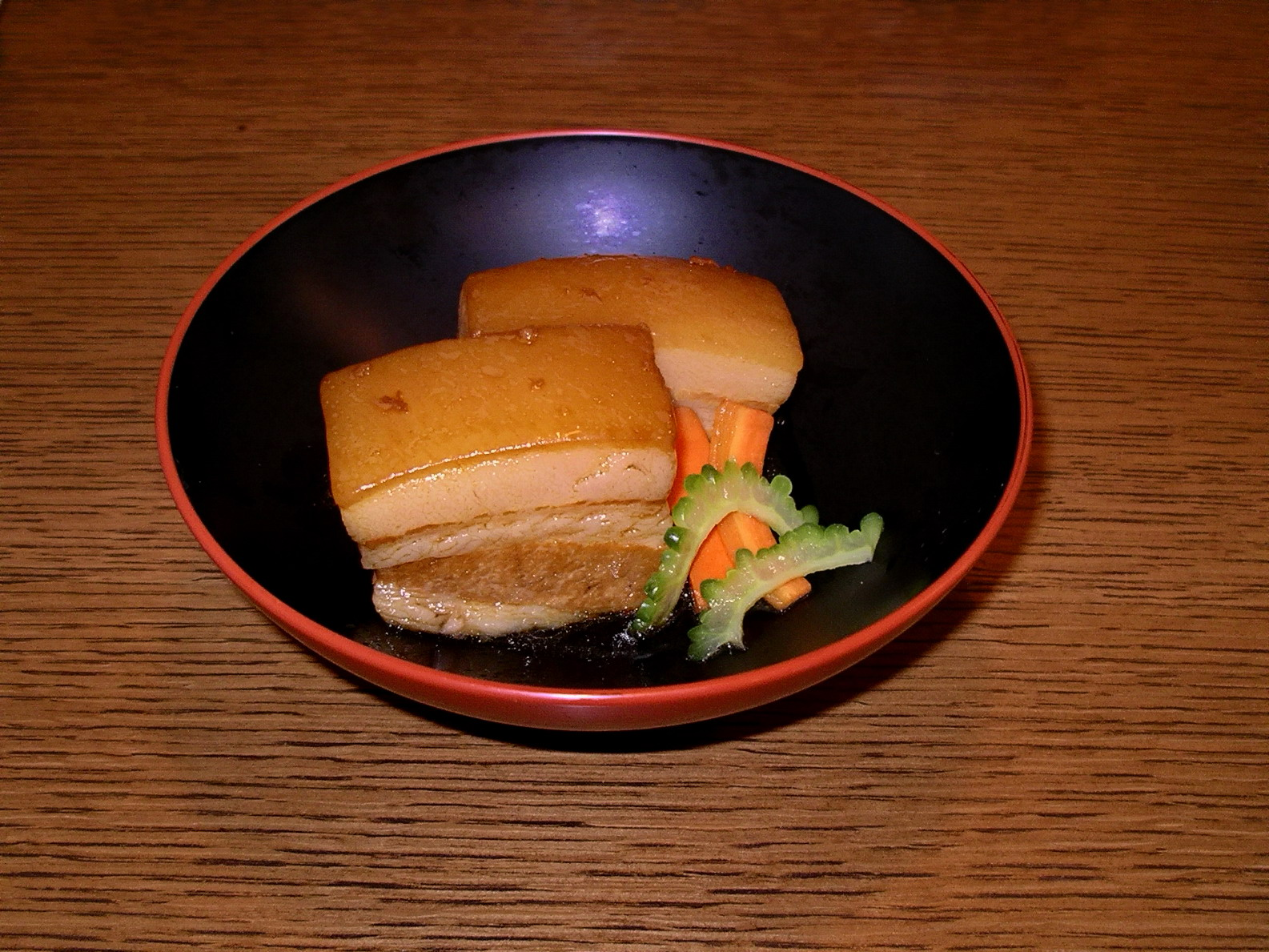
Okinawa rafute

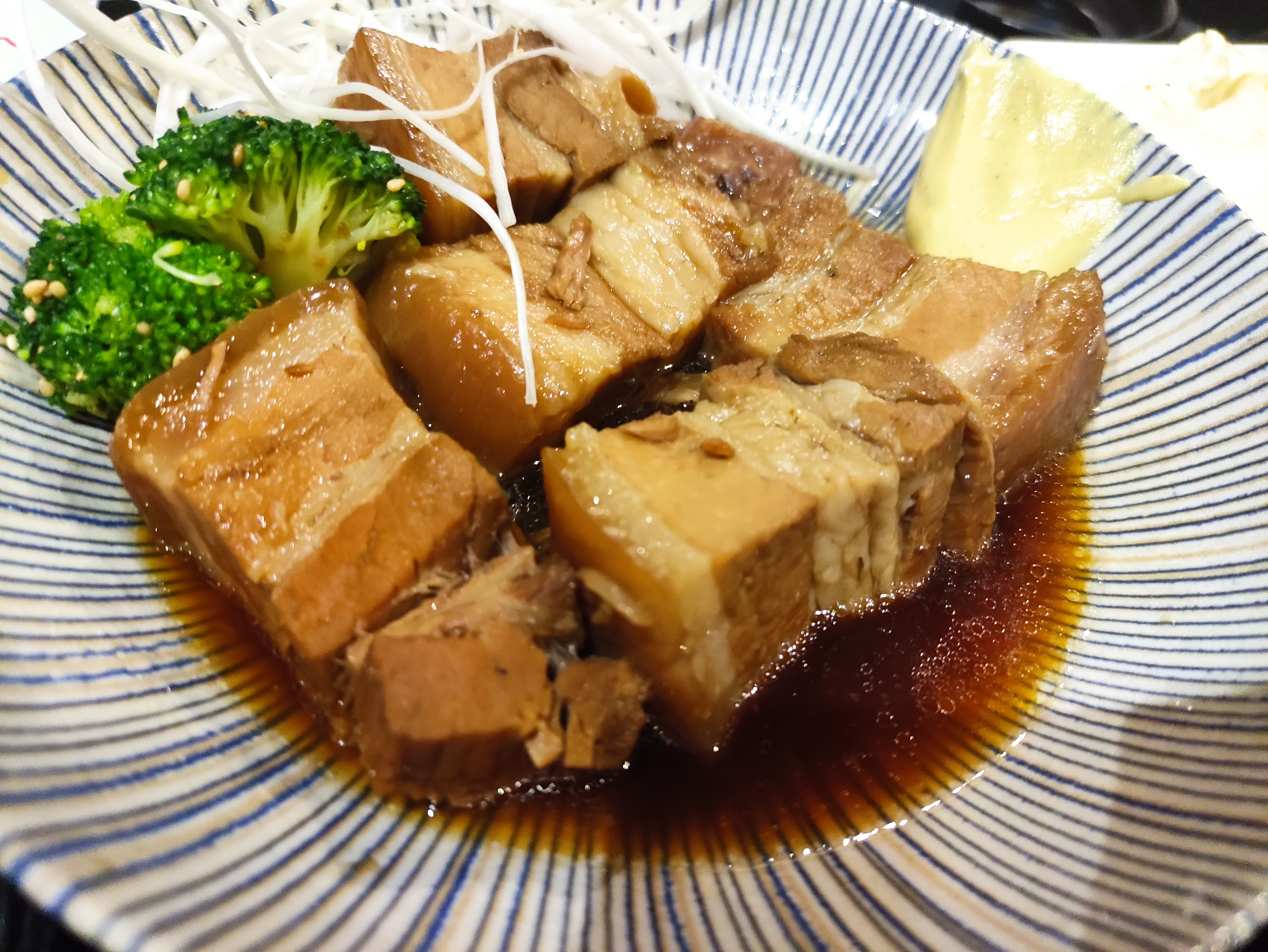

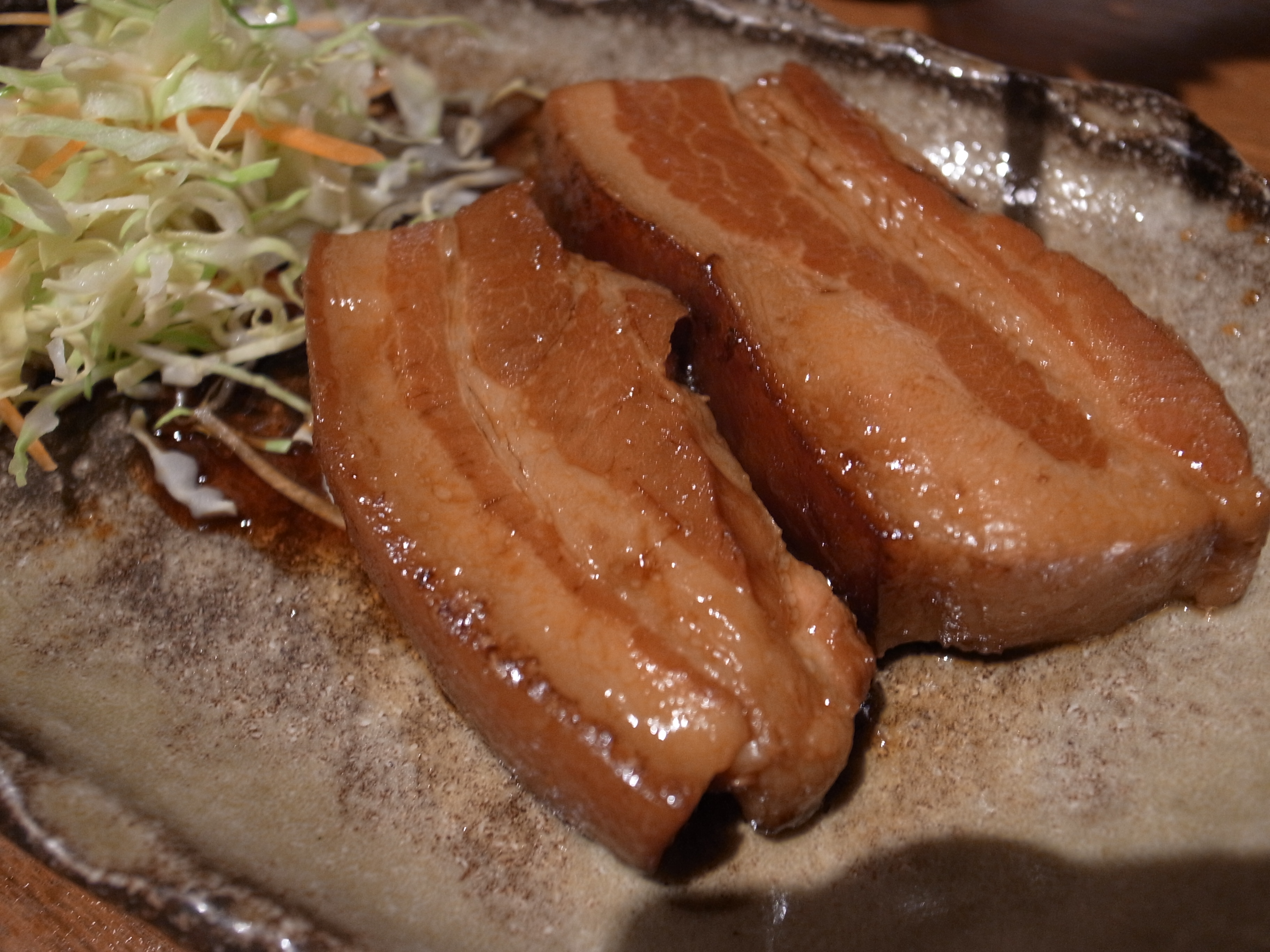

== See also ==
- Gōyā chanpurū – Okinawan stir fry dish
- Okinawan cuisine – Cuisine of Okinawa Prefecture, Japan
- Plate lunch – Quintessentially Hawaiian meal
- Dongpo pork – Chinese fried braised pork dish
- Okazuya – Japanese-style delicatessen in Hawaii, many started by Okinawans
