= Kakuni =

Japanese braised pork dish

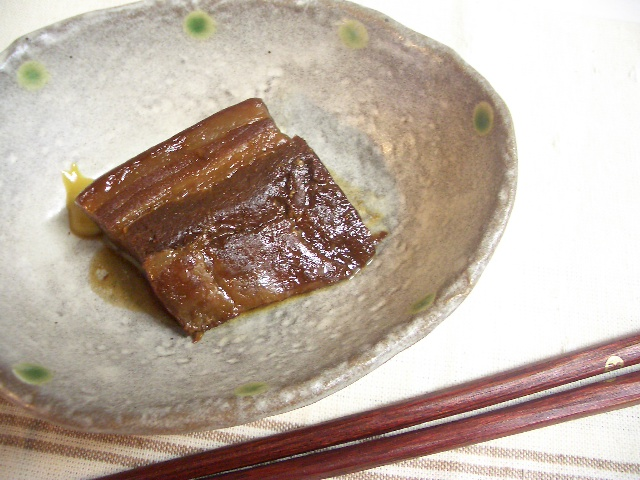
- Kakuni
- Place of origin: Japan
- Region or state: Kyushu
- Associated cuisine: Japanese cuisine
- Main ingredients: Pork
- Ingredients generally used: Dashi, soy sauce, mirin, sugar, sake
- Similar dishes: Rafute, Dongpo pork

Kakuni (角煮) is a Japanese braised pork belly dish which literally means 'square simmered'. It is made by braising fatty pieces of pork in soy sauce, mirin, and sugar.

== History ==
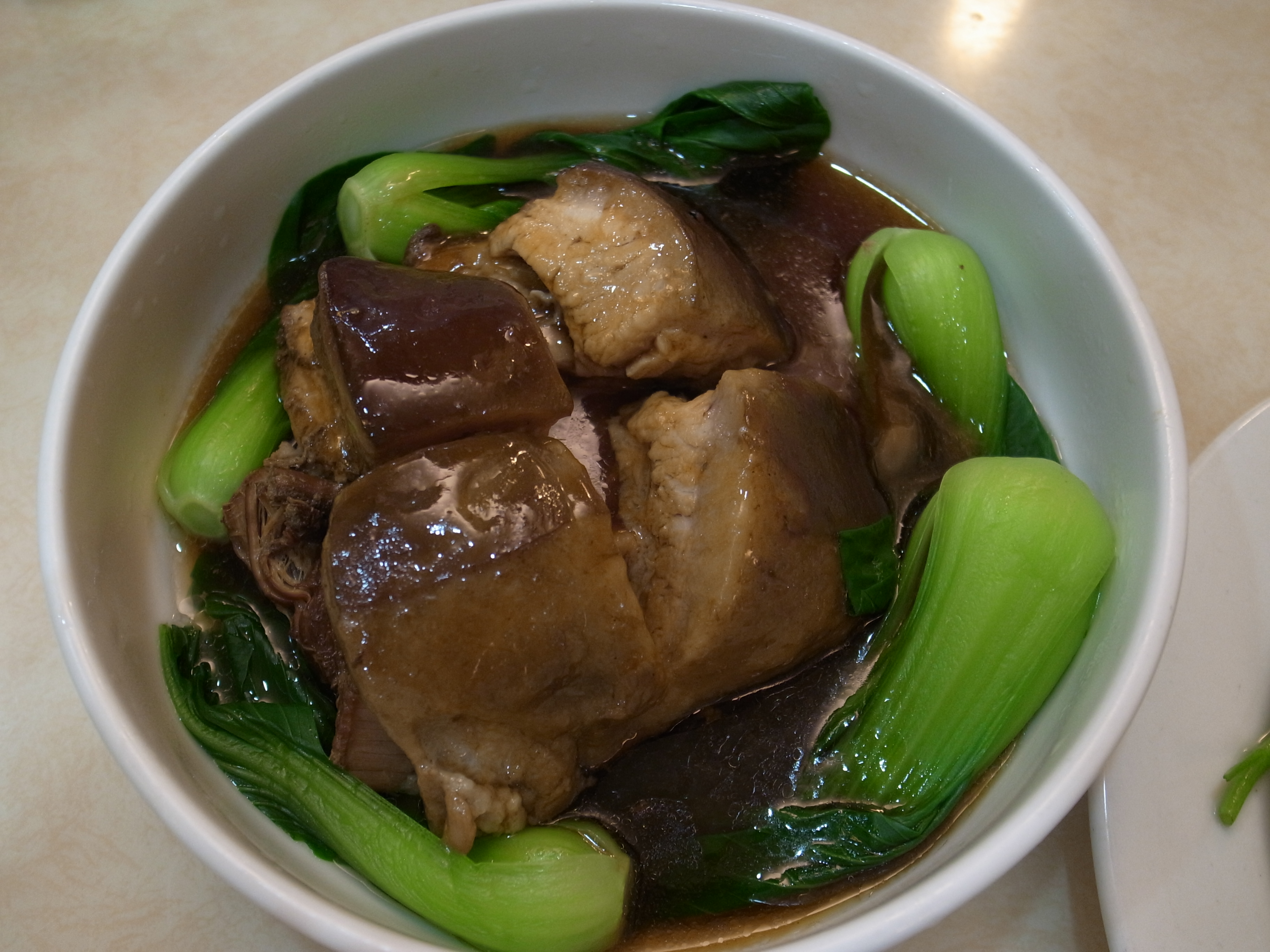
Kakuni and bok choy

Kakuni is a popular regional cuisine (meibutsu) of Kyushu, particularly Nagasaki. This particular dish most likely originated from the famous Chinese dish Dongpo Pork, making it a form of Japanese Chinese cuisine, although the gravy is less heavy than the original dish. During the Ming Dynasty and Song Dynasty, the main Sino-Japanese trading route existed between Hangzhou and Kyūshū. Many Chinese lived in major port cities in Kyushu, such as Nagasaki; likewise many Japanese lived in Hangzhou. Therefore, pork was popularized in major Kyushu cities.

== Preparation ==
Kakuni is made of thick cubes of pork belly simmered in dashi, soy sauce, mirin, sugar, and sake. By cooking it for a long time over a low temperature the collagen breaks-down into gelatin keeping the meat moist while becoming extremely tender allowing it to be consumed with chopsticks easily. The dish is often served with scallions, daikon and karashi.

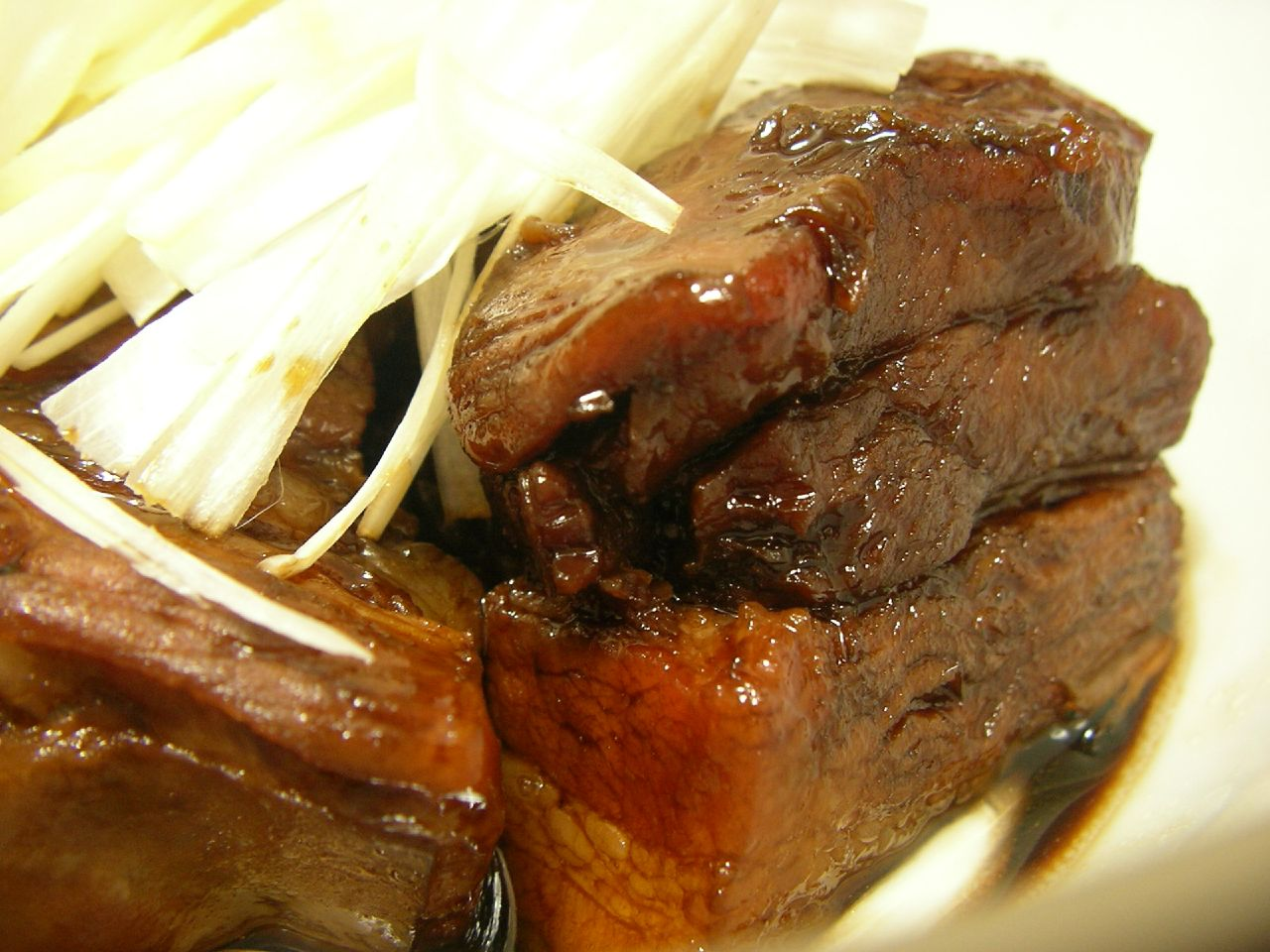

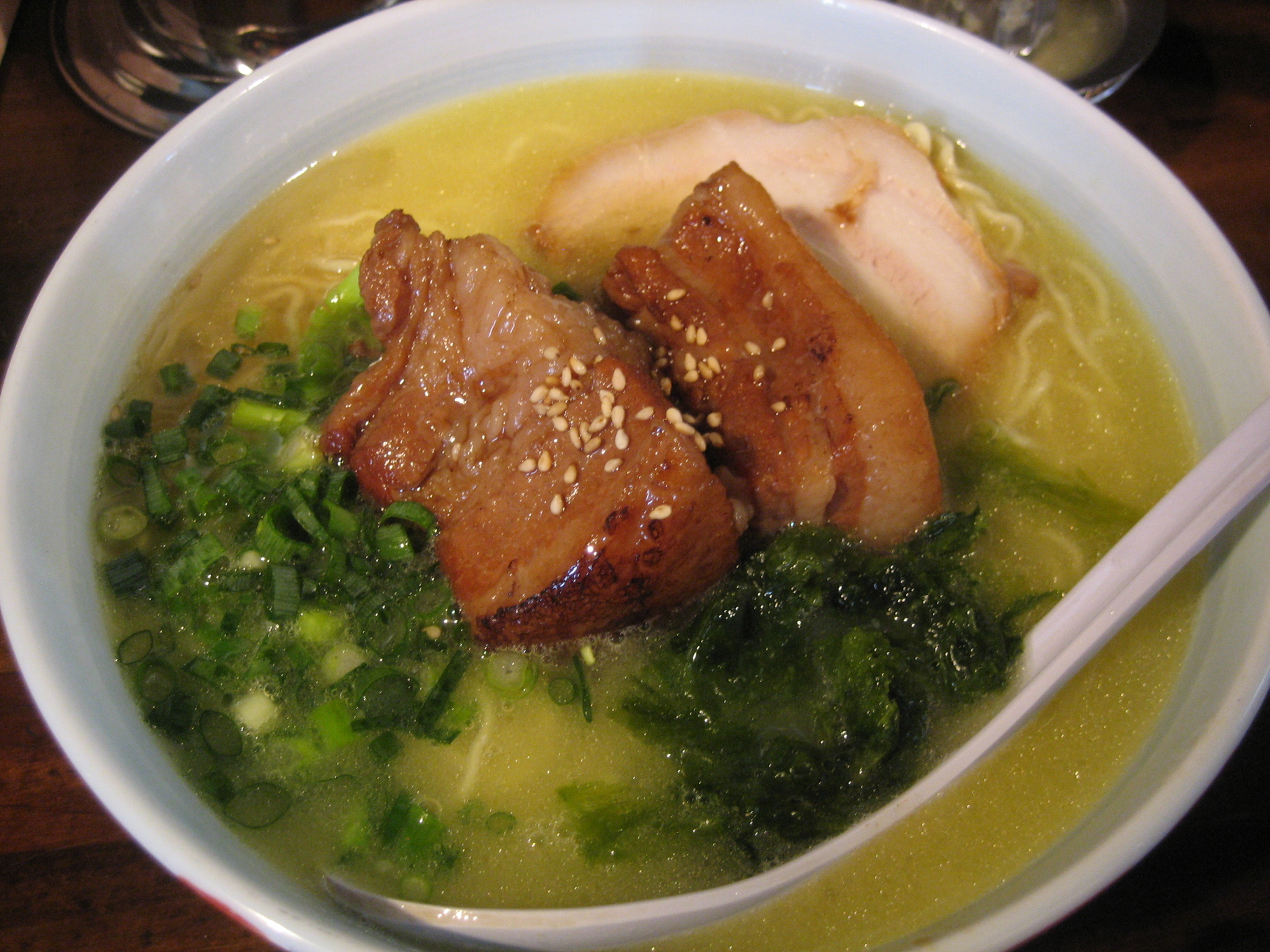
In ramen

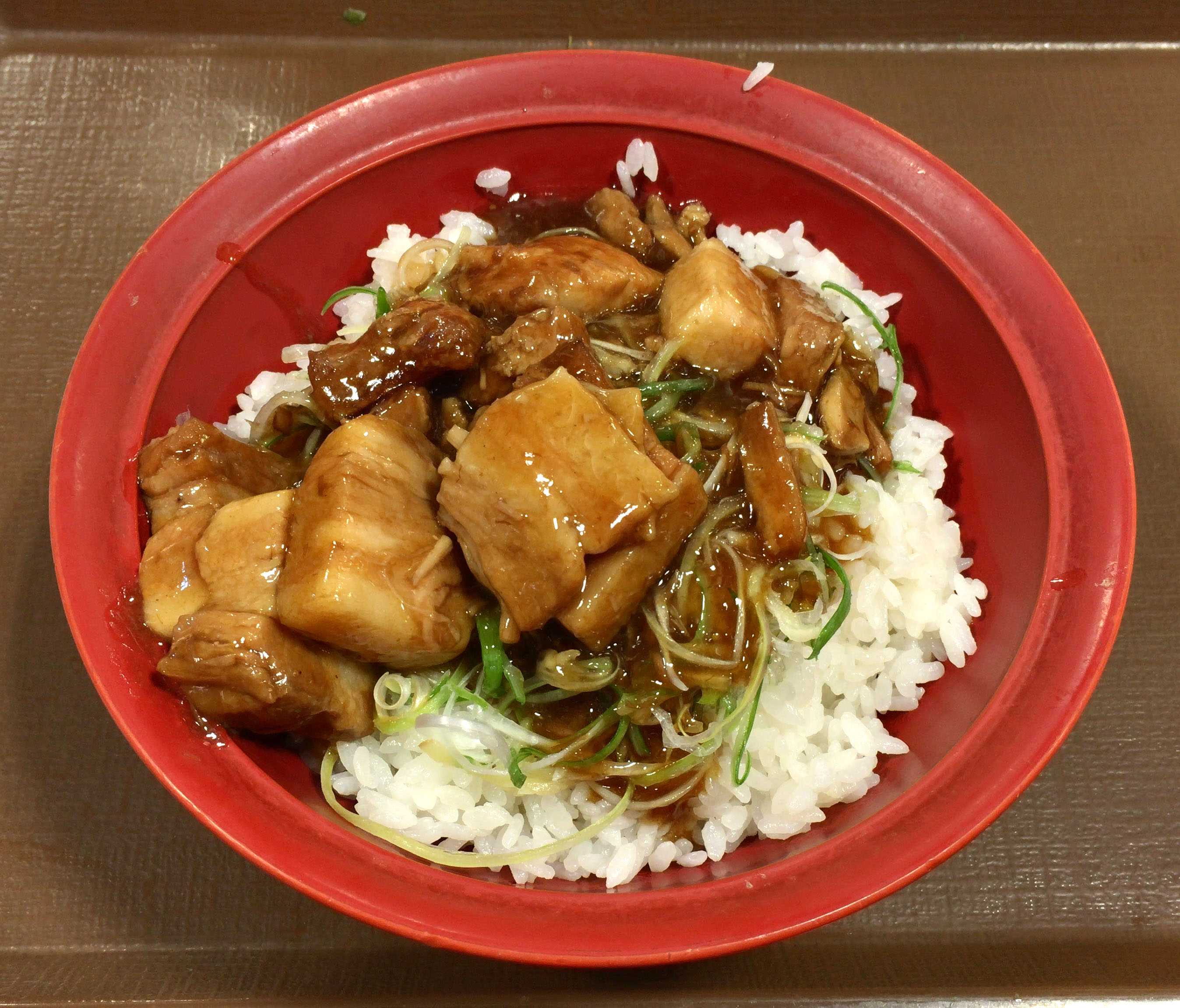
Kakuni bowl from Sukiya

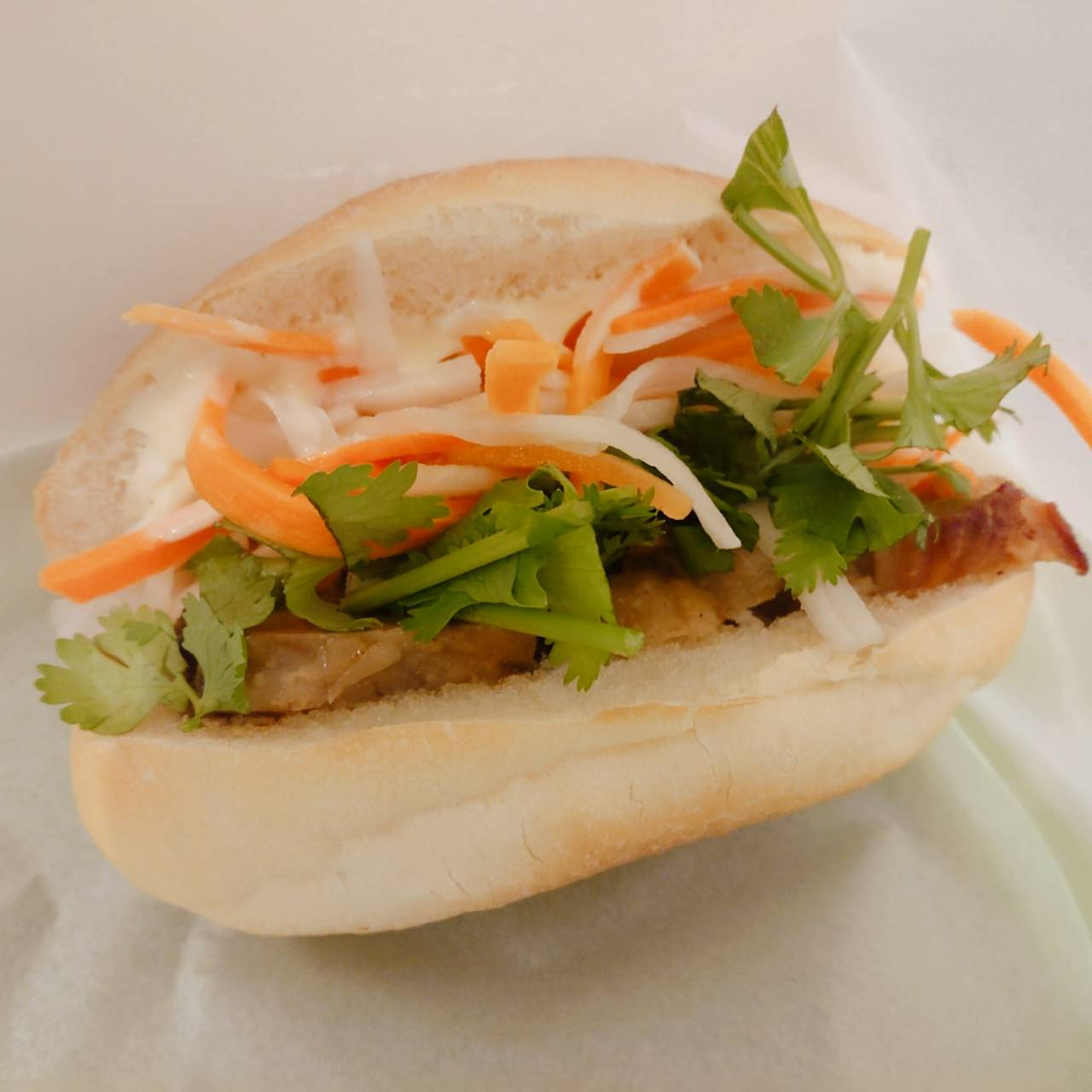
Kakuni burger

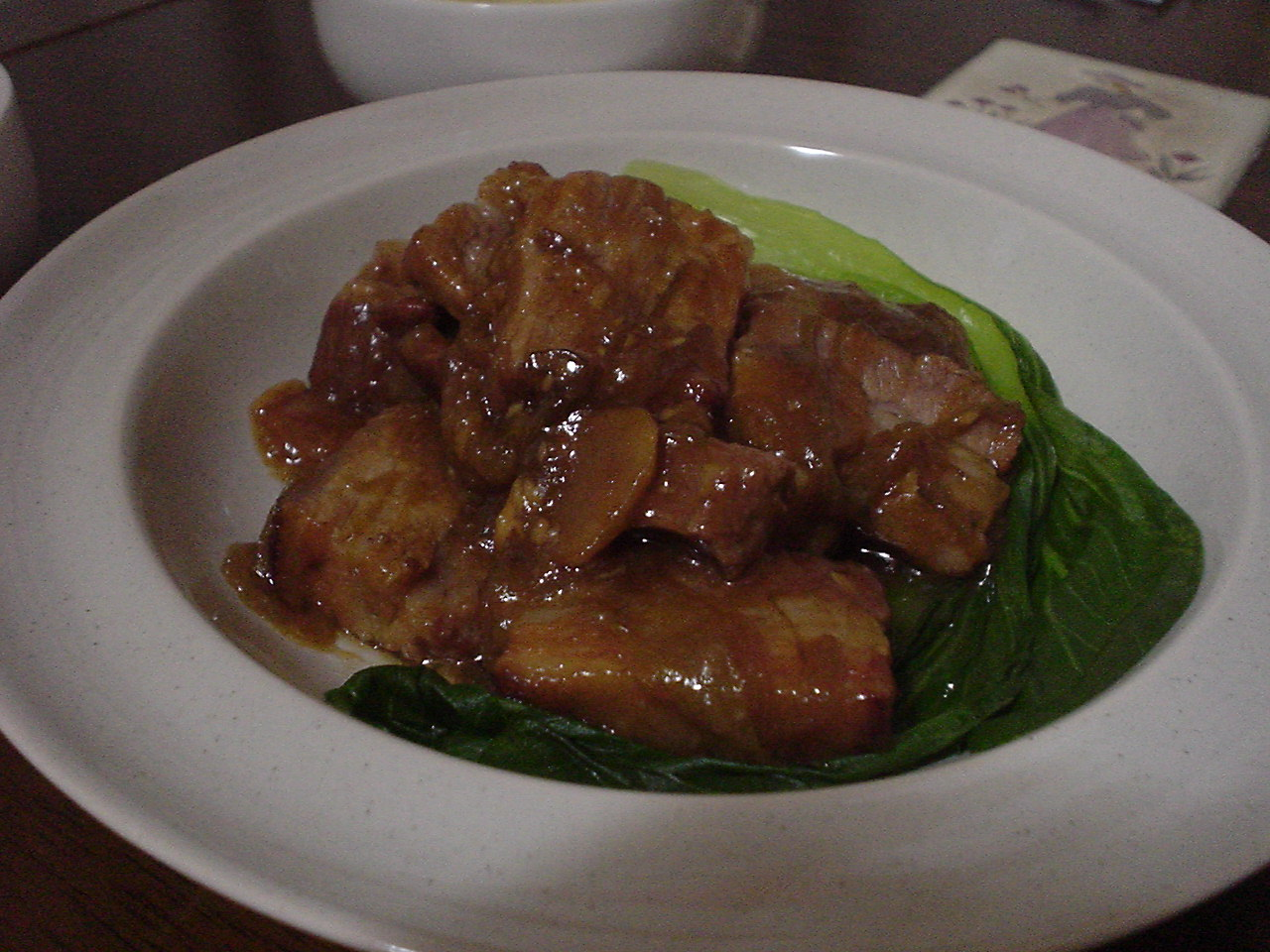

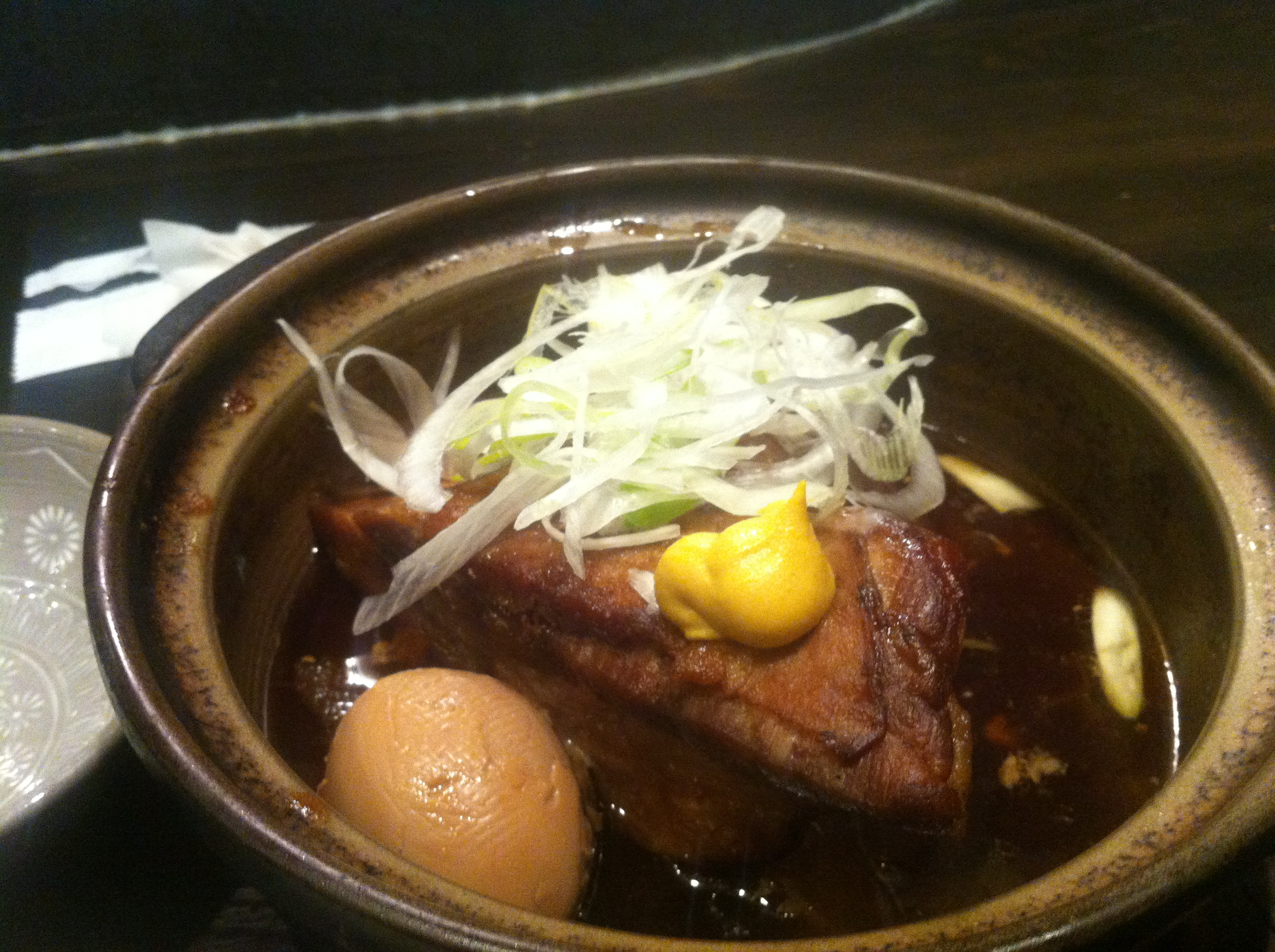

== See also ==
- Dongpo rou – Chinese fried braised pork dish
- List of pork dishes
