= Zhongxing Guesthouse =

Coordinates: 25°9′42.49″N 121°32′20.68″E

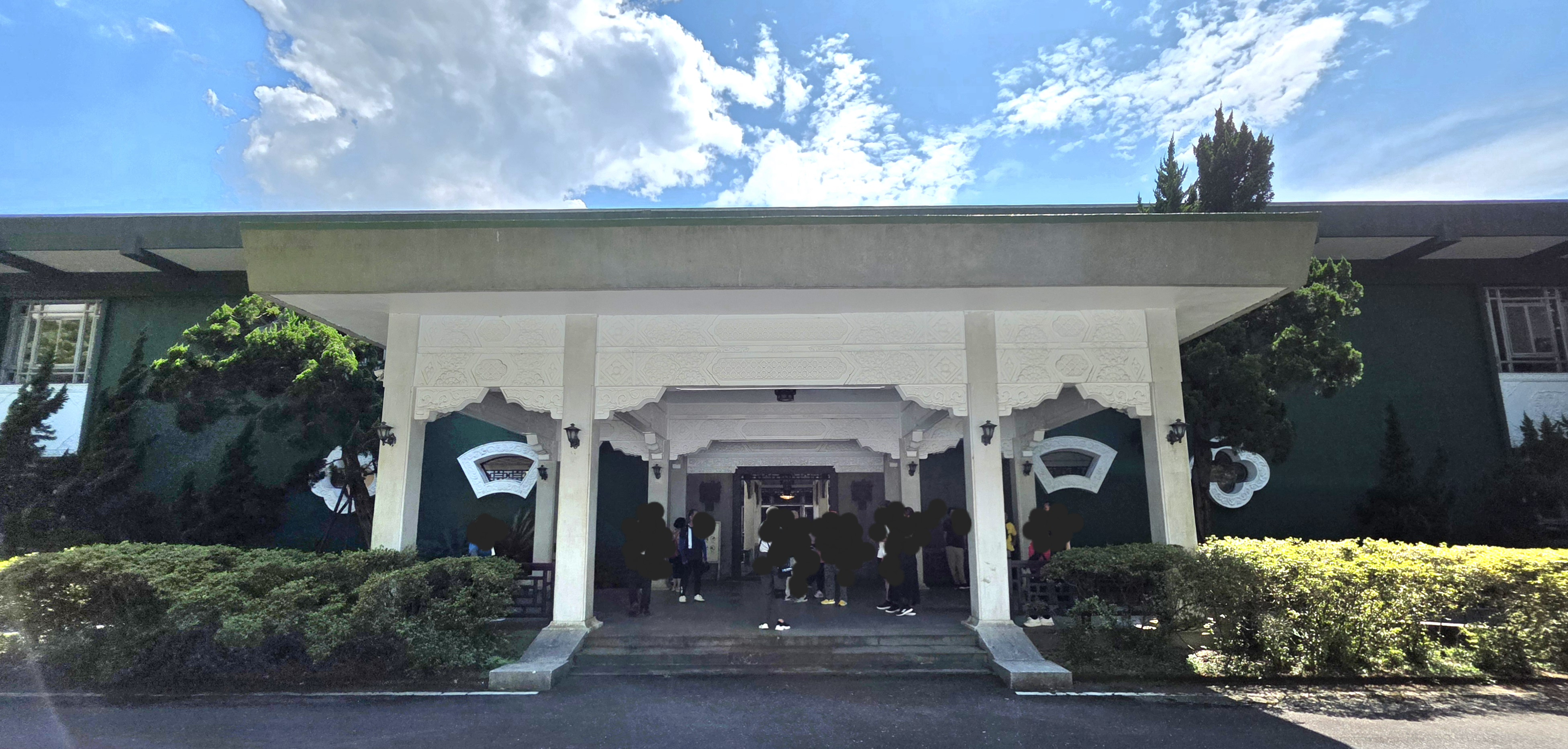
Zhongxing Guesthouse (front view)

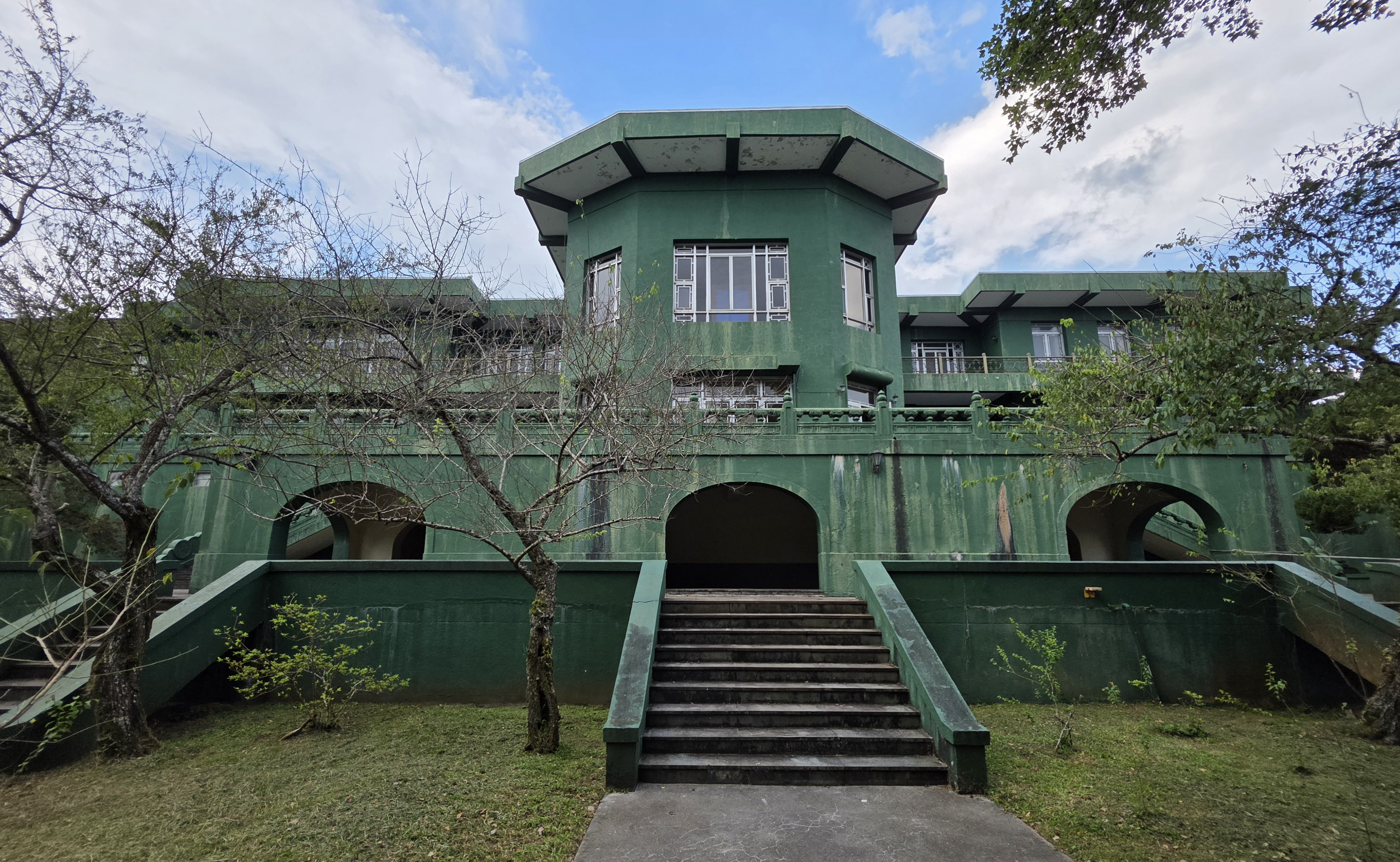
Zhongxing Guesthouse (back view)

The Zhongxing Guesthouse (Chinese: 中興賓館; pinyin: Zhōngxīng Bīnguǎn) also known as the Yangming Shuwu (陽明書屋; Yángmíng Shūwū) is a historical site located in on Zhongxing Road in Yangmingshan National Park in the Beitou District of Taipei, Taiwan. It was constructed between 1969 and 1970 by late President of the Republic of China Chiang Kai-shek for reception of important foreign guests and to act as a summer residence. It was designed by architect Huang Baoyu, who also designed the National Palace Museum.

== Overview ==
Chiang's largest villa, the Zhongxing Guesthouse, is set on 37 acres of plum trees and mountain landscape. The villa was used primarily as a summer retreat and the Chinese-style home includes courtyards, covered walkways and a fully stocked goldfish. The generalissimo reportedly favored morning walks and meditation sessions on the grounds, while Madame Chiang painted watercolor landscapes in her second floor studio. During the time the Zhongxing Guesthouse was in operation, the surrounding area, including Zhongxing Road was closed to public use due to the heavy security presence in the surrounding area. After Chiang died in 1975, the Zhongxing Guesthouse remained empty until 1979. In 1979, the Kuomintang Historical Commission took over administration, renamed it the Yangming Shuwu and established their party archives on the property. Historical documents and photographs from the Kuomintang's founding were stored here. In 1997, the Yangmingshuwu was donated to Yangmingshan National Park. In 1991, the road was gradually opened for public use. There are a series of bunkers and tunnels on the property. In 1998, the Zhongxing Guesthouse was opened to the public for tours.

== Photo Gallery ==
Front gate

Back view

Garden

Firewood shed

Underground tunnel

Exit of the tunnel

Main reception hall

== See also ==
- Guesthouses of Chiang Kai-shek
- Seven Seas Residence
