= Huang Baoyu =

Taiwanese artist, calligrapher and architect

- 黃寶瑜
- Born: 1918
- Died: 2000 (aged 81–82)
- Occupation: Architect
- Buildings: National Palace Museum; Zhongxing Guesthouse

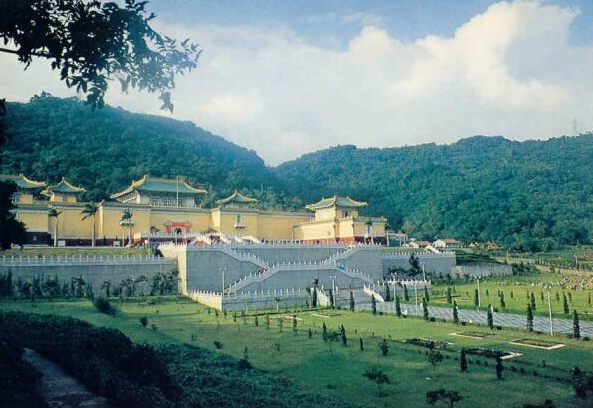
The National Palace Museum in 1970.

Huang Baoyu (Chinese: 黃寶瑜; 1918–2000) was a Taiwanese artist, calligrapher and architect, known for designing the National Palace Museum in Taipei, Taiwan. His design for the museum was chosen after the original competition winner, Wang Da-hong, refused to modify his design to comply with the government's wishes. Huang specialised in the traditional Chinese palace style, and was the favourite architect of former leader, Chiang Kai-shek.

Huang served as chairman of the architecture department of the Chung Yuan Christian College. He also served in a number of public institutions, working on urban planning projects such as Shimen Reservoir back pool area layout plan (1962), Yangming National Park Project (1963), Kaohsiung Lianchi Lake Scenic Area Plan (1966) and Forest Garden Construction Plan (1966).

Huang came to Taiwan from China in 1949, when he was appointed as a lecturer at the Provincial Institute of Technology.

== Notable works ==
- Shimen Reservoir Monument (c.1962)
- National Palace Museum, Taipei (c.1965)
- Taipei City Gate – repair and restoration (c.1966)
- Zhongxing Guesthouse, Taipei (c.1970)
- Zhongyuan Institute of Technology Building (c.1972)
- Sungai Central Community (c.1975)

== Publications ==
- 中山博物院之建築 The Architecture of the Chung-Shan Museum, The National Palace Museum Quarterly; 1966 (1.1): 69–78. (in Chinese, by the architect)
- A Brief History of Chinese Buddhist Architecture; Publisher: 大乘文化; (in Chinese, by the architect), 1978.
