= National Palace Museum =

Museum in Taipei, Taiwan

- 國立故宮博物院

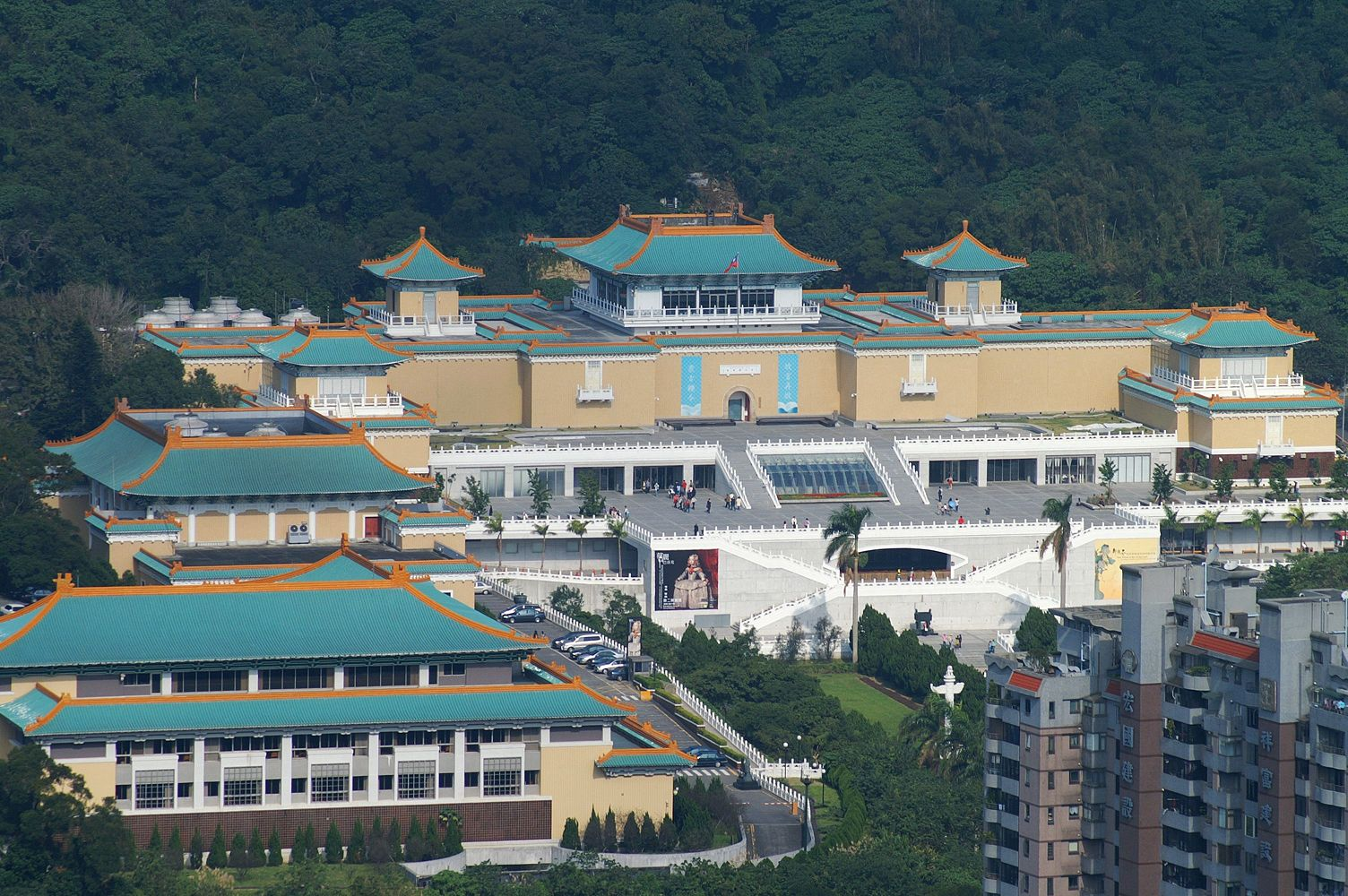
- National Palace Museum, Taipei, Taiwan
- Interactive fullscreen map
- Established: 10 October 1925 (in Forbidden City, Beijing); 12 November 1965 (in Taipei, Taiwan)
- Location: Shilin, Taipei, Taiwan
- Coordinates: 25°06′08″N 121°32′55″E
- Type: National museum
- Collections: 699,119 (as of December 2025)
- Visitors: Northern branch: 2,426,842 (2025); Southern branch: 1,166,291 (2025)
- Director: Hsiao Tsung-huang
- Architect: Huang Baoyu (Northern Branch) Kris Yao (Southern Branch)
- Website: npm.gov.tw

Chinese name
- Traditional Chinese: 國立故宮博物院
- Simplified Chinese: 国立故宫博物院
Transcriptions
Standard Mandarin
- Hanyu Pinyin: Guólì gùgōng bówùyuàn
- Wade–Giles: Kuo^{2}-li^{4} ku^{4}-kung^{1} po^{2}-wu^{4}-yüan^{4}
- IPA: [kwǒlî kûkʊ́ŋ pwǒ.û.ɥɛ̂n]
Hakka
- Pha̍k-fa-sṳ: Kwet-li̍p kù-kiung pok-vu̍t-yèn
Yue: Cantonese
- Jyutping: gwok3 laap6 gu3 gung1 bok3 mat6 jyun6
Southern Min
- Hokkien POJ: Kok-li̍p Kò͘-kiong Phok-bu̍t-īⁿ
- Tâi-lô: Kok-li̍p Kòo-kiong Phok-bu̍t-īnn

The National Palace Museum, (Note: traditional Chinese: 國立故宮博物院; simplified Chinese: 国立故宫博物院; pinyin: Guólì Gùgōng Bówùyuàn) also known as Taipei Palace Museum, (Note: traditional Chinese: 臺北故宮; simplified Chinese: 台北故宫; pinyin: Táiběi Gùgōng) is a national museum headquartered in Taipei, Taiwan. Founded in Beijing in 1925, the museum was re-established in Shilin, Taipei, in 1965, later expanded with a southern branch in Taibao, Chiayi, in 2015.

The museum holds a permanent collection of nearly 700,000 pieces of artifacts and artworks, primarily comprising items relocated from the Beijing Palace Museum and other institutions in mainland China during the government of the Republic of China's retreat to Taiwan. Before the re-establishment of the museum in Shilin in 1965, these collections were temporarily housed in various locations across Taiwan.

Spanning 8,000 years of history from the Neolithic to the modern era, the museum's collection reflects a comprehensive record of Chinese history. Like the Palace Museum in Beijing, the museum's extensive array of artifacts and artworks were based on the imperial collections of the Ming and Qing dynasties in the Forbidden City.

== History ==
=== In Mainland China ===
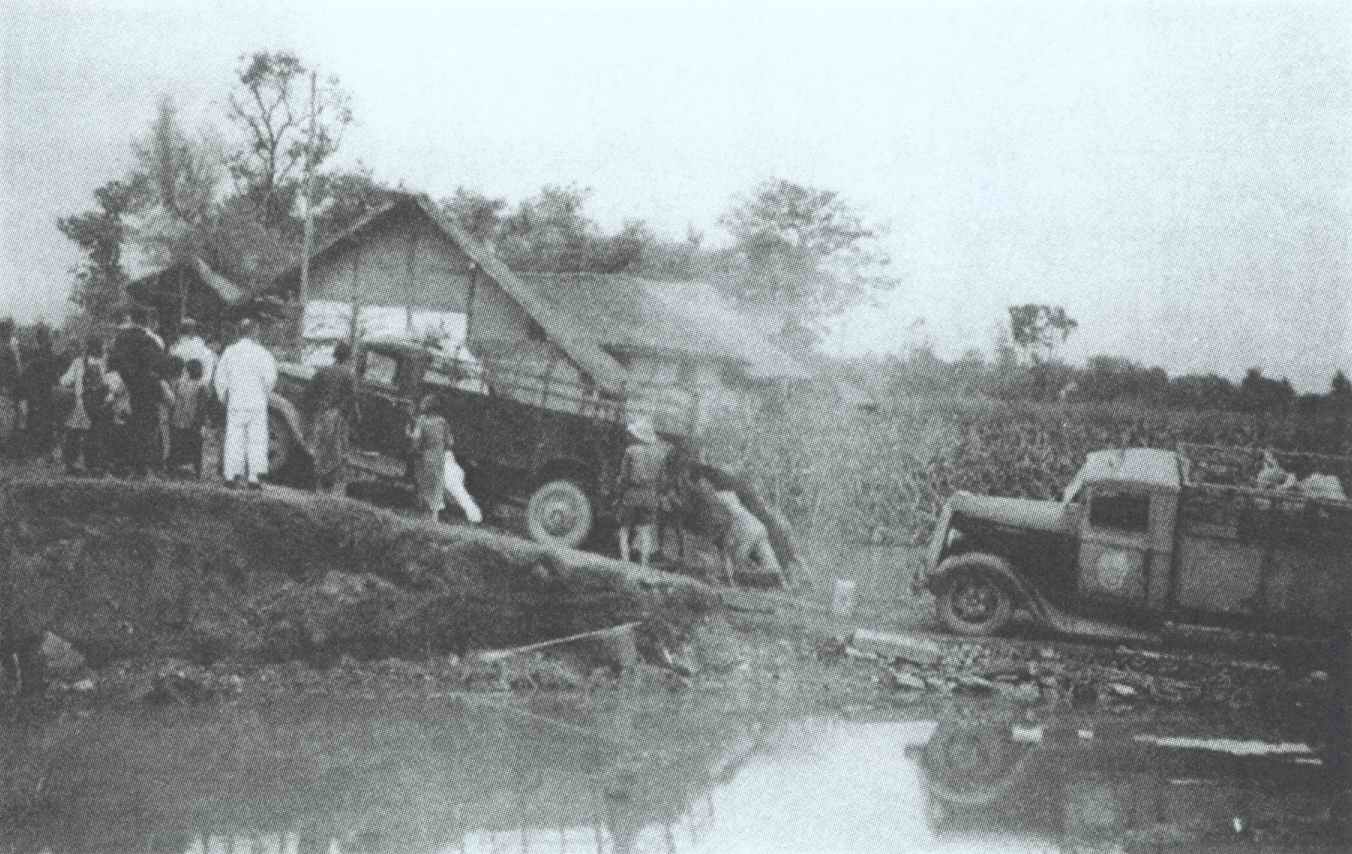
The National Palace Museum treasure fleeing Japanese forces in the 1930s

The National Palace Museum was originally established as the Palace Museum in the Forbidden City on 10 October 1925, shortly after the expulsion of Puyi, the last emperor of China, from the Forbidden City by warlord Feng Yuxiang. The articles in the museum consisted of the valuables of the former imperial family.

In 1931, shortly after the Mukden Incident, the Nationalist Government ordered the museum to make preparations to evacuate its most valuable pieces out of the city to prevent them from falling into the hands of the Imperial Japanese Army. As a result, from 6 February to 15 May 1933, the Palace Museum's 13,491 crates and 6,066 crates of objects from the Exhibition Office of Ancient Artifacts, the Summer Palace and the Imperial Hanlin Academy were moved in five groups to Shanghai. In 1936, the collection was moved to Nanjing after the construction of the storage in the Taoist monastery Chaotian Palace was complete. As the Imperial Japanese Army advanced farther inland during the Second Sino-Japanese War, which merged into the greater conflict of World War II, the collection was moved westward via three routes to several places including Anshun and Leshan until the surrender of Japan in 1945. In 1947, it was shipped back to the warehouse in Nanjing.

=== In Taiwan ===
The Chinese Civil War resumed following the surrender of the Japanese, ultimately resulting in Generalissimo Chiang Kai-shek's decision to evacuate the arts to Taiwan, which had been handed over to the ROC in 1945. When the fighting worsened in 1948 between the Communist and Nationalist armies, the National Beijing Palace Museum and other five institutions made the decision to send some of the most prized items to Taiwan. Hang Li-wu, later director of the museum, supervised the transport of some of the collection in three groups from Nanjing to the harbor in Keelung, Taiwan, between December 1948 and February 1949. By the time the items arrived in Taiwan, the Communist army had already seized control of the National Palace Museum collection from Beijing, so not all of the collection could be sent to Taiwan. A total of 2,972 crates of artifacts from the Forbidden City moved to Taiwan accounted for only 22% of the crates originally transported south, although the pieces represented some of the very best of the collection.

Three shipments from Nanjing to Keelung between 1948 and 1949
Institutions	Number of crates in shipments			Total
Institutions	1	2	3	Total
National Beijing Palace Museum	320	1,680	972	2,972
National Central Museum	212	486	154	852
National Central Library	60	462	122	644
The IHP of Academia Sinica	120	856		976
Ministry of Foreign Affairs	60			60
National Beijing Library		18		18
Total	772	3,502	1,248	5,522

The collection from the National Beijing Palace Museum, the Preparatory Office of the National Central Museum, the National Central Library, and the National Beijing Library was stored in a railway warehouse in Yangmei following transport across the Taiwan Strait and was later moved to storage in a cane sugar mill near Taichung. In 1949, the Executive Yuan created the Joint Managerial Office for the National Beijing Palace Museum, the Preparatory Office of the National Central Museum, and the National Central Library, to oversee the organization of the collection. For security reasons, the Joint Managerial Office chose the mountain village of Beigou, located in Wufeng, Taichung, as the new storage site for the collection. The following year, the collection stored at the cane sugar mill was transported to the new site in Beigou.

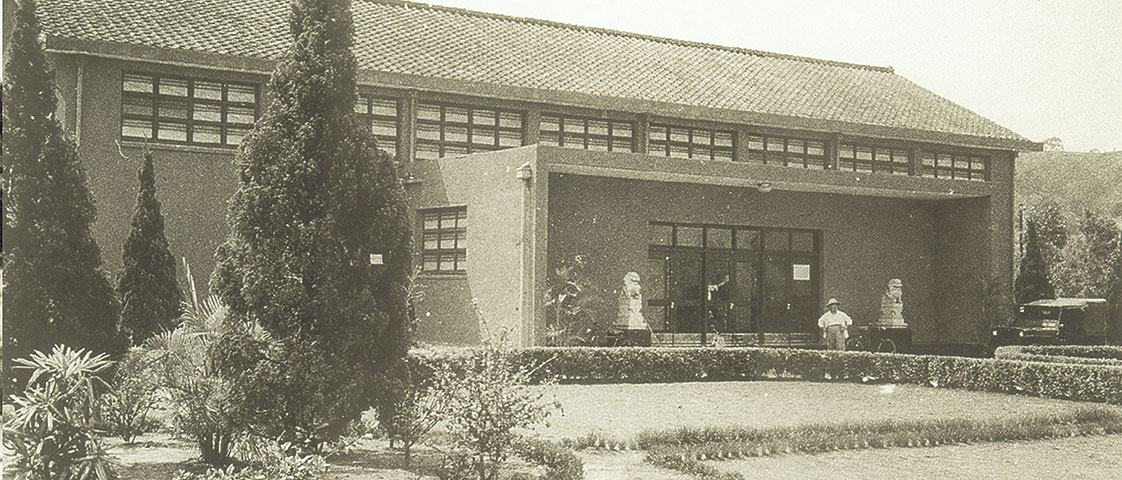
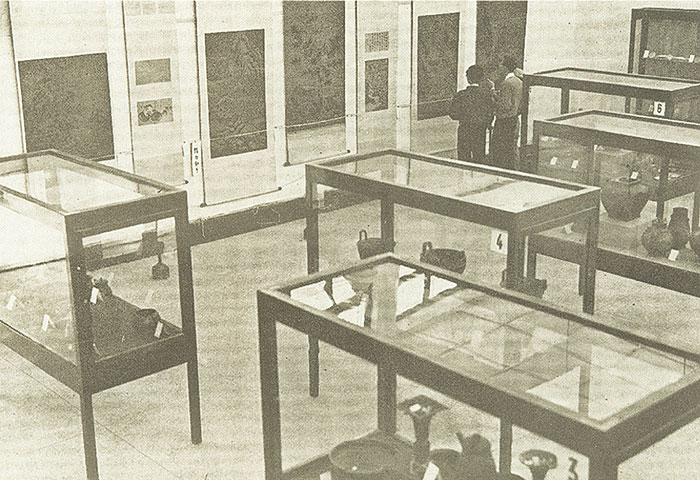
The exhibition hall and gallery in Beigou

With the National Central Library's reinstatement in 1955, the collection from the National Beijing Library was simultaneously incorporated into the National Central Library. The Joint Managerial Office of the National Beijing Palace Museum and the Preparatory Office of the National Central Museum stayed in Beigou for another ten years. During the decade, the office obtained a grant from the Asia Foundation to construct a small-scale exhibition hall in the spring of 1956. The exhibition hall, opened in March 1957, was divided into four galleries in which it was possible to exhibit more than 200 items.

In the autumn of 1960, the office received a grant of NT$32 million from AID. The Republic of China (ROC) government also contributed more than NT$30 million to establish a special fund for the construction of a museum in the Taipei suburb of Waishuanxi. The construction of the museum in Waishuanxi was completed in August 1965. The new museum site was christened the "Chung-Shan Museum" in honor of the founding father of the ROC, Sun Yat-sen, and first opened to the public on the centenary of Sun Yat-sen's birthday. Since then, the museum in Taipei has managed, conserved and exhibited the collections of the National Beijing Palace Museum and the Preparatory Office of the National Central Museum.

== Architecture ==
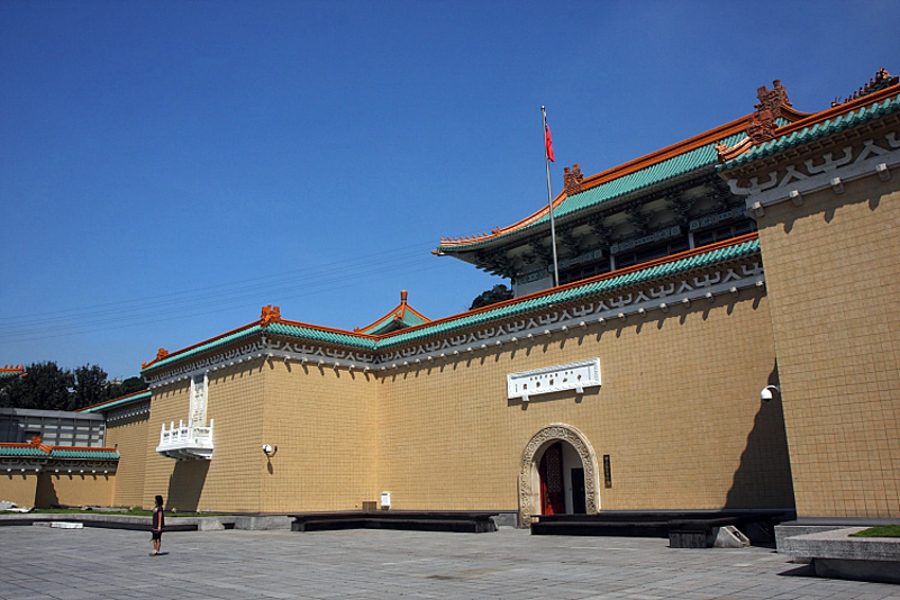
Main Hall of the Northern Branch of National Palace Museum

=== Northern Branch ===
The National Palace Museum's main building in Taipei was designed by Huang Baoyu and constructed from March 1964 to August 1965. Due to the insufficient space to put on display over 600,000 artifacts, the museum underwent expansions in 1967, 1970, 1984 and 1996. In 2002, the museum underwent a major US$21 million renovation revamping the museum to make it more spacious and modern. The renovation closed about two-thirds of the museum section and the museum officially reopened in February 2007.

Permanent exhibitions of painting and calligraphy are rotated once every three months. Approximately 3,000 pieces of the museum's collection can be viewed at a given time. Although brief, these exhibitions are extremely popular. In 2014, the museum organized the top three best-attended exhibitions worldwide, including paintings and calligraphic works by Tang Yin, as well as depictions of the Qing dynasty's Qianlong Emperor reinterpreted by contemporary artists.

==== Zhishan Garden ====
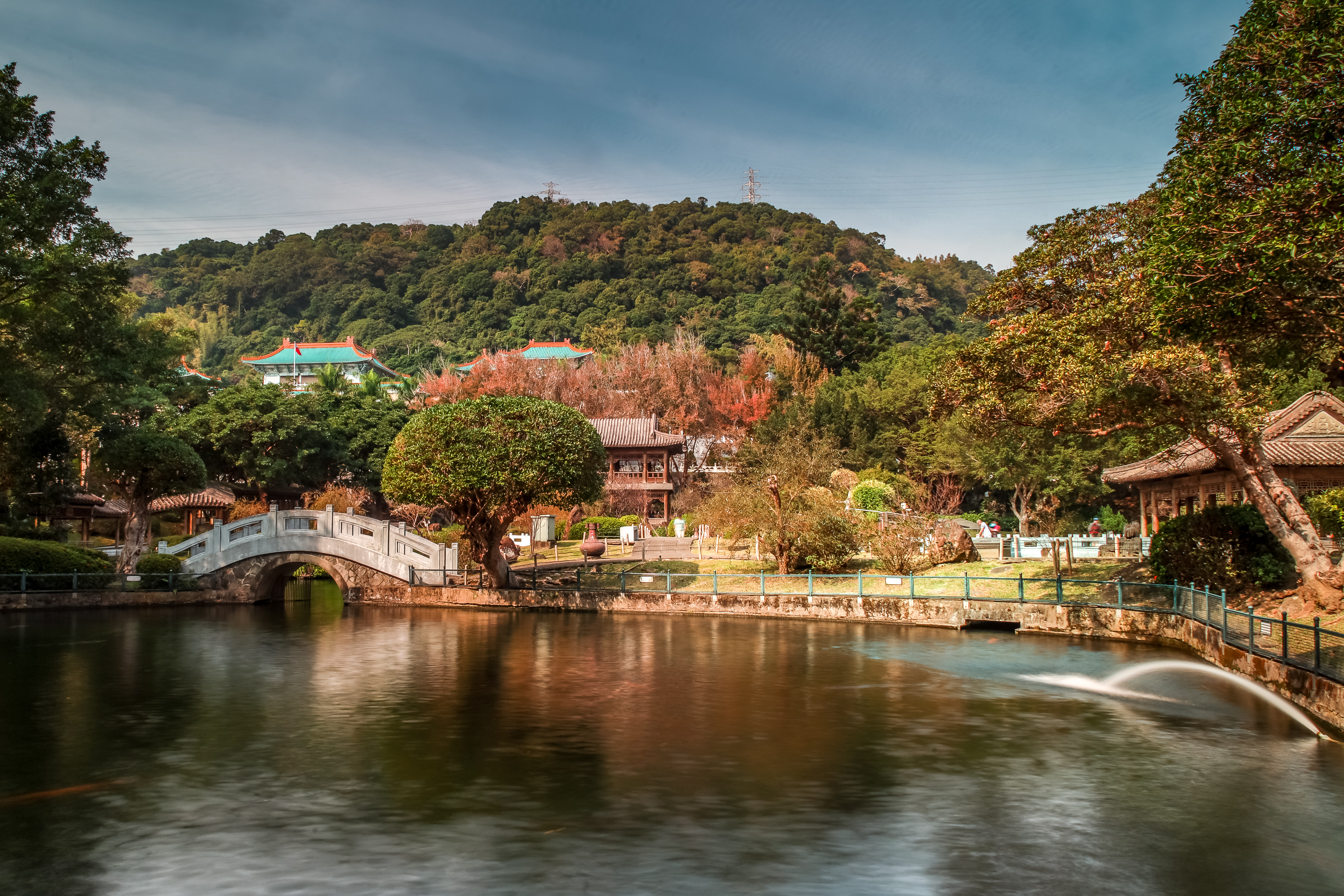
Zhishan Garden

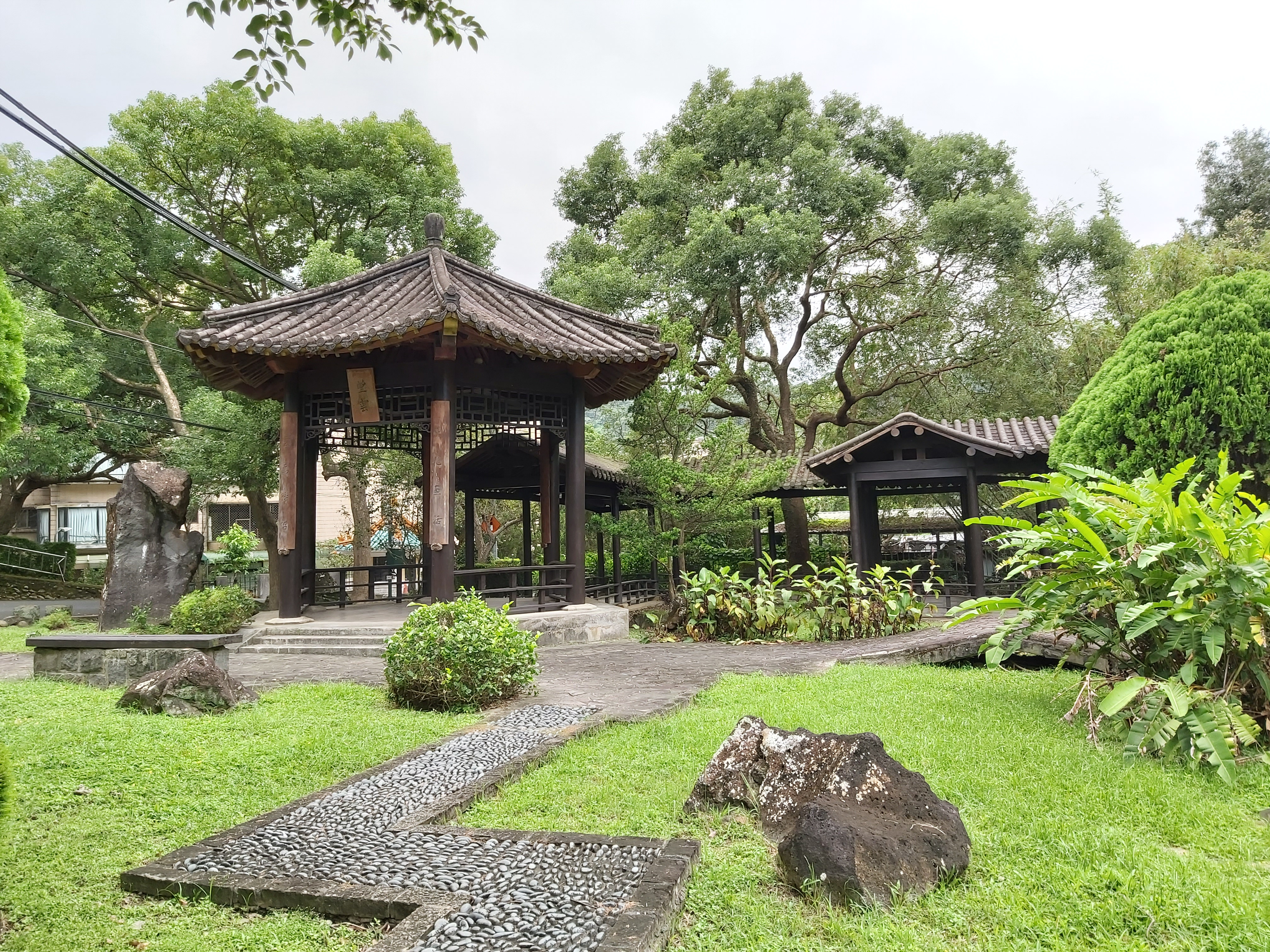
Zhide Garden

Housed within the compound of the National Palace Museum, this classical Chinese Song and Ming style garden covers 1.88 hectares (18,800 m^{2}). It incorporates the principles of such diverse fields as feng shui, Chinese architecture, water management, landscape design, and Chinese folklore and metaphor. It contains numerous ponds, waterworks, and wooden Chinese pavilions. It was completed and opened in 1985. There is also a second garden located on the southwest side, known as the Zhide Garden.

==== Chang Dai-chien residence ====
The National Palace Museum also maintains the residence of Chinese painter Chang Dai-chien, also in Shilin, Taipei. The residence, known as the Chang Dai-chien Residence or the Abode of Maya, was constructed in 1976 and completed in 1978. It is a two-story Siheyuan building with Chinese-style gardens occupying approximately 1,911 m^{2}. After Chang's death in 1983, the house and gardens were donated to the National Palace Museum and turned into a museum and memorial.

=== Southern Branch ===
The Southern Branch of the National Palace Museum is located in Taibao, Chiayi County, Taiwan, and set on 70 hectares (700,000 m^{2}) of land. There is also a lake and Asian style garden on the grounds. Planning for the southern branch began in 2000. The building was to be designed by architect Antoine Predock and began construction in 2005. However, due to serious construction delays and disputes between the contractors and the museum, the firm pulled out in 2008. Museum director Chou Kung-shin stated in August 2010 that new architects Kris Yao for the project would commence, with construction completed in 2015. The project cost NT$7.9 billion (US$268 million) and spread over 70 hectares (700,000 m^{2}). The museum itself, 9,000 square meters in total, was designed by the Taiwan-based firm Artech Inc. and is both earthquake resistant and flood resistant. After its grand opening on 28 December 2015, the building was plagued by water leakage, which forced its closure in April 2016. The Southern Branch then reopened on 23 August 2016, after repairs to address the water leakage issues were completed.

== Collections ==
Collections (as of December 2025)
Categories	Numbers
Bronzes	6,280
Ceramics	25,623
Jades	13,589
Lacquerwares	773
Enamel wares	2,520
Carvings	672
Studio implements	2,379
Coins	6,958
Miscellaneous objects (religious implements, costumes and a ccessories, and snuff bottles)	12,515
Paintings	6,762
Calligraphic works	3,745
Calligraphic model books	495
Tapestries and embroideries	308
Fans	1,882
Rubbings	902
Rare books	216,539
Qing archival documents	395,551
Textiles	1,626
Total	699,119

According to official reports, the museum houses Chinese calligraphy, porcelain, bronzes, paintings, jades and many other artifacts. A large number of these items were brought to Taiwan during the retreat of the ROC government. These include approximately 22% (2,972 out of 13,491) of the crates originally transported south from the Forbidden City, along with 852 crates of items from the National Central Museum. Together, these two sources constitute a collection of 608,985 cultural relics. Through additional transfers, donations, and purchases, the museum has accumulated nearly 700,000 artifacts of significant historical or artistic value. With a collection of this size, only 1% is exhibited at any given time, while the remainder is stored in temperature-controlled vaults.

The museum houses several treasured items that are the pride of their collection and famous worldwide. The antiquities in the National Palace Museum span over thousands of years with a variety of genres.

=== Metalwork ===
Among the collections of bronzes, Zong Zhou Zhong (Bell of Zhou), commissioned by King Li of Zhou, is the most important musical instrument cast under his royal decree. Mao Gong Ding (Cauldron of Duke of Mao) of the late Western Zhou dynasty (1046–771 BCE) carries the longest Chinese bronze inscriptions so far extant.

In 1995, the museum acquired the Taihe Shakyamuni, a statue of The Buddha from the Northern Wei Dynasty, that represents a pivotal shift from early Indian style towards Chinese Buddhist style.

=== Ceramics ===
With 21 pieces out of fewer than a hundred surviving, the museum has the world's largest collection of Ru ware, one of the rarest Chinese ceramics, made exclusively for the court and one of the Five Great Kilns of the Song dynasty (960–1279), along with Ding porcelain, Jun ware, Guan and Ge; the museum has major collections of all of these. Those from the official kilns of the Ming (1368–1644) and Qing (1644–1912) dynasties, such as the doucai porcelains of the Chenghua reign during the Ming dynasty and painted enamel porcelains from the early Qing, are also of excellent quality.

=== Carvings ===
One of the most popular pieces of jade carvings in the museum is the Jadeite Cabbage, a piece of jadeite carved into the shape of a cabbage head, and with a large and a small grasshopper camouflaged in the leaves. The ruffled semi-translucent leaves attached is due to the masterful combination of various natural color of the jade to recreate the color variations of a real cabbage. The Meat-shaped Stone is often exhibited together with the Jadeite Cabbage. A piece of jasper, a form of agate, the strata of which are cleverly used to create a likeness of a piece of pork cooked in soy sauce. The dyed and textured surface makes the layers of skin, lean meat, and fat materialized incredibly lifelike.

Other various carvings of materials such as bamboo, wood, ivory, rhinoceros horn, and fruit pits are exhibited. The Carved Olive-stone Boat, carved by Chen Zuzhang, is a tiny boat carved from an olive stone. The incredibly fully equipped skilled piece is carved with a covered deck and moveable windows. The interior has chairs, dishes on a table and eight figures representing the characters of Su Shih's Latter Ode on the Red Cliff. The bottom is carved in minute character the entire 300+ character text with the date and the artist's name.

=== Painting and calligraphy ===
The paintings in the National Palace Museum date from the Tang dynasty (618–907) to the modern era. The collection covers over one thousand years of Chinese painting, and encompasses a wide range of genres, including landscape, flower and bird, figure painting, boundary painting, etc. Among the most popular paintings in the collection is the Qing Palace Version of Along the River During the Qingming Festival by five Qing dynasty court painters (Chen Mu, Sun Hu, Jin Kun, Dai Hong and Cheng Zhidao). Dwelling in the Fuchun Mountains (Wu-yung version) by Huang Gongwang of the Yuan dynasty is one of the rarest and most dramatic works. Walking on a Mountain Path in Spring is another significant work. The museum has a vast collection of calligraphy works from the hands of major calligraphers, scholars and important courtiers in history. The calligraphy works date from the Jin (266–420) and Tang (618–907) dynasties, with a variety of styles.

=== Rare books and documents ===
Rare books in the National Palace Museum range from the Song (960–1279) and Yuan (1271–1368) dynasties to the Ming (1368–1644) and Qing (1644–1912) dynasties, amounting to over 200,000 volumes. Yongle Encyclopedia and Complete Library of the Four Treasuries are among the examples.

Historical documents in the museum include Jiu Manzhou Dang, a set of Manchu archives that are the sourcebook of Manwen Laodang and a primary source of early Manchu history. Other official documents such as the court archives are available for research in the history of the Qing dynasty.

== Administration ==
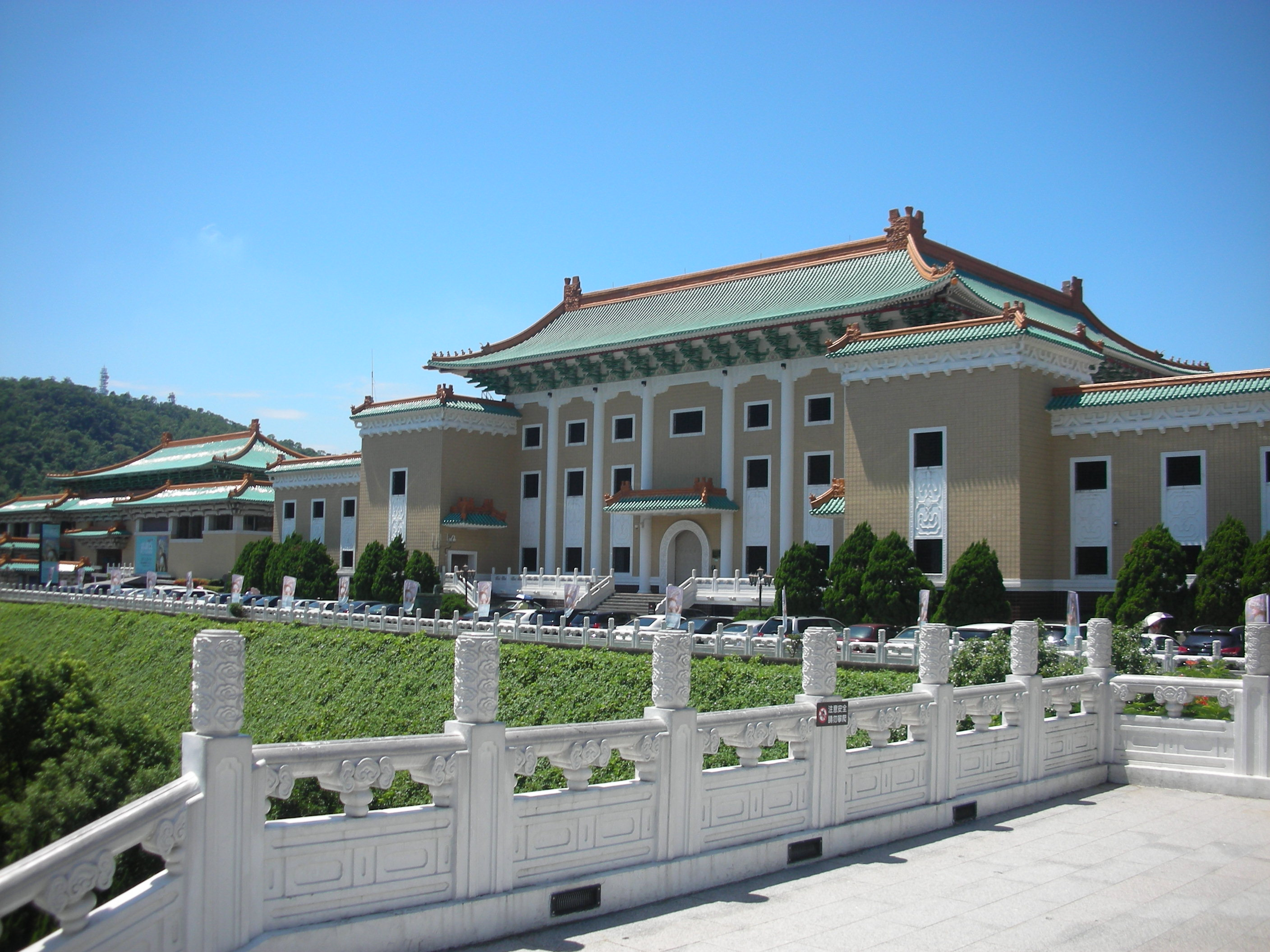
Administration building of the Northern Branch of National Palace Museum

The National Palace Museum operates under the Executive Yuan as a level-two agency. It has been headed by many directors over the years: Note that, in 1949, the Joint Managerial Office of the National Central Museum and National Central Library was established. In 1955, the Joint Managerial Office of the National Palace Museum and National Central Museum was established.

=== List of directors ===
Name	Term begin	Term end
Directors of Palace Museum
Li Yü-ying	First appointed Director-General	
I P'ei-chi	October 1925	October 1933
Ma Heng	October 1933	August 1949
Directors of National Central Museum Preparatory Office
Fu Ssu-nien	1933	1934
Li Chi	1934	1949
Directors of the Joint Managerial Office of the National Palace Museum and National Central Museum
Hang Li-wu	September 1949	June 1956
K'ung Te-ch'eng	July 1956	April 1964
Ho Lien-k'uei	May 1964	August 1965
Directors of National Palace Museum
Chiang Fu-ts'ung	September 1965	January 1983
Ch'in Hsiao-yi	January 1983	May 2000
Tu Cheng-sheng	20 May 2000	20 May 2004
Shih Shou-chien	20 May 2004	25 January 2006
Lin Mun-lee	25 January 2006	20 May 2008
Chou Kung-shin	20 May 2008	29 July 2012
Chou Chu-kun (acting)	30 July 2012	18 September 2012
Feng Ming-chu	18 September 2012	19 May 2016
Lin Jeng-yi	20 May 2016	15 July 2018
Chen Chi-nan	16 July 2018	13 January 2019
Lee Ching-hui (acting)	14 January 2019	14 February 2019
Wu Mi-cha	15 February 2019	30 January 2023
Hsiao Tsung-huang	31 January 2023	Incumbent

== Controversies ==
=== Ownership disputes ===
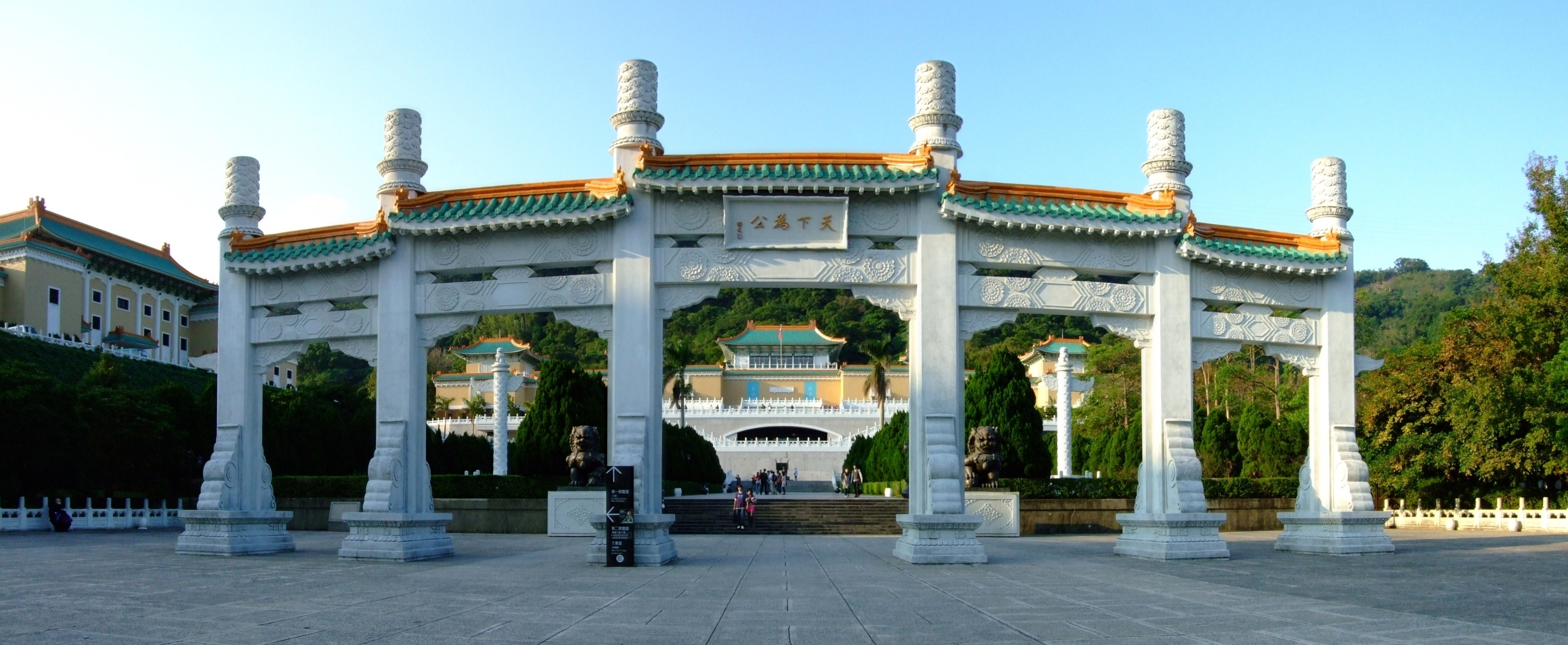
Paifang of the Northern Branch of National Palace Museum

The legal ownership of the National Palace Museum's collection remains a subject of cross-strait political sensitivity. The People's Republic of China (PRC) has insisted that these treasures were illegally removed during the Chinese Civil War, and that Taiwan's claim of ownership is unjustifiable. Within Taiwan, some proponents of Taiwanese independence also argue that the collection does not rightfully belong to Taiwan and should be returned to China, as they do not view these artifacts as representative of Taiwanese culture. Instead of pursuing formal legal action, the PRC has emphasized a shared cultural heritage jointly owned by people across the Taiwan Strait. This was highlighted during a period of warmer relations when the Palace Museum in Beijing and the National Palace Museum in Taipei engaged in several collaborative exhibitions and personnel exchanges, including the lending of relics from Beijing to Taipei.

The National Palace Museum in Taipei asserts its status as the legal custodian of the collection. Due to concerns that the artifacts might be impounded or claimed by the PRC because of the controversial political status of Taiwan, the museum does not hold exhibitions in mainland China. Since its establishment in Taipei in 1965, the National Palace Museum has only held large-scale overseas exhibitions in countries that have passed laws preventing the judicial seizure of its treasures. These countries include the United States, France, Germany, Austria, Japan, Australia, and the Czech Republic. One of the most significant and debated exhibitions was the 1996 U.S. tour, which featured 452 items exhibited at the Metropolitan Museum of Art, the Art Institute of Chicago, the Asian Art Museum of San Francisco, and the National Gallery of Art in Washington, D.C. Recent exhibitions include those at the National Museum in Prague and the Musée du Quai Branly – Jacques Chirac in Paris in 2025.

=== Safety concerns ===
The safety and preservation of the National Palace Museum's collection have frequently been the subject of intense political and public scrutiny. Critics have pointed to the 2022 breakage of three Ming and Qing dynasty artifacts as evidence of institutional negligence and a lack of transparency in reporting accidents. Beyond accidental damage, the museum's vulnerability to military conflict remains a flashpoint for debate. While some experts advocate for the reactivation of mountain tunnels used for emergency storage, others maintain that "staying put" is the most secure arrangement. In 2022, the museum held its first "wartime response exercise" to train staff on evacuation procedures. The museum declined to share details of the protocols, calling them "top secret", though US broadcaster CNN reported that the exercise focused on a high-priority list of approximately 90,000 masterpieces from the collection of nearly 700,000 items.

Further controversy emerged in March 2023 when it was revealed that thousands of high-resolution digital images of the museum's collection had been leaked and were being sold on Chinese e-commerce platforms, sparking fresh criticism over the institution's information security and administrative management.

== Gallery ==
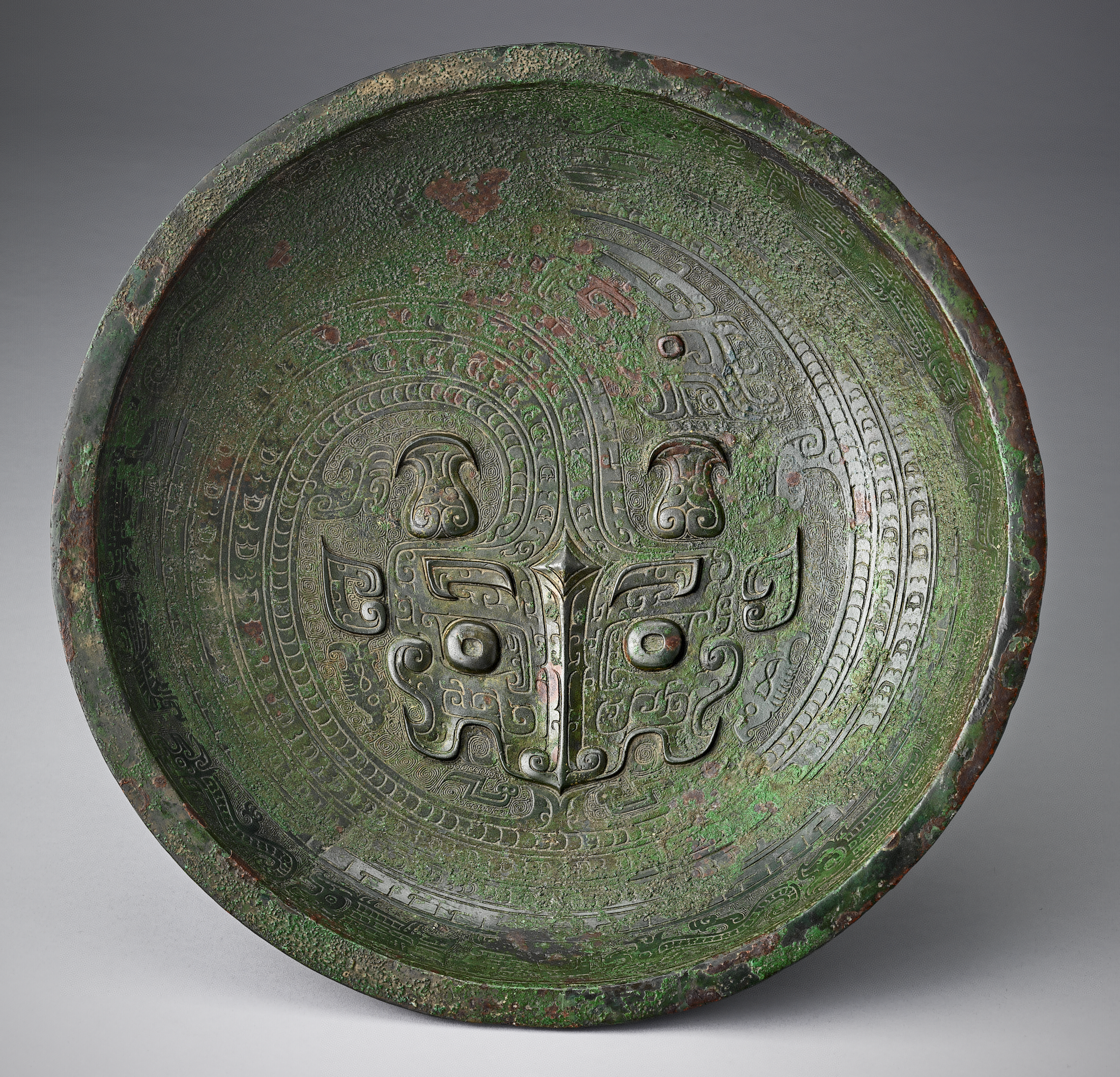
The Pan water vessel with coiling dragon pattern, c. 14th – mid 11th century BC

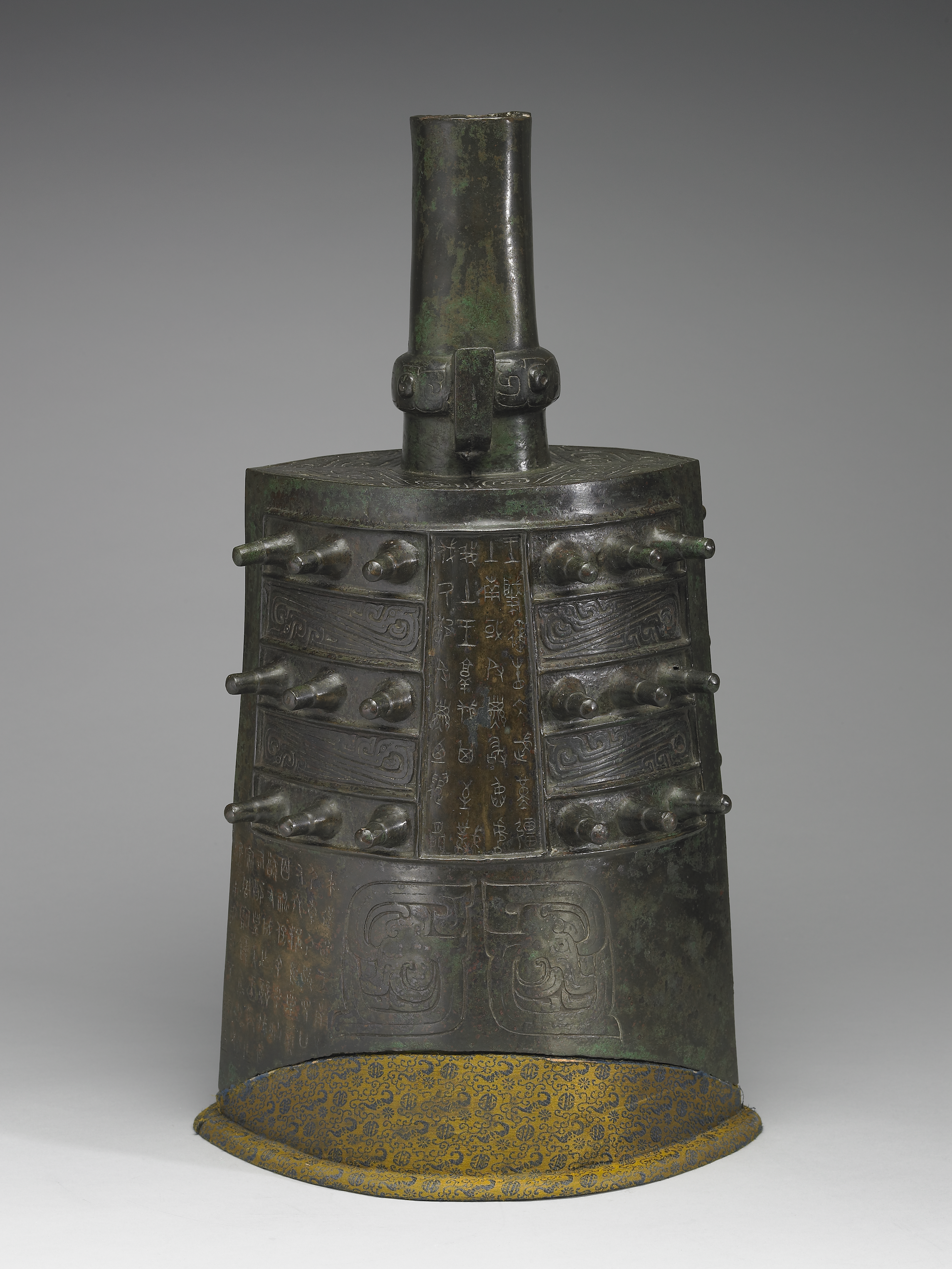
The Zong-zhou Zhong (Bell of Zhou), 9th century BC

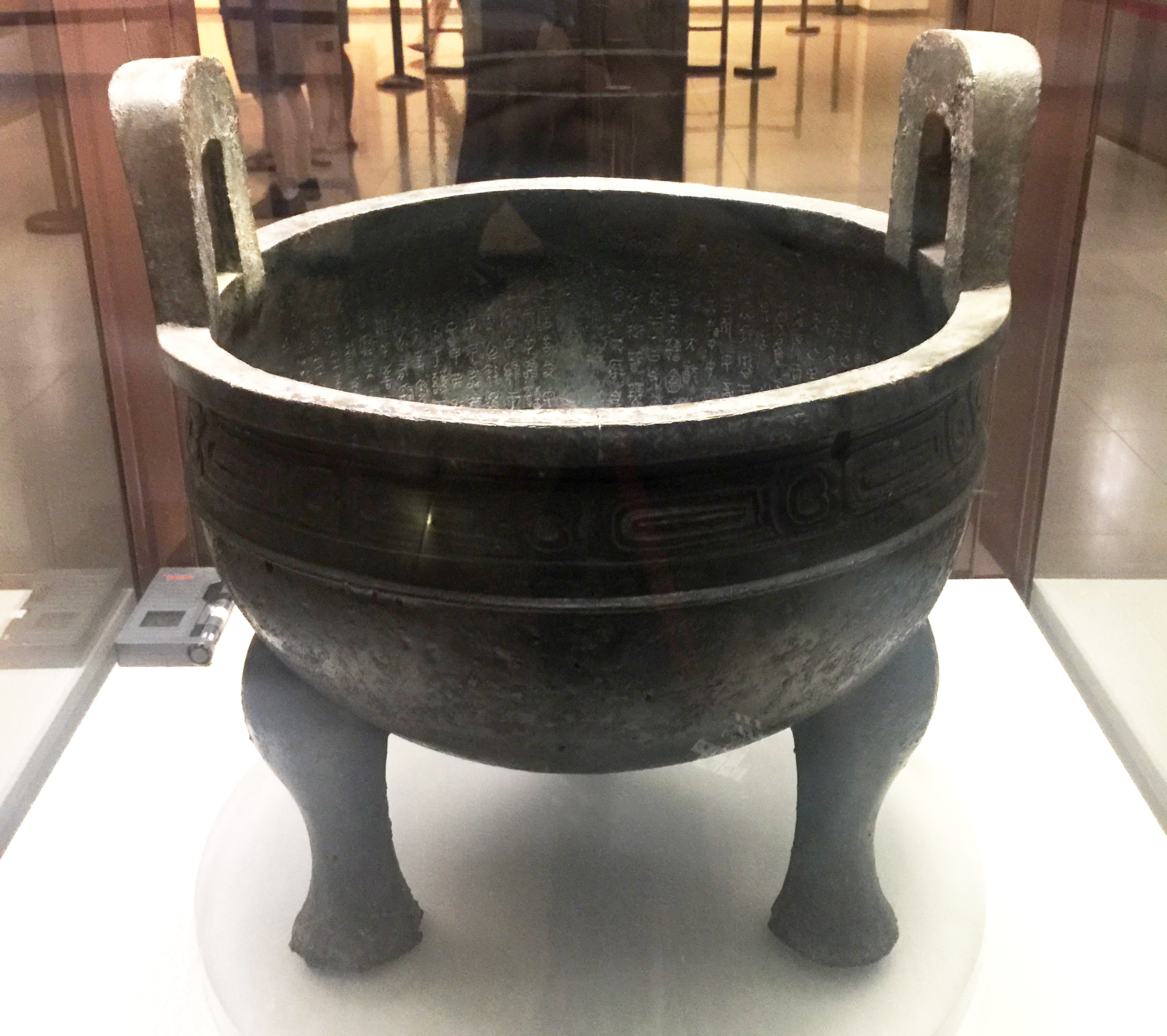
The Mao Gong ding, 9th century BC

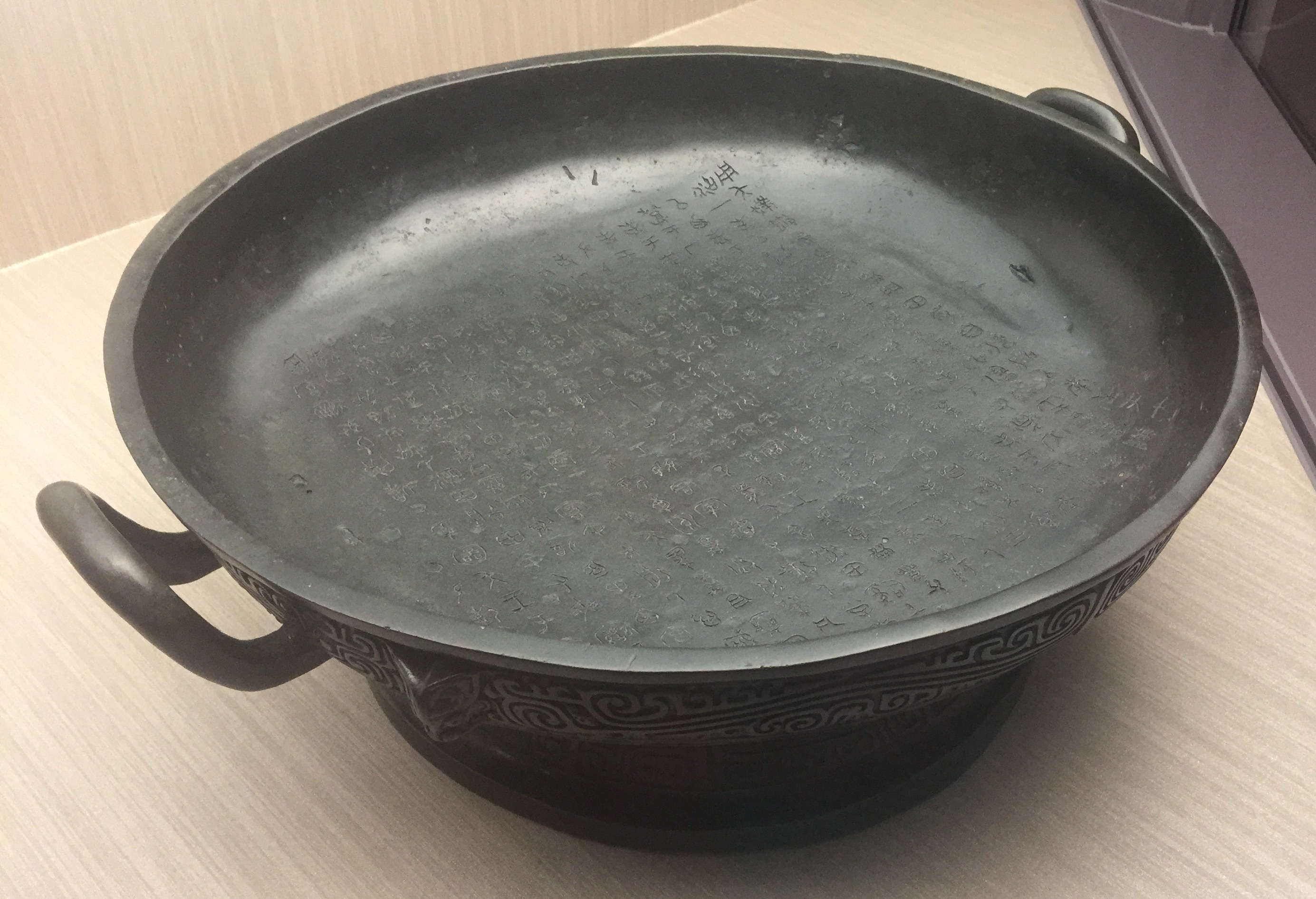
The San Family Plate, 9th century BC

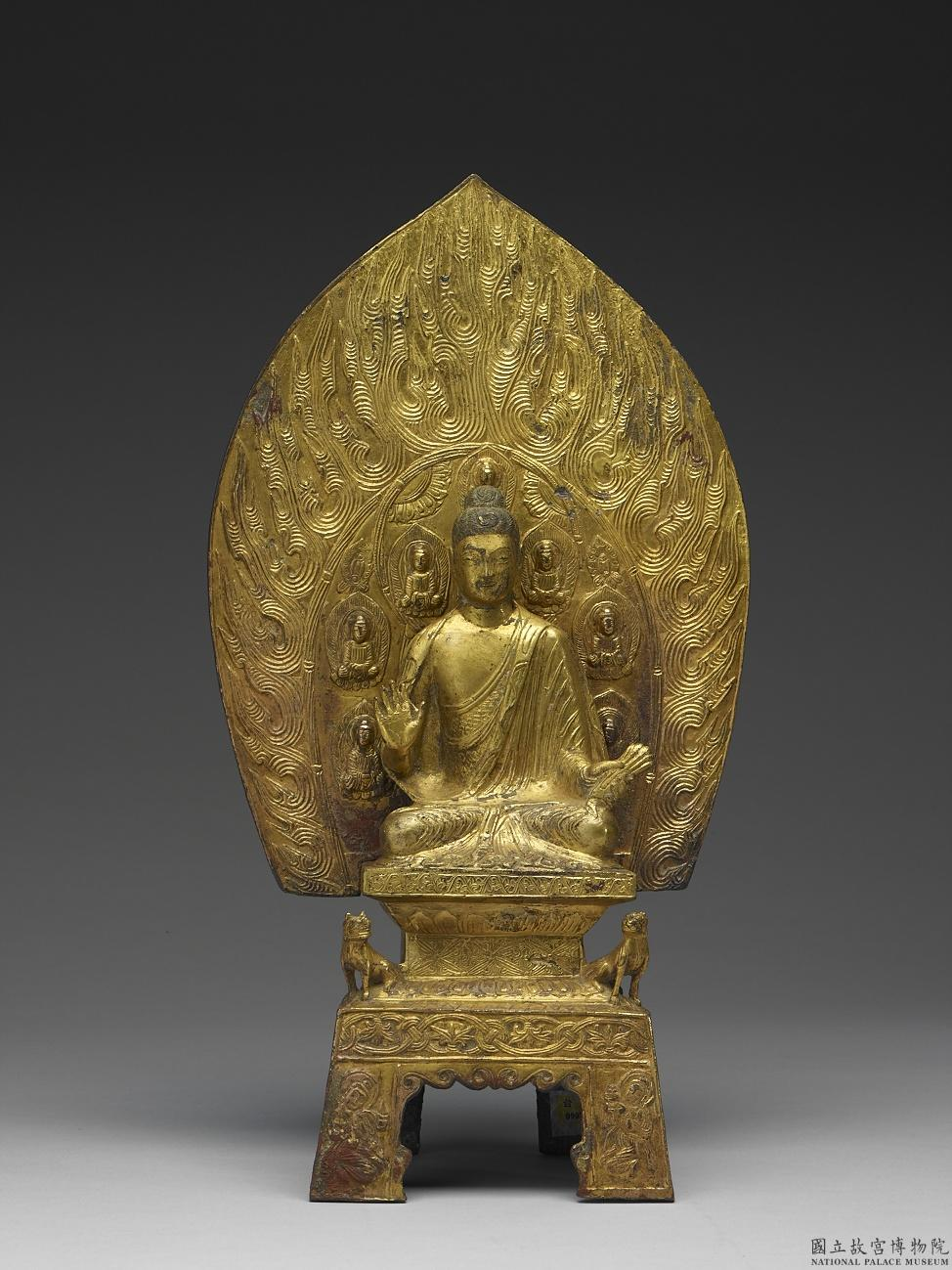
Taihe Shakyamuni, Northern Wei, 477

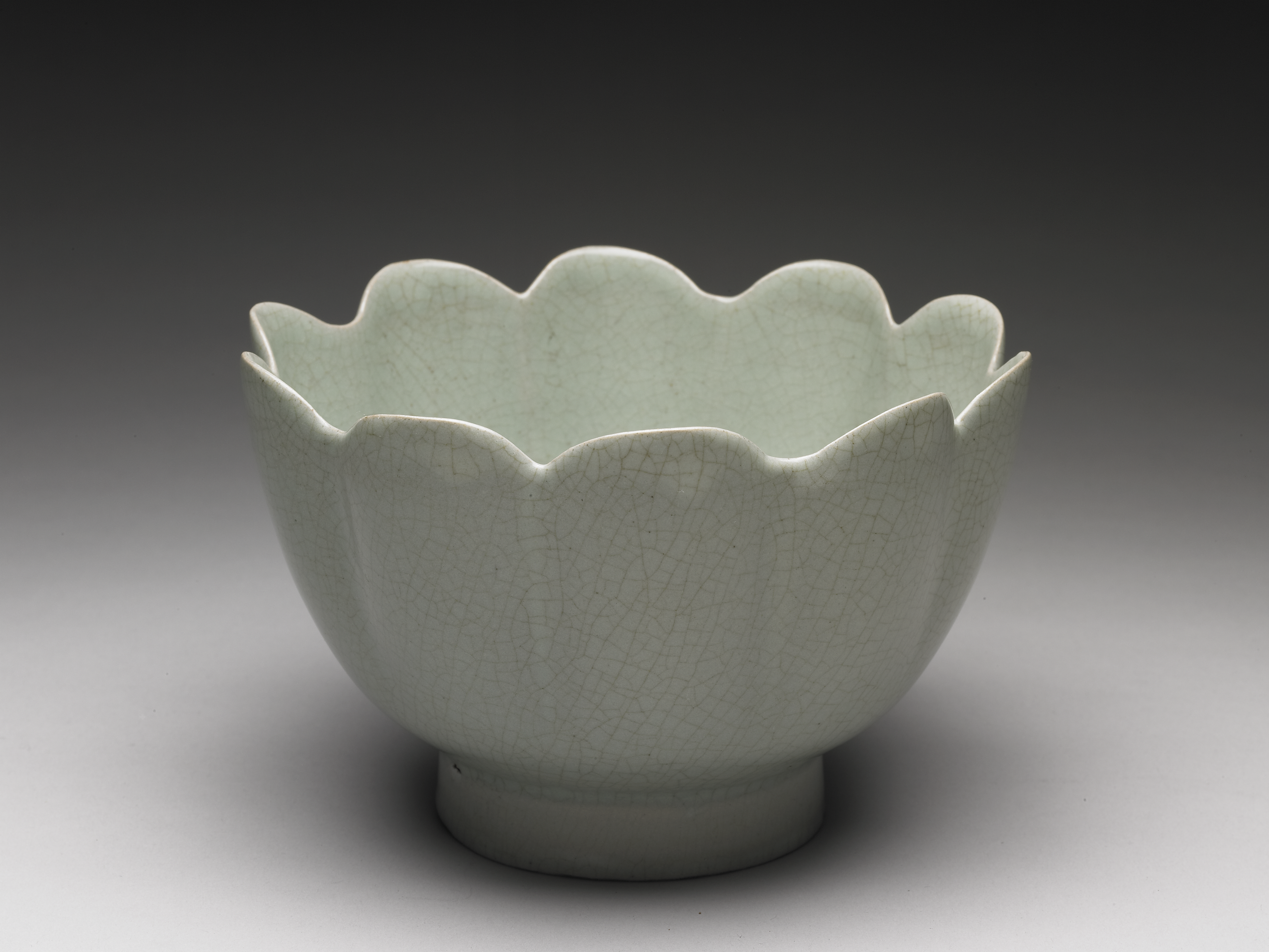
The Warming Bowl in the Shape of a Flower with Light Bluish-green Glaze, Ru ware, c. 1086 – c. 1106

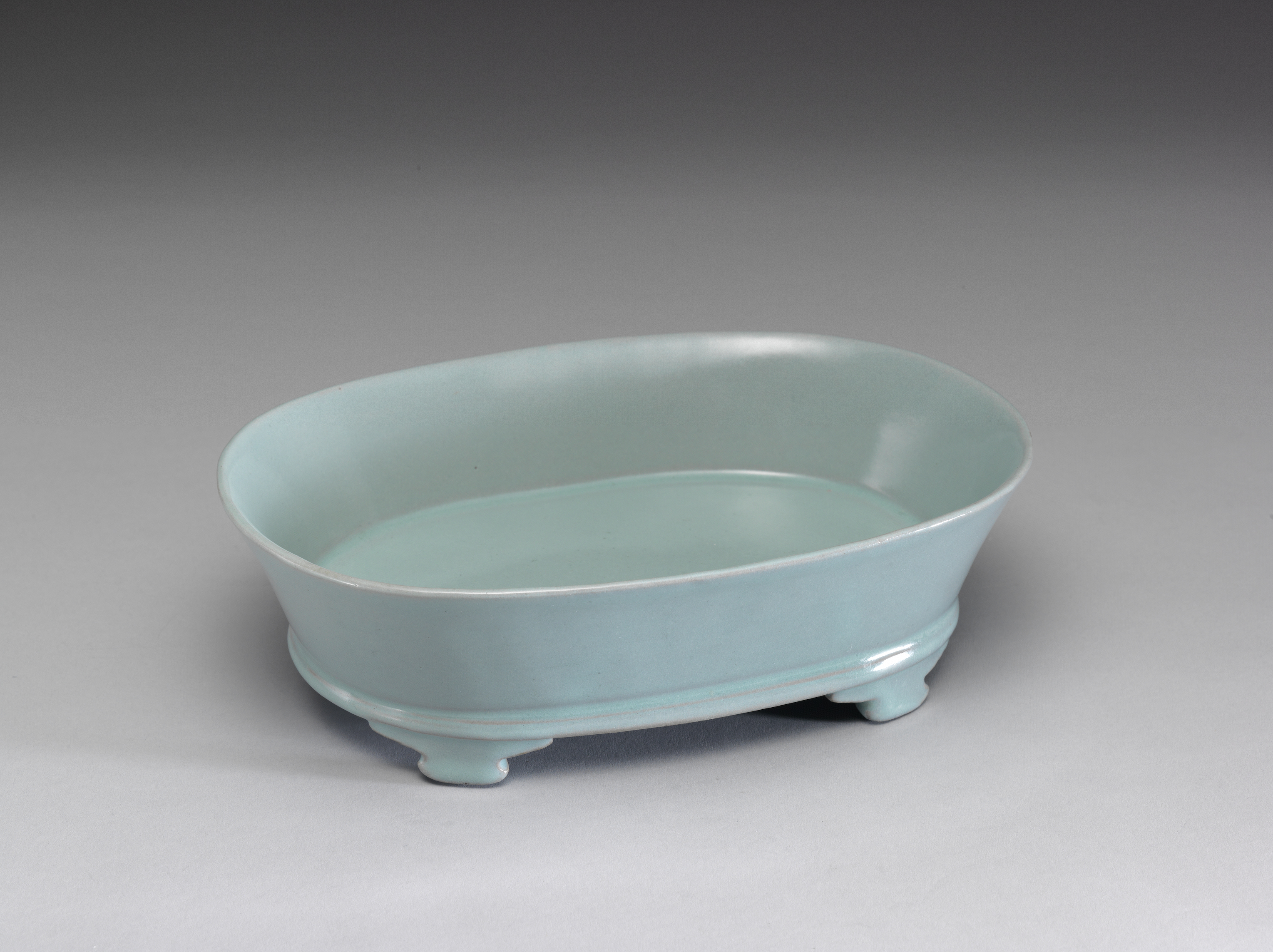
The Narcissus Basin with Light Bluish-green Glaze, Ru ware, c. 1086 – c. 1106

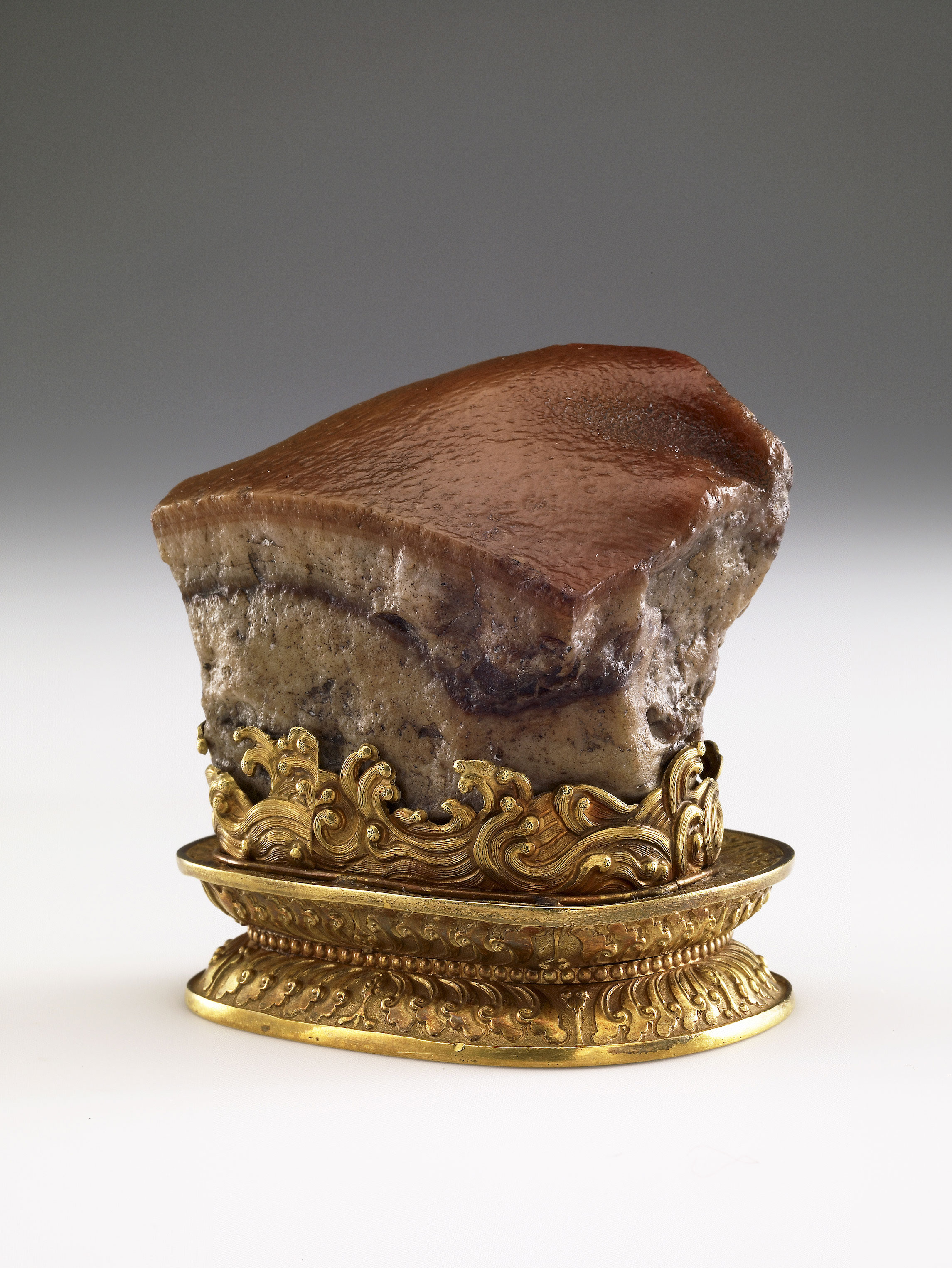
Meat-Shaped Stone, c. 1800 – c. 1900

The Seated Portrait of Emperor Taizu of Song, c. 960–76

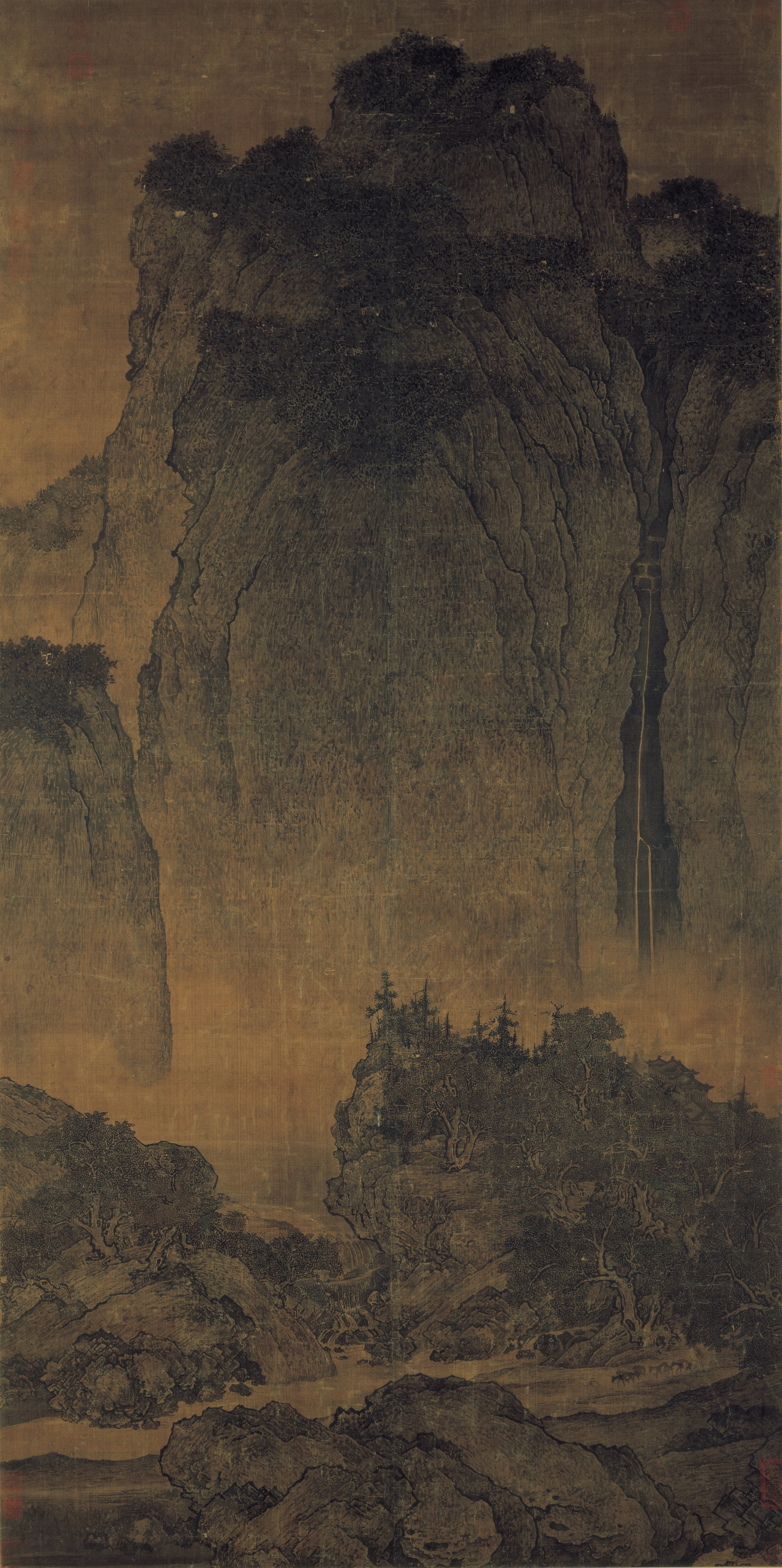
The Travelers Among Mountains and Streams, by Fan Kuan, c. 1000

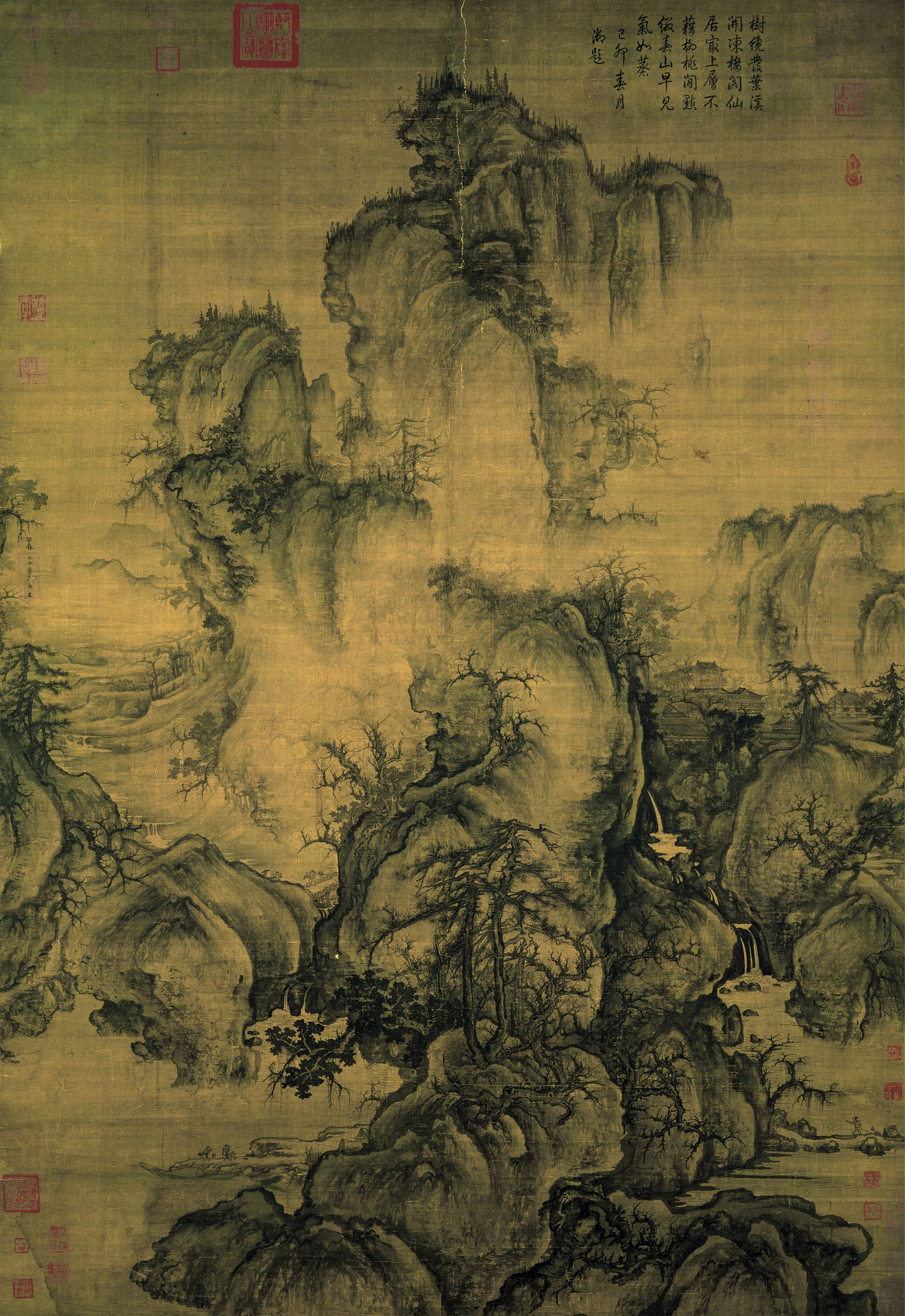
The Early Spring, by Guo Xi, 1072

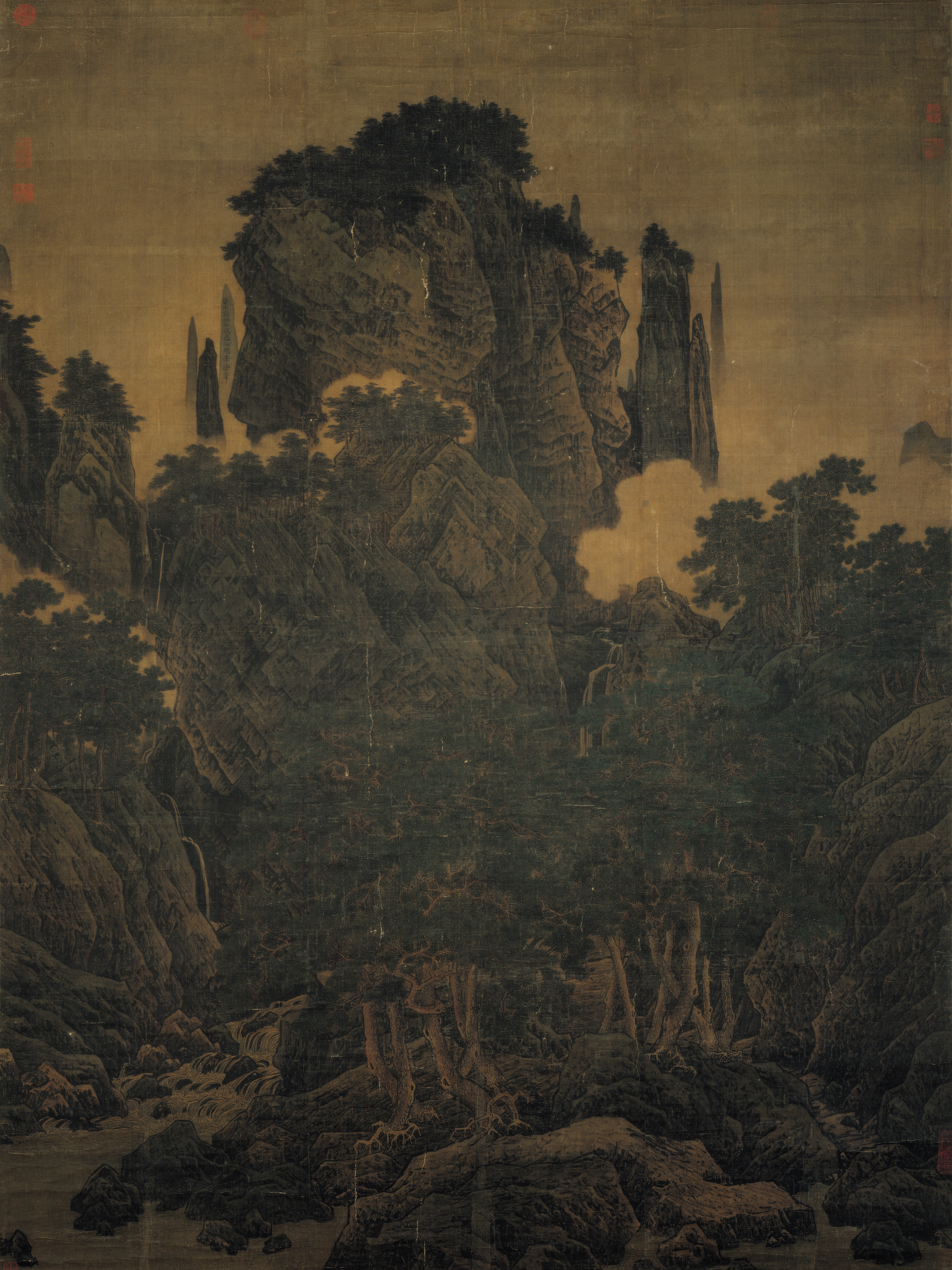
The Wind in Pines Among a Myriad Valleys, by Li Tang, 1124

The Immortal in Splashed Ink, by Liang Kai, c. 1200

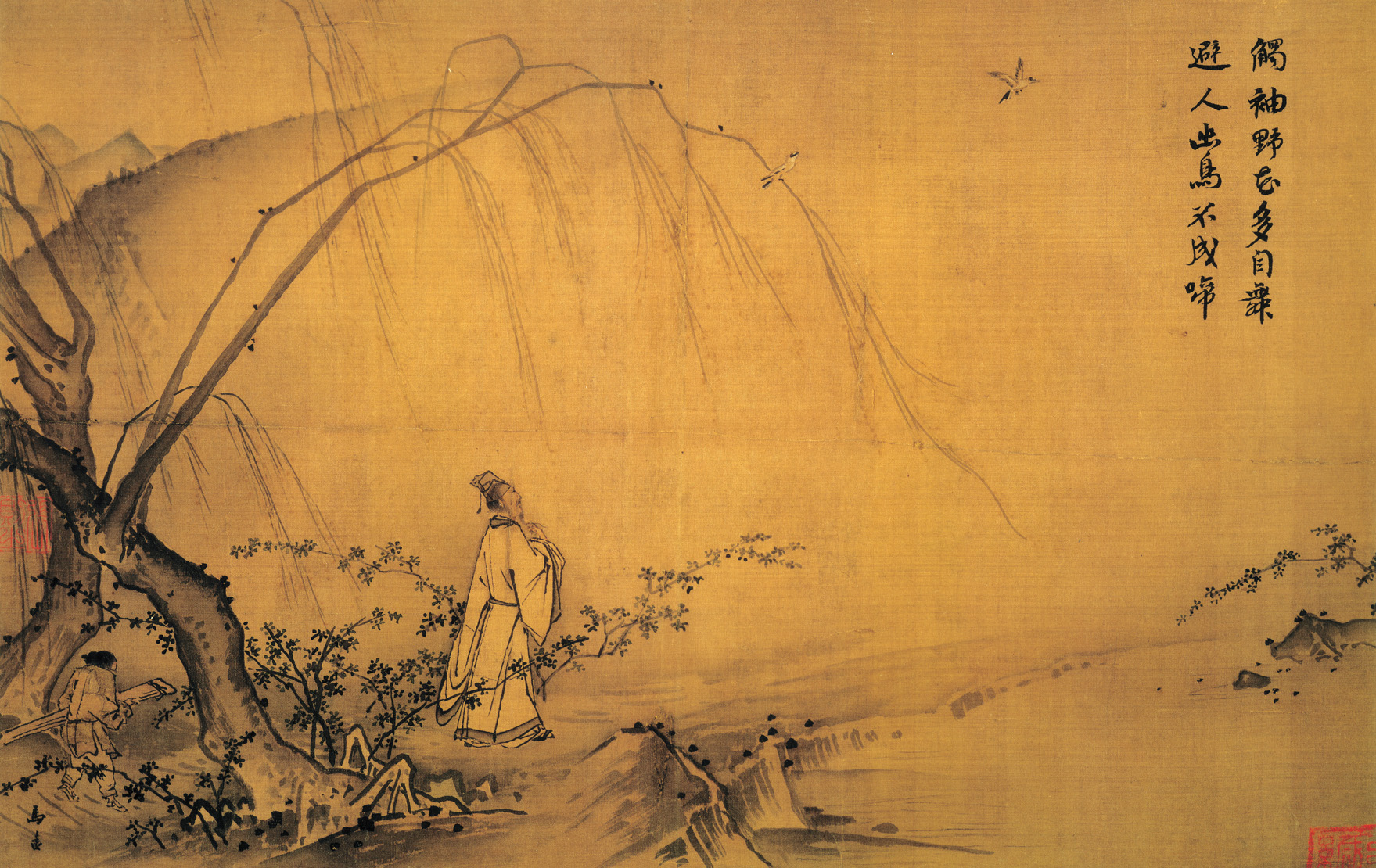
The Walking on a Mountain Path in Spring, by Ma Yuan, 13th century

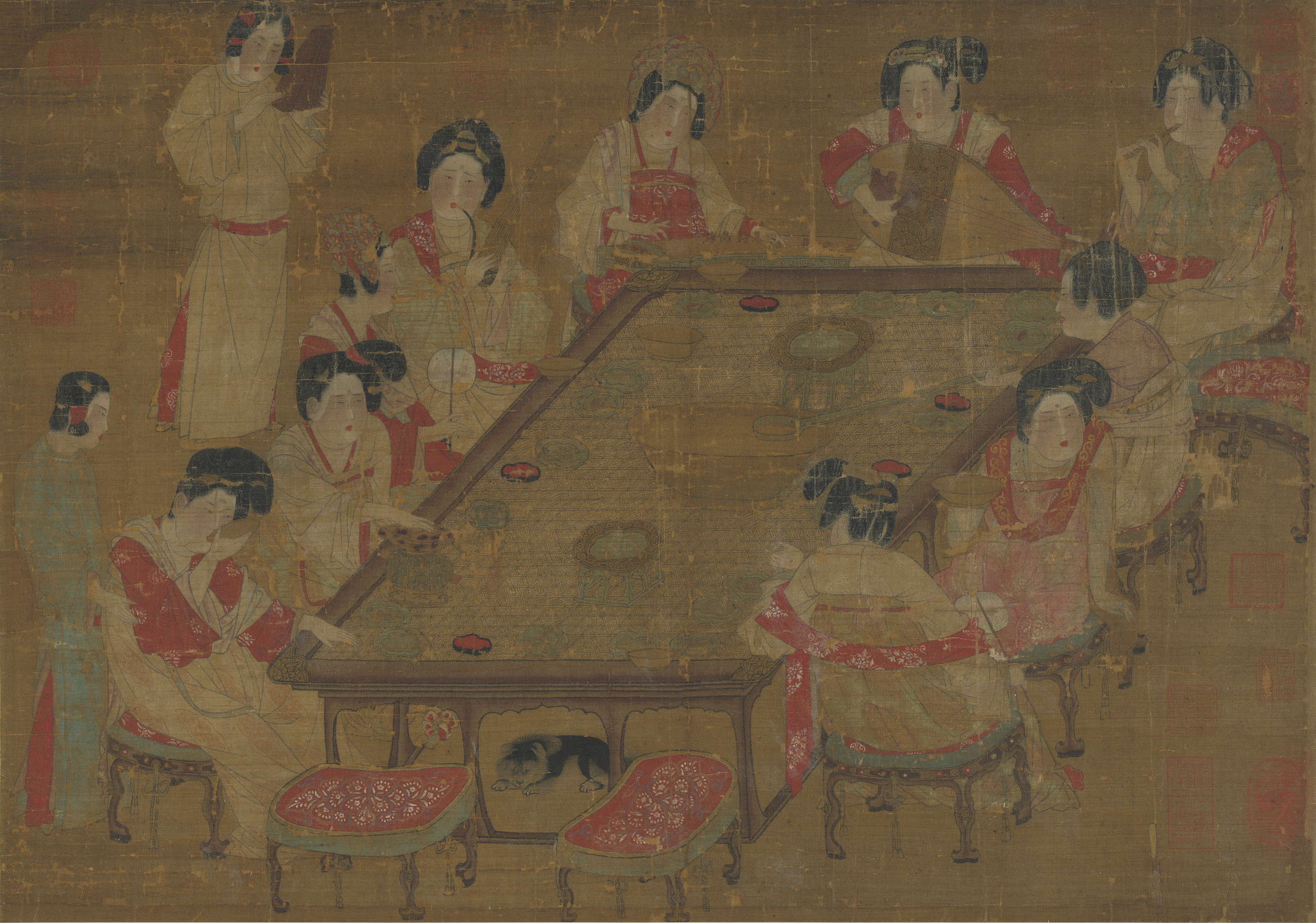
A palace concert, c. 836 – c. 907

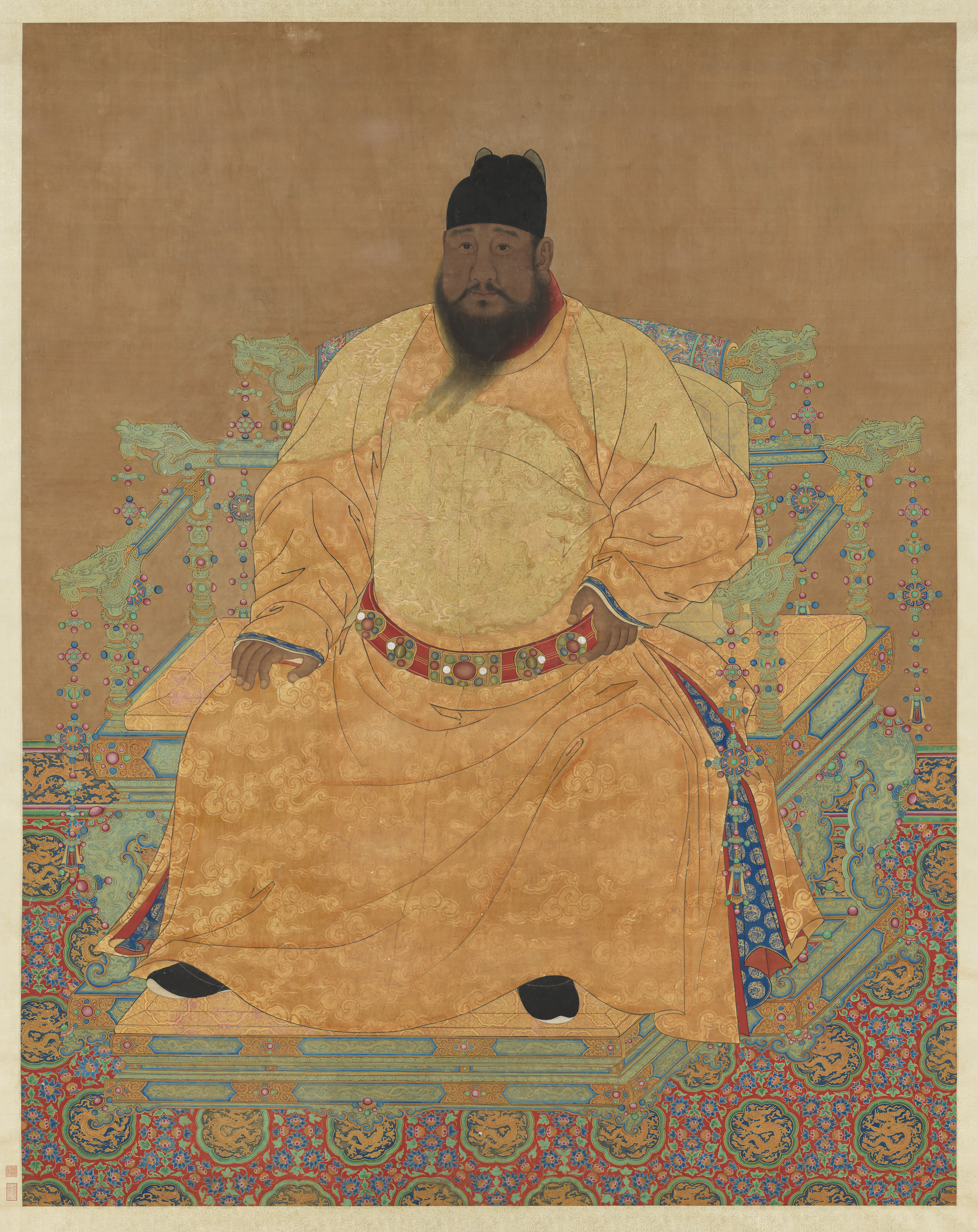
The Seated Portrait of Xuande Emperor, c. 1425–35

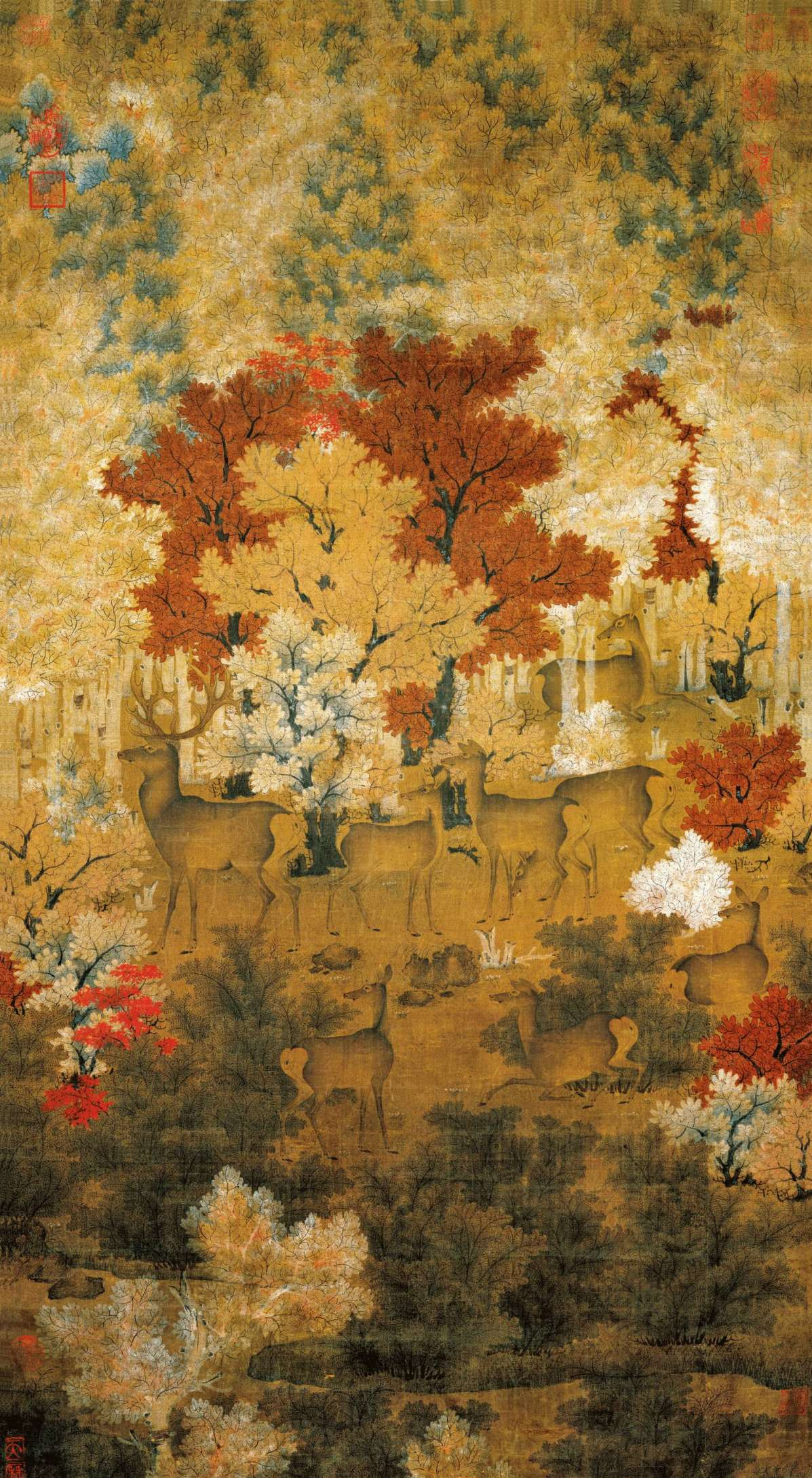
The Herd of Deer in a Maple Grove, c. 1031–48

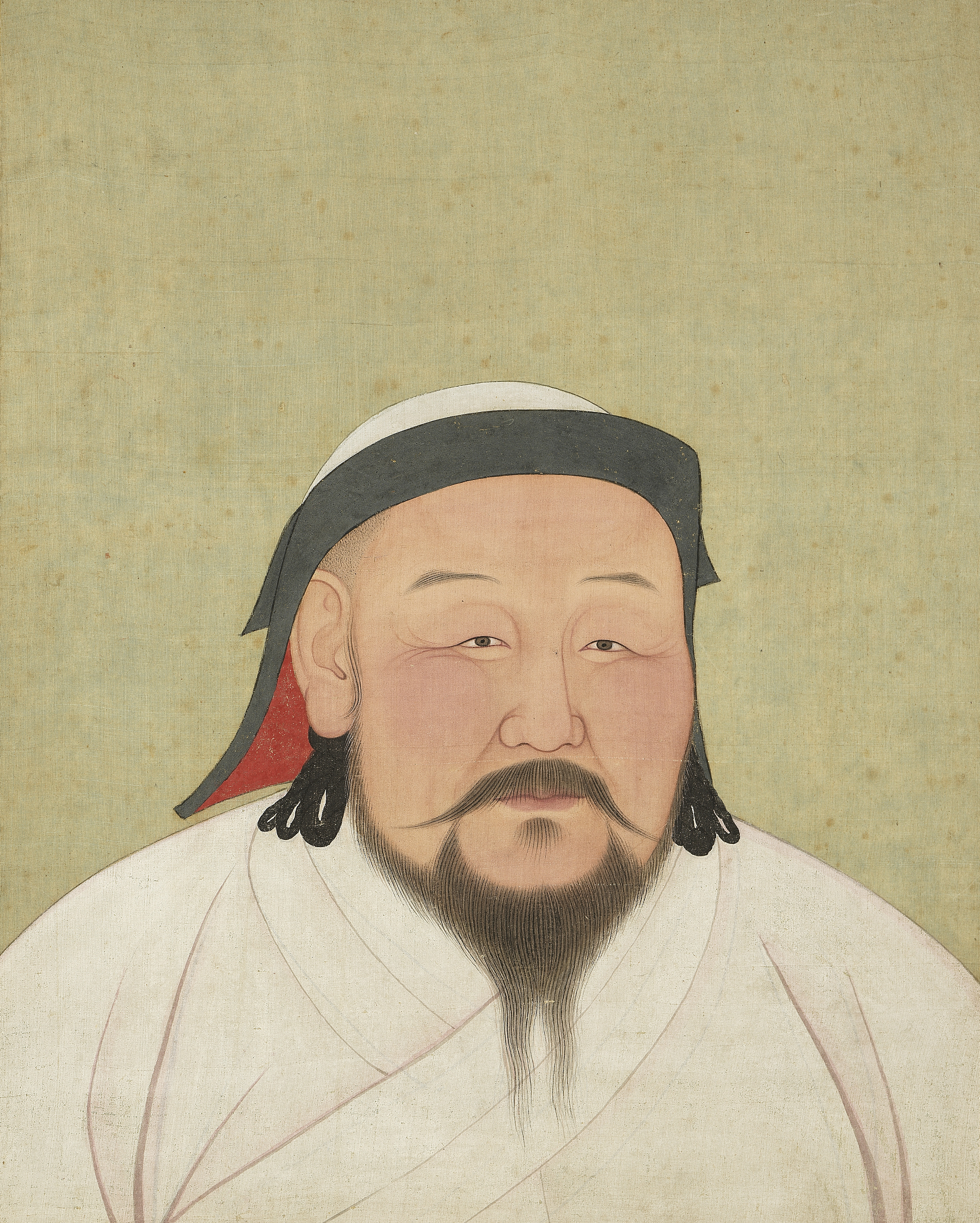
The Portrait of Kublai Khan, by Araniko, c. 1294.

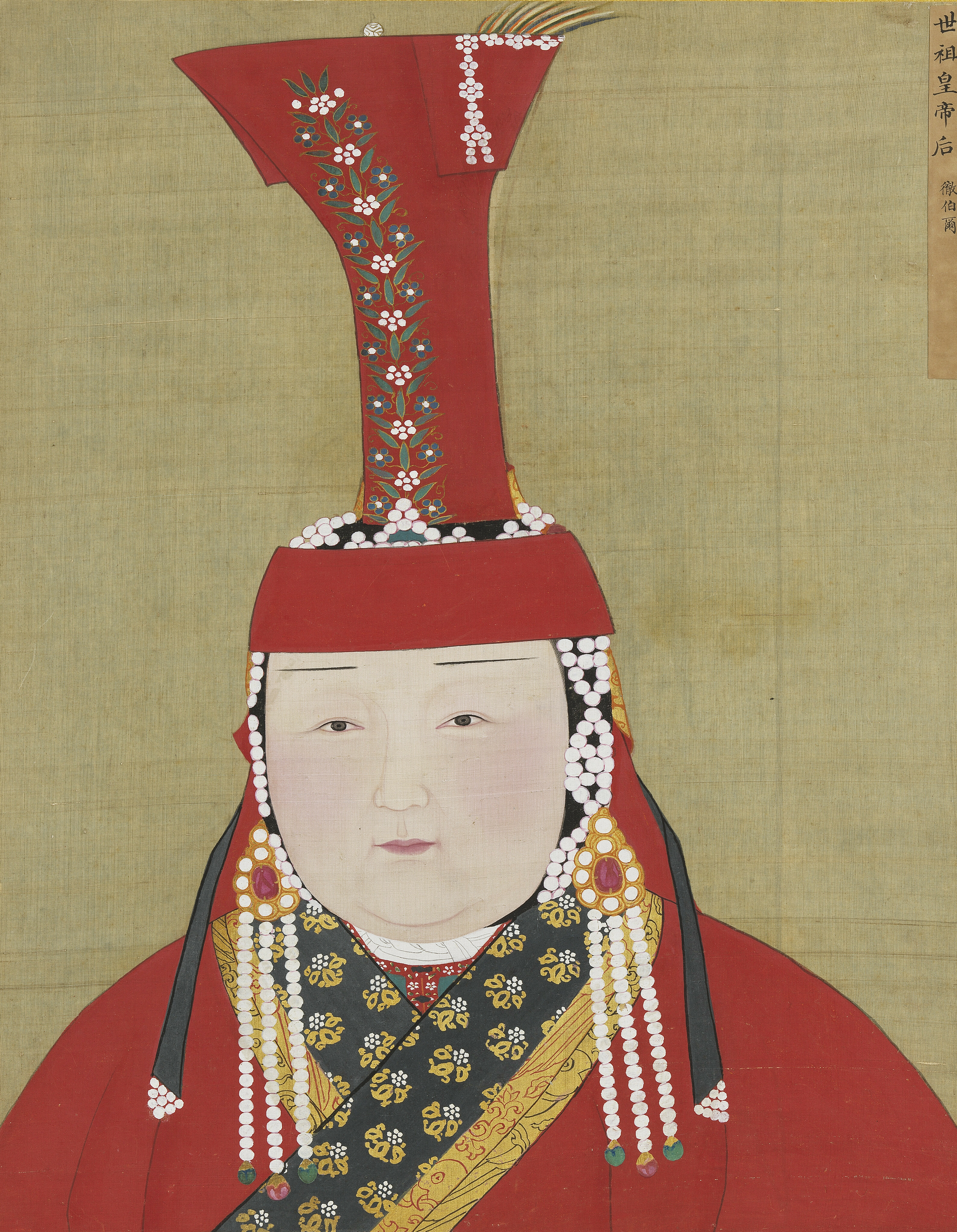
The Portrait of Empress Chabi, c. 1271–81

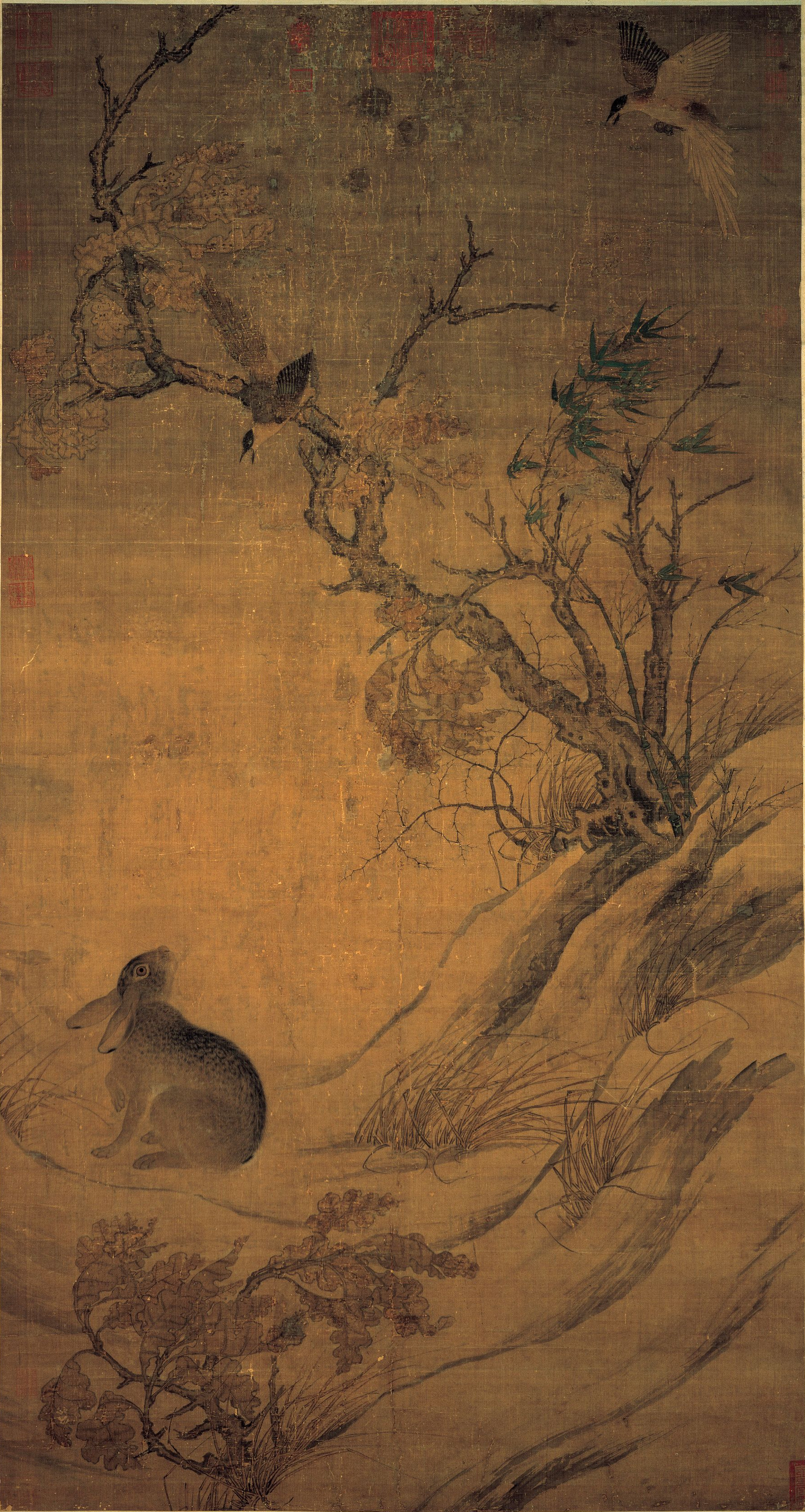
The Magpies and Hare, by Cui Bai, 1061

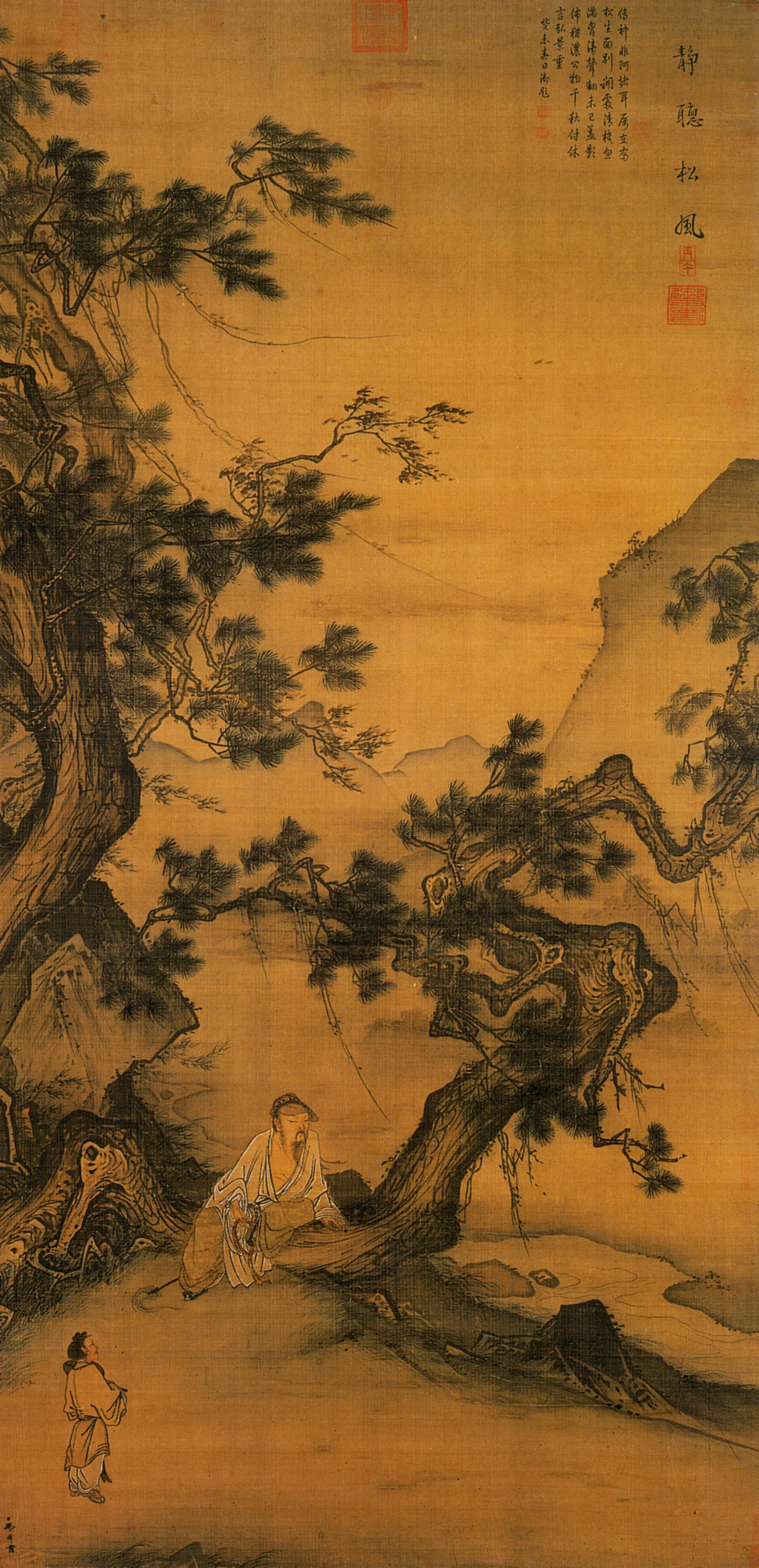
The Listening Quietly to Soughing Pines, by Ma Lin, 13th century

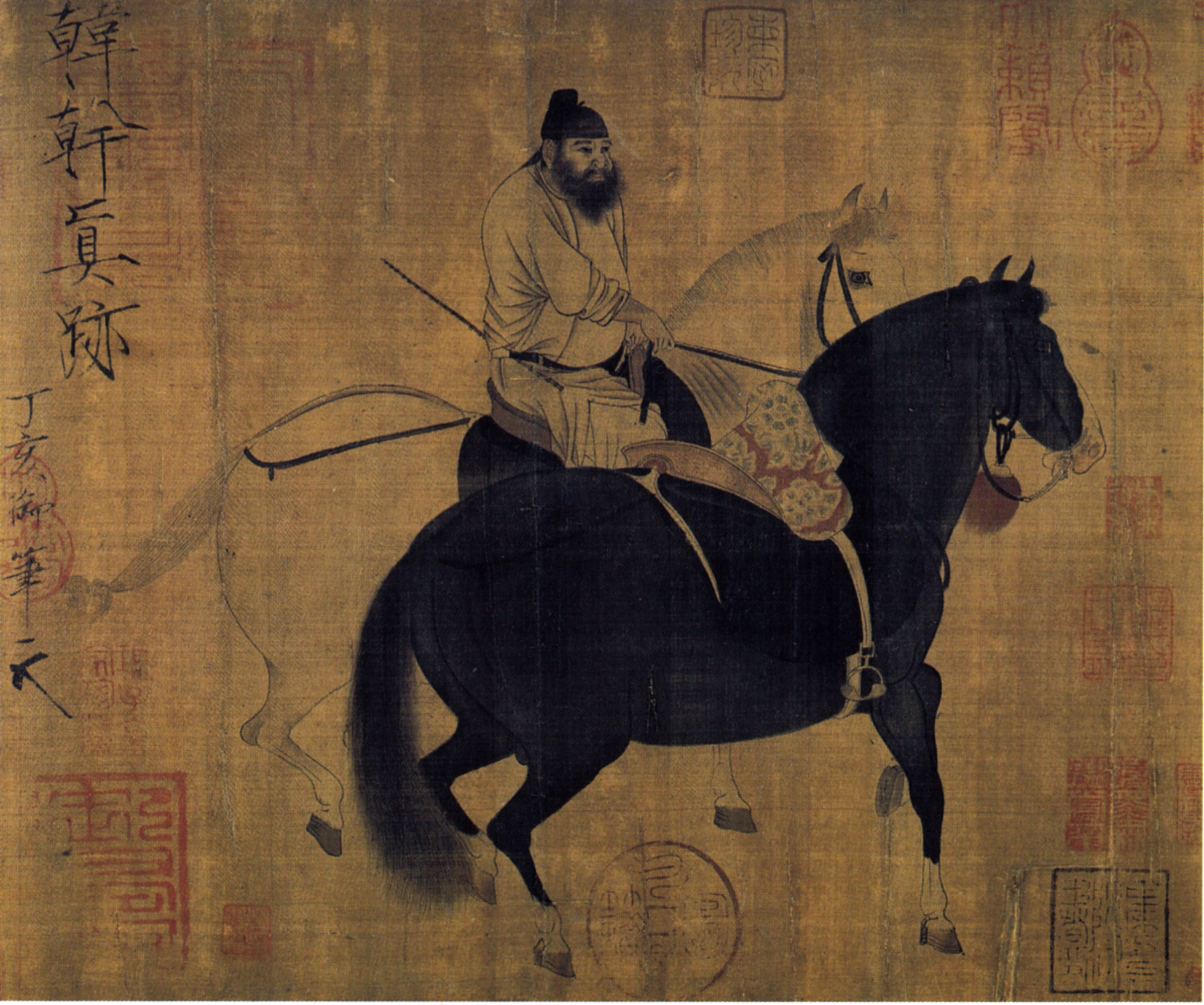
The Man Herding Horses, c. 12th century

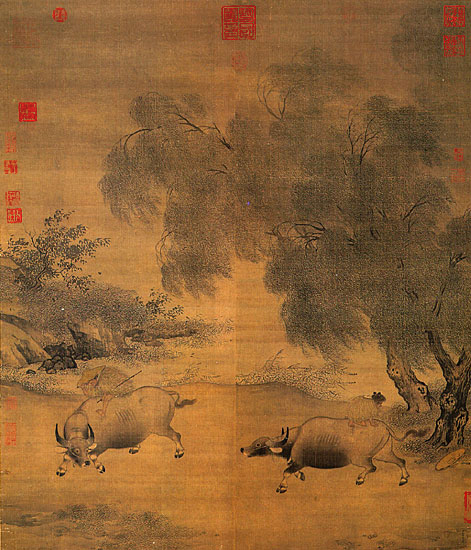
The Homeward Oxherds in Wind and Rain, by Li Di, 12th century

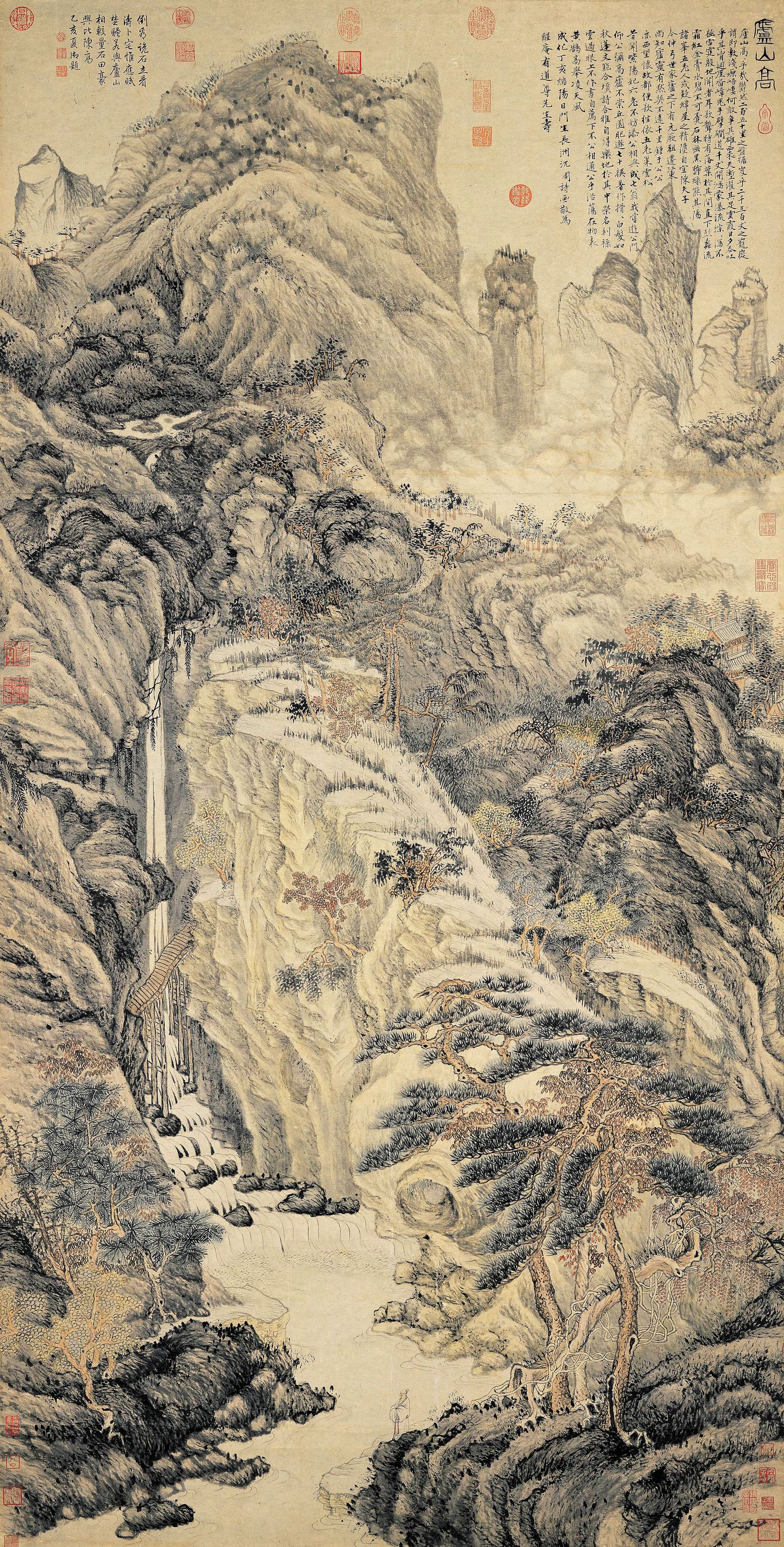
The Lofty Mt.Lu, by Shen Zhou, 1467

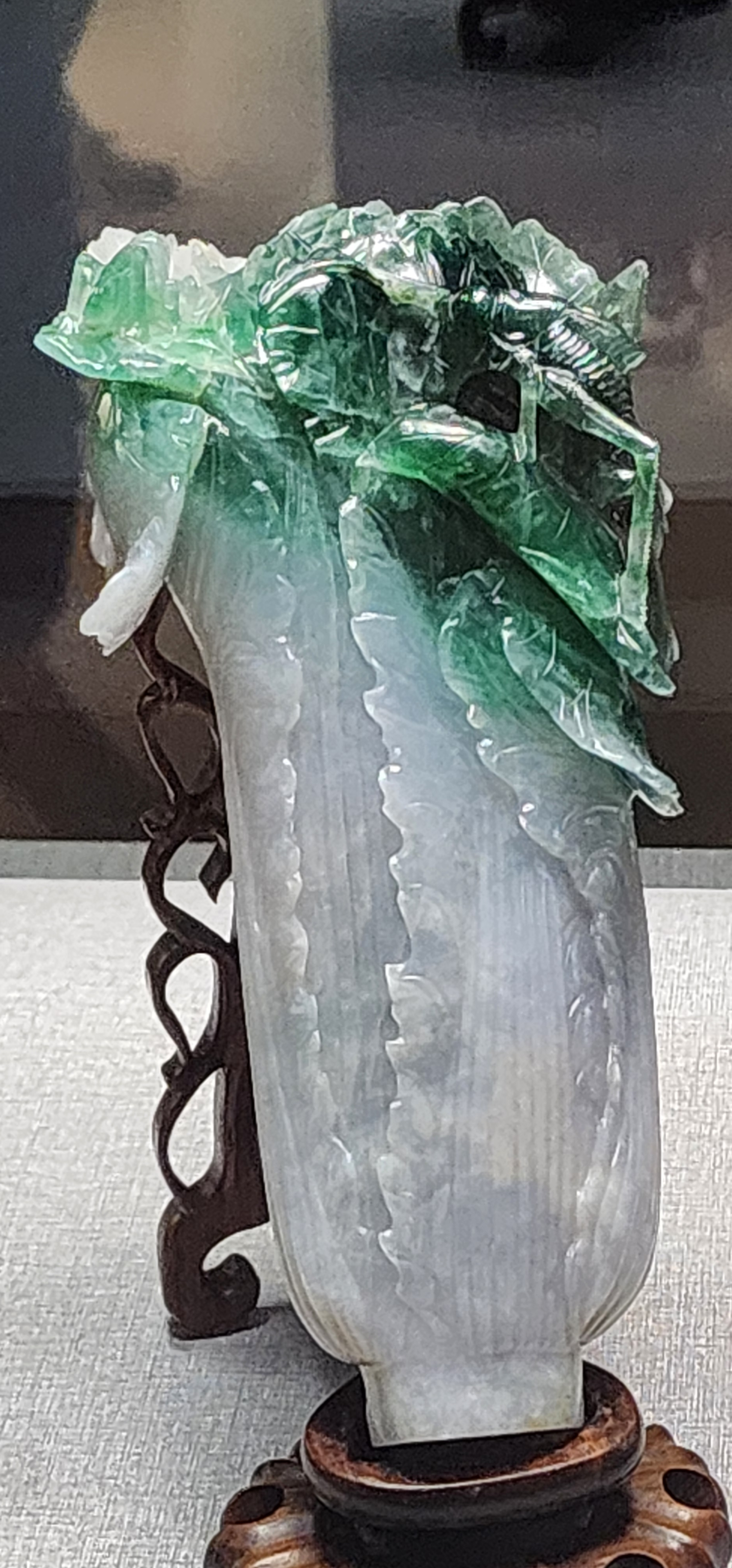
Jadeite cabbage, Qing dynasty.

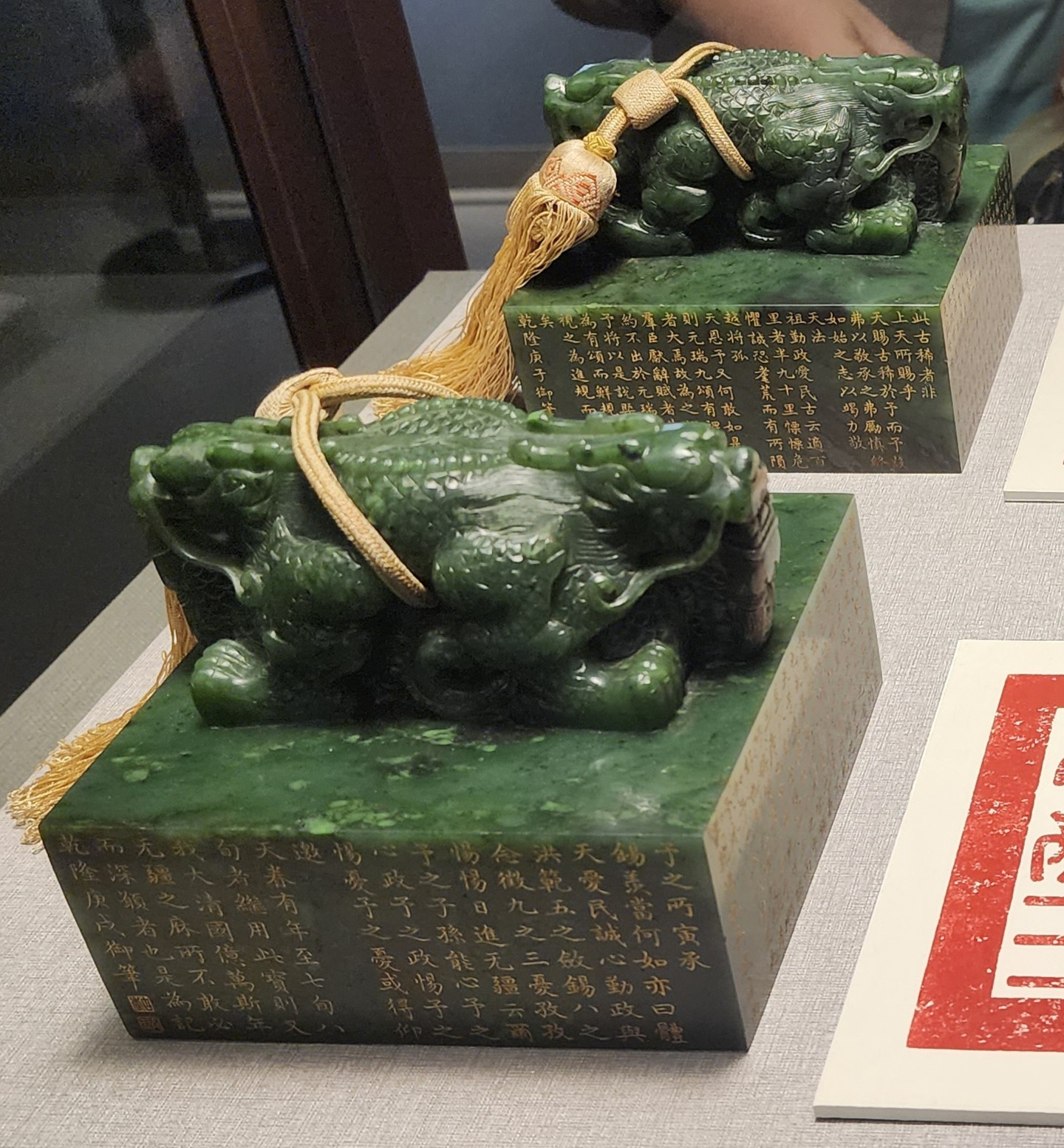
Jade seals of the Qianlong Emperor (1711–99)

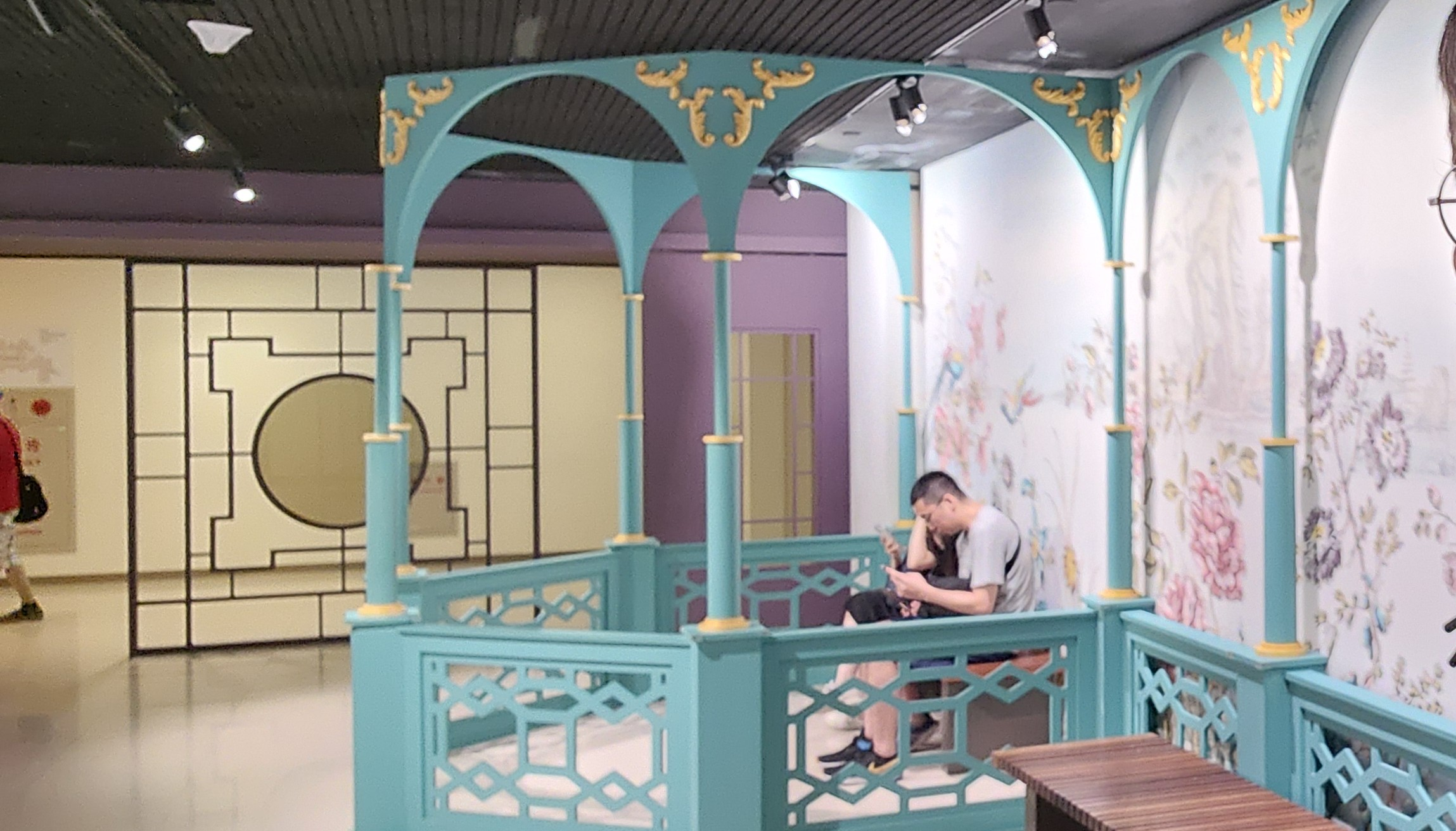
An oriental garden scene based on the Chinoiserie works of French Rococo artist Jean Pillement (1728–1808)
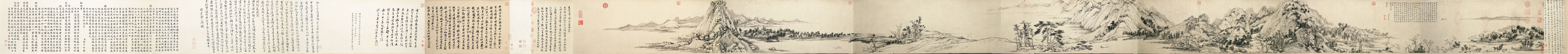
The Dwelling in the Fuchun Mountains, by Huang Gongwang, 1347–1350
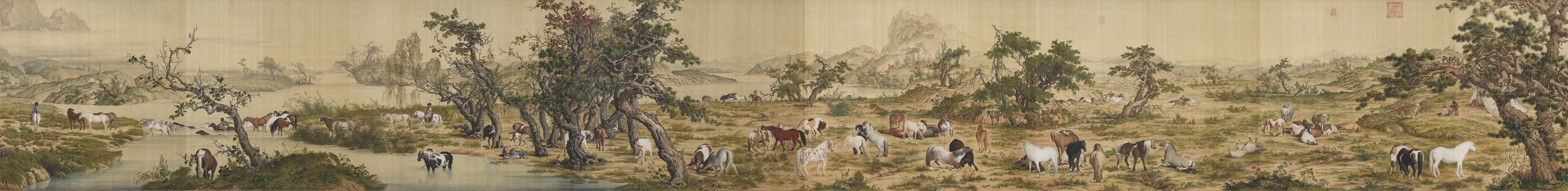
The One Hundred Horses: A painting done in 1728 by Giuseppe Castiglione by implementing a mixture of western artistic skills and utilizing eastern materials to realize a sense of realism to this native theme

== See also ==
- List of most visited art museums
- List of largest art museums
- List of museums in Taipei
- List of museums in Taiwan
- Tourism in Taiwan
