= L&L Hawaiian Barbecue =

Hawaii-themed franchise restaurant chain

L&L Franchise, Inc.

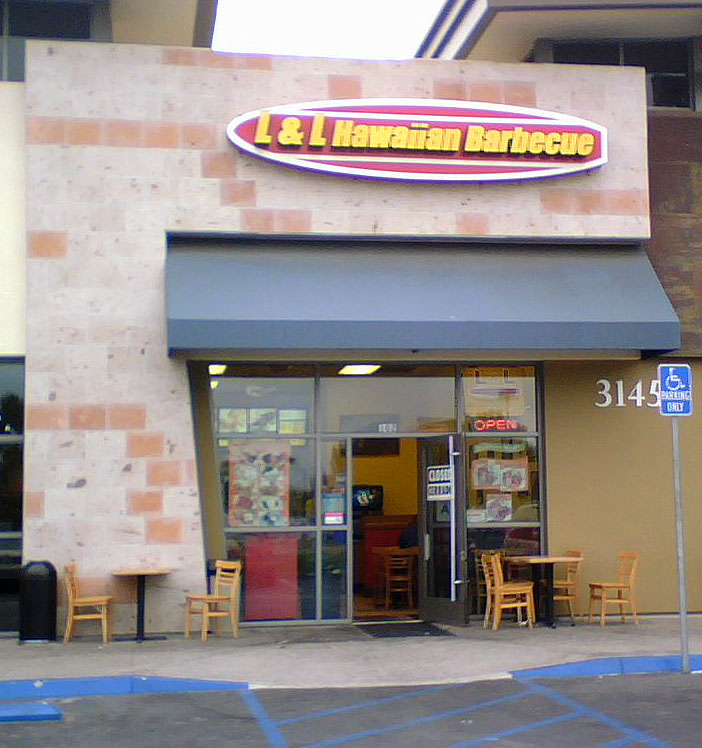
- L&L Hawaiian Barbecue in San Diego, California
- Trade name: L&L Drive-Inn; L&L Hawaiian Barbecue
- Type: Private
- Industry: Restaurants
- Genre: Made-to-order Quick Service Home Cooking
- Founded: 1952; 74 years ago in Honolulu, Hawaii
- Founder: Eddie Flores Jr.; Johnson Kam
- Headquarters: Honolulu, Hawaii
- Number of locations: 230 locations (2026)
- Area served: United States (20 states); Japan
- Key people: Eddie Flores Jr.; Johnson Kam
- Products: Hawaiian Plate Lunch, Spam Musubi, Loco Moco, Kalua Pork, Lau Lau, Teriyaki, Chicken Katsu, BBQ Chicken, Hawaiian Drinks
- Owner: Eddie Flores Jr.; Johnson Kam
- Website: www.hawaiianbarbecue.com

L&L Hawaiian Barbecue, known also as L&L Drive-Inn or colloquially as L&L, is the only Hawaii-origin, Hawaii-themed franchise restaurant franchise from Honolulu, Hawaii, centered on the plate lunch.

Eddie Flores Jr. and Johnson Kam purchased the original L&L Drive-Inn in 1976, later starting their expansion and introducing Hawaiian Plate Lunch, Spam Musubi, Loco Moco, Katsu Chicken and Korean Beef Short Ribs - Kalbi to Mainland markets in 1999. There are now more than 230 locations across the United States. Internationally, the company also has locations in Japan.

== History ==
In 1976, Eddie Flores Jr. bought L&L Drive-Inn at 1711 Liliha St., Oahu, Hawaii for his mother, Margaret Flores. He kept the name L&L, even while there was no relation to the current business, and remodeled the building as a small walk-up restaurant for his mother to operate. Johnson Kam joined Margaret as a partner. In 1977, Margaret sold all her shares to Johnson.

After this single restaurant became a success, it expanded into multiple locations across the island, Eddie Flores returned as a partner with Kam and helped him with the franchising of L&L in Hawaii in 1988. By 1997, there were 30 locations throughout the state.

=== Mainland expansion ===
==== Western United States ====
In early June 1999 Kam and Flores noticed that a former employee was doing fairly well selling Hawaiian-style plate lunches in the San Francisco Bay Area, in spite of their restaurant's less than ideal location. Since he realized that it was possible to sell this cuisine in California, Kam and Flores obtained a location in October of the same year inside the Puente Hills Mall in the City of Industry, California to open the first mainland L&L location. Due to differing expectations of the types of food usually served at drive-ins, Flores decided to change the name on the mainland to L&L Hawaiian Barbecue to strengthen the chain's association to Hawaiian cuisine.

There were 49 L&L locations in Hawaii when the first California L&L location opened in October 1999. After opening at the Puente Hills Mall, the chain opened other locations throughout Los Angeles County. In September 2000, L&L opened its first location in Orange County.

The first L&L in the Western United States outside of California was opened in Hillsboro, Oregon in August 2001. Soon after, a location opened in July 2002 in Henderson, Nevada. A number of other locations started opening up, including Lynnwood, Washington in March 2003, Mesa, Arizona in June 2004, Provo, Utah in August 2004, Aurora, Colorado in August 2004, and Anchorage, Alaska in November 2009.

==== Eastern United States ====
L&L opened its first location in this region in May 2003, located in Manchester, Connecticut. This location has since closed.

As for New York, the first L&L location was opened on Fulton Street in New York City in November 2004. The New York City location has since closed. L&L's only current New York location is near the Canadian border in Evans Mills, though three locations are planned to open in East Harlem, the Lower East Side and Bushwick.

In Florida, L&L opened in Jacksonville in April 2017.

==== Central United States ====
As of 2022, there are several locations in the Central region. The Plano, Texas, location opened in November 2008. Other Texas locations are in San Antonio, Houston, Katy and Waco. Previously operating locations included Champaign, Illinois, near the University of Illinois at Urbana–Champaign campus in October 2004, East Lansing. Michigan in June 2005, Lewisville, Texas, which opened in April 2008. and Franklin, Tennessee in June 2015.

==== American Pacific territories ====
The company previously had locations in the American territories in the Western Pacific. The first expansion westward of Hawaii occurred when L&L opened in American Samoa in June 2008, though the franchise closed sometime between September 2012 and March 2013.

A location in Guam was opened in October 2014, but later closed in January 2018.

==== International ====
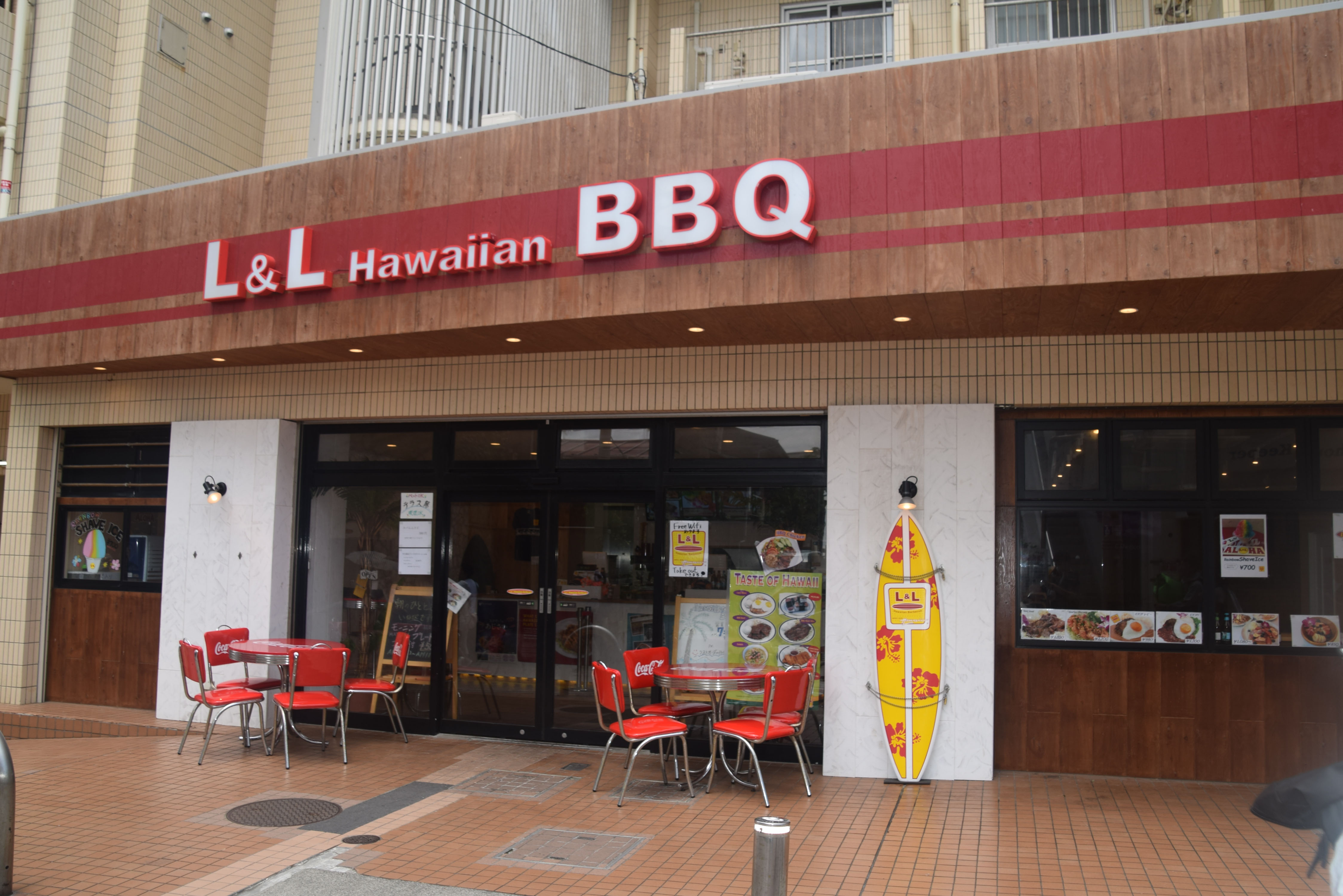
L&L Hawaiian Barbecue near Enoshima, Japan

L&L's first international location was opened in Auckland, New Zealand, in February 2009. In Japan, the first location was opened in the Shibuya section of Tokyo in June 2010, and a second location near Enoshima, Fujisawa, Kanagawa, in December 2017. In China, the first location was opened in June 2013.

The first L&L location in Malaysia was opened in Kuala Lumpur in December 2014. In 2015, the first L&L location in Indonesia was opened in Jakarta in June 2015, followed by the first L&L location in the Philippines, which opened in Manila in October 2015.

The company closed their sole Indonesian location in January 2017.

== Menu ==
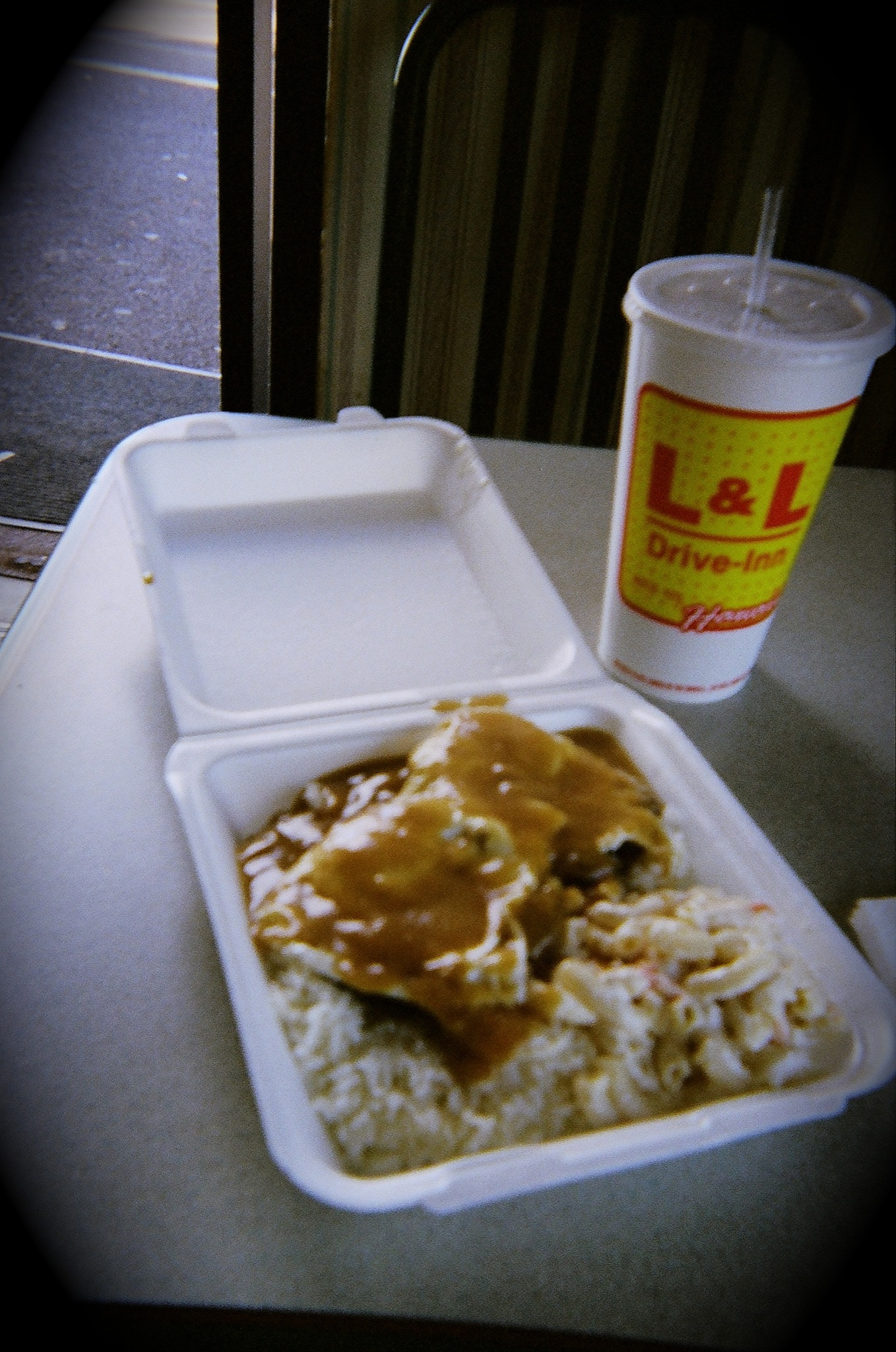
A Loco moco mix plate from L&L, with rice and macaroni salad

L&L Hawaiian Barbecue's menu is centered around the Hawaiian plate lunch – two scoops of rice, a scoop of macaroni salad, and a meat or seafood entrée. Many of the menu items include nods to Asian and Polynesian heritage, like chicken katsu and kalua pork. The menu also encompasses popular Hawaiian dishes, such as the Loco moco and saimin. The restaurant chain is also known for their spam musubi, introducing it as a part of their menu in 1999.

In 2021, L&L established August 8 as National SPAM Musubi Day to mark the growing popularity of the snack.

== Accolades and milestones ==
L&L Hawaiian Barbecue's success has earned the company many awards and continued rankings in various local and national magazines. In 2002, L&L Hawaiian Barbecue was named one of the “50 Regional Powerhouse Chains” by Nation's Restaurant News. The July 2005 issue of Restaurant & Institutions Magazine ranked L&L as the 314th out of America's top 400 restaurant chains. Additionally, Restaurant Business magazine ranked L&L as number 15 out of 50 for Top Growth Chains in the Nation in 2005. Entrepreneur magazine has also ranked L&L's parent company, L&L Franchise, Inc. at number 165 out of 500 for the top franchises in 2005.

In 2012, the company published a cookbook entitled, "$266 Million Winning Lottery Recipes: L&L Hawaiian Barbecue Cookbook" written by Eddie Flores Jr. and illustrated by Jon J. Murakami. The book features several of the L&L Hawaiian Barbecue recipes that made the restaurant famous.

== See also ==
- List of barbecue restaurants
- List of restaurants in Hawaii
- List of fast food restaurant chains
