= Saimin =

Hawaiian noodle dish

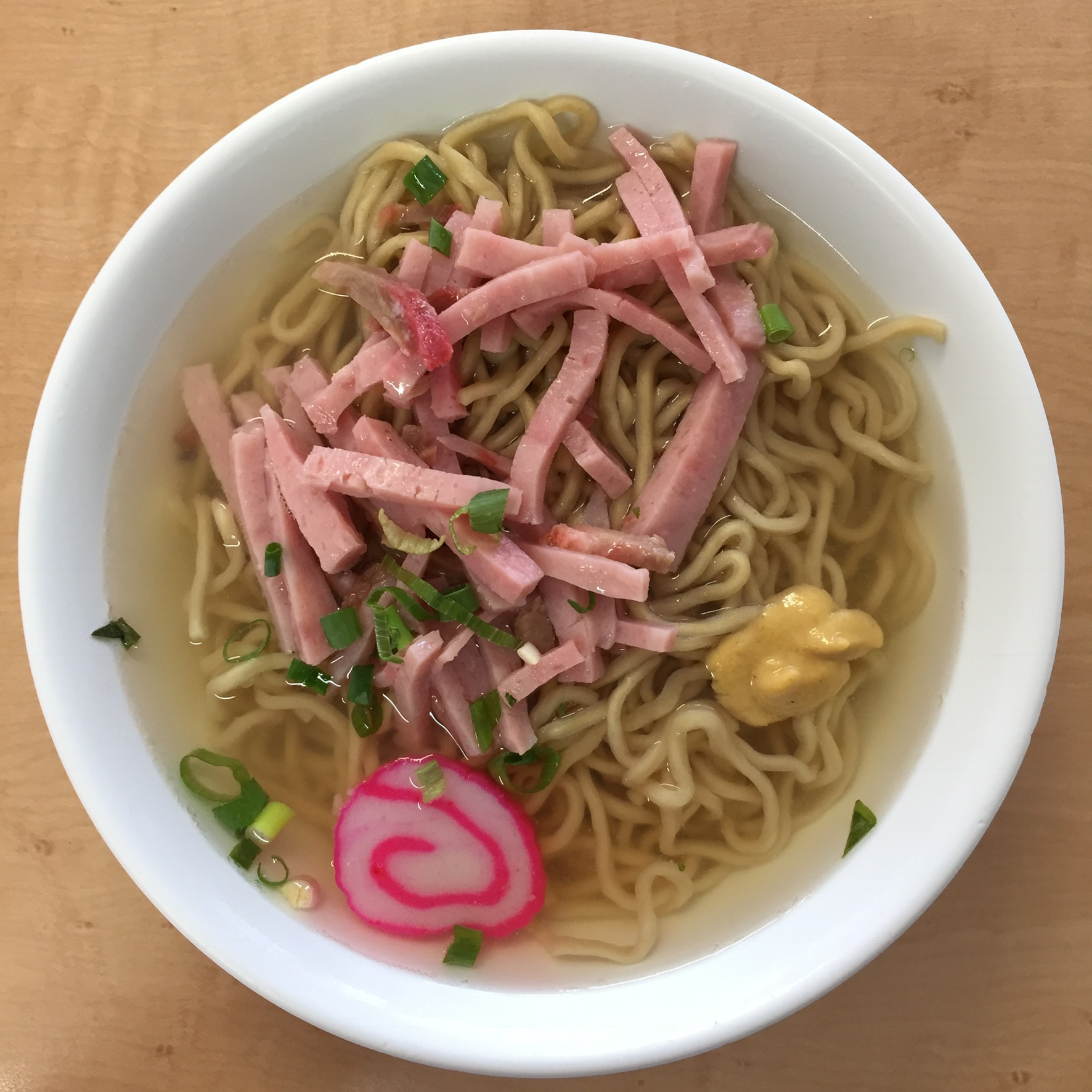
- Saimin is a noodle soup developed in Hawaii.
- Type: Noodle soup
- Place of origin: United States
- Region or state: Hawaii
- Serving temperature: Hot or warm (as "fried saimin")
- Main ingredients: Dashi, egg and wheat noodles, green onions, and kamaboko
- Variations: fried saimin, saidon

Saimin (from Cantonese Chinese: 細麵, sai³ min⁶, thin (wheat) noodles, or 細麵條湯 sai³ min⁶ tiu⁵ tong¹, vermicelli soup) is a noodle soup dish common in the contemporary cuisine of Hawaii. Traditionally consisting of soft wheat egg noodles served in a hot dashi garnished with diced green onions and a thin slice of kamaboko, modern versions of saimin include additional toppings such as char siu, sliced Spam, sliced egg, bok choy, mushrooms, or shredded nori. When wontons are added to the noodle soup, it is seen on menus as the heartier wonton min. All saimin establishments have their own, often secret recipe for the soup base, but primarily use kombu and dried shrimp as major ingredients. Common table condiments mixed in the saimin broth are Chinese hot mustard and soy sauce, added in small quantities according to each individual's taste. Many local residents of Hawaii also enjoy barbecued teriyaki beef sticks (skewers) or American hamburgers as a side dish.

Saimin was developed during Hawaii's plantation era and is a testament to the history of cultural influences found in the Hawaiian Islands. It is a local comfort food eaten all year round at any time of day for breakfast, lunch, dinner, or as a late-night snack. Initially consumed by the working class, saimin can now be seen on the menus of Hawaii's restaurants from fast food chains to upscale five-star hotel restaurants. It is commonly eaten at sporting events or available precooked packaged food much like instant ramen.

== History ==
=== Etymology ===
Saimin is a compound of two Chinese words: 細 (pinyin: xì; Jyutping: sai3), meaning small, and 麵 (pinyin: miàn; Jyutping: min6), meaning noodle. The word derives from Cantonese and is still used commonly in Cantonese today. The first recorded use of the romanized word in Hawaii dates as far back as 1908, but was most likely spoken in the local dialect much earlier. In Hawaii's contemporary pidgin language, saimin has become a hyponym or blanket term for noodle soups, particularly instant ramen (e.g., "And one day, I come home from school and Blu and Maisie are eating dry saimin sprinkled with the soup stock").

=== Origin ===
The precise origins of saimin as a dish is debatable. The clash of cultures in Hawaii makes it difficult to precisely pinpoint the exact beginning of saimin, but in turn makes this dish unique with roots set deeply in Hawaii's history. The earliest records of saimin identified the dish as being Chinese in origin. Many newspaper clippings of Hawaii's yesteryears mentioning saimin are also exclusively associated with the Chinese population and their neighborhoods. The majority of these associations are also subtly derogatory, suggesting a less desirable, low-class representation of their community. That being so, it may become a sensitive issue crediting Chinese immigrants with saimin's origins even with strong written evidence behind this theory.

It is certain that saimin, along with much of the contemporary cuisine in Hawaii, is closely related to the immigration of Chinese, Japanese, Korean, Filipino, and Portuguese field workers during the plantation era of Hawaii beginning in the 1850s. As the popular belief goes, these plantation laborers of various ethnic backgrounds would return from the fields and share communal meals. For example, a Korean family may have had extra green onions growing in their yard, the Portuguese would have some extra pork from making sausage, the Chinese would share some noodles, while the Japanese provide some dashi for the meal. At this point, they would all throw their ingredients into a pot and share what was created. It may be through these improvised communal meals that saimin was possibly born. This common, yet supposed history of saimin's origins is highly debatable, since there are recorded accounts of much racial tension between the various ethnic groups during this time. Interracial activity was highly limited and the groups were more than often segregated, leaving little chance for these imagined communal meals.

Among the immigrant population in Hawaii, one of the largest (besides the Chinese) and most influential (besides the Caucasian) immigrants were the Japanese and it is theorized that saimin was created by this ethnic group wanting to eat ramen. Instead of a full replication, they were limited to the ingredients readily available to them in Hawaii, resulting in the creation of saimin. There are records of Japanese immigrants peddling saimin in Hawaii as early as 1915, giving them a decent standing as its fore-bearer. However, the Japanese ramen theory also has many complications and anachronisms. During the same time period, ramen was not the widely popular phenomenon in Japan as it is known today and would not be considered a food Japanese immigrants immediately associate with their homeland. To drive this point further, if indeed Japanese immigrants were attempting to recreate ramen in Hawaii, the common Japanese language did not use the word ramen (ラーメン) until about the 1950s. In Japan it was first known as shina soba (支那そば, lit. 'Chinese soba'), as the ramen itself was a dish with Chinese origins. Saimin noodles themselves are closer in characteristic to the curly yellow-colored Chinese egg noodles found in wonton noodles as opposed to the straight white wheat noodles consumed in Japan, giving Chinese immigrants an edge as the first developers of saimin.

=== Initial appearance ===
Saimin was first sold as a menu item in the early 1900s from unmarked and unnamed 'saimin wagons' as "an immigrant family's first step into American entrepreneurship". The noodles, broth, and toppings were made from scratch and prepared by hand in their homes. With all the components ready to assemble and serve, they would wheel out to a spot wherever there were plantation laborers looking for a cheap and quick bite to eat. As these families earned more money, they were able to set up shop at fixed locations. The first of these saimin stands could be found near the old plantation towns and farms of Hawaii as early as the 1930s, feeding hungry fieldworkers for as little as $0.05 a bowl.

=== Post-plantation popularization ===
As Hawaii gradually moved from an agricultural economy towards a more service-based economy in the 1960s and 1970s, saimin stands moved away from the plantation fields with many more establishments opening near sporting venues, movie theaters, pool halls, and schools. Due to its timely preparation and warm broth, it became popular as a quick late night snack for young adults after a night out on the town. Also at this time several public schools throughout Hawaii began offering saimin as a regular option for students who did not want to eat the scheduled weekly menu.

It was not until the opening of Honolulu Stadium and its addition to the concession stand's menu when saimin became acknowledged as a popular fast food and put under a national spotlight. Chuck Tanner, retired Major League Baseball player for the Boston Braves and former manager of minor league baseball team the Hawaii Islanders in 1969 and 1970, recalled, "During the games, fans ate corn on the cob. They had some soup. . . won ton or something. I don't know. And they had these sticks with beef on them."

=== Modern period ===
Saimin became less popular in the 1980s and 1990s as the appearance of other exciting noodle soup dishes made their way to Hawaii such as tonkotsu ramen and pho. As other forms of noodle soup grew in popularity, many saimin institutions closed, leaving saimin as a comfort food of nostalgic value to the older generation in Hawaii.

=== Historic saimin establishments ===
Several saimin establishments including saimin noodle factories and restaurants have become local landmarks in Hawaii and have attracted out-of-state visitors venturing off the traditional tourist-beaten paths. There are many that have closed their doors, such as Shiroma's Saimin in Waipahu, Washington Saimin in Makiki, Hall Saimin in Kalihi, Likelike Drive In, and most recently Dillingham Saimin (formally known as Boulevard Saimin). Some local institutions still in existence with decades under their belts are Jane's Fountain, The Old Saimin House, Palace Saimin, Meg's Drive In, Shiro's Saimin Haven, Forty-Niner Restaurant, and Sekiya's Restaurant & Delicatessen on Oahu. Also notable are Nori's Saimin & Snacks on the Big Island, Sam Sato's on Maui, and Hamura's Saimin on Kauai, which was given the James Beard Foundation's America's Classic honor in 2006.

== McDonald's saimin ==
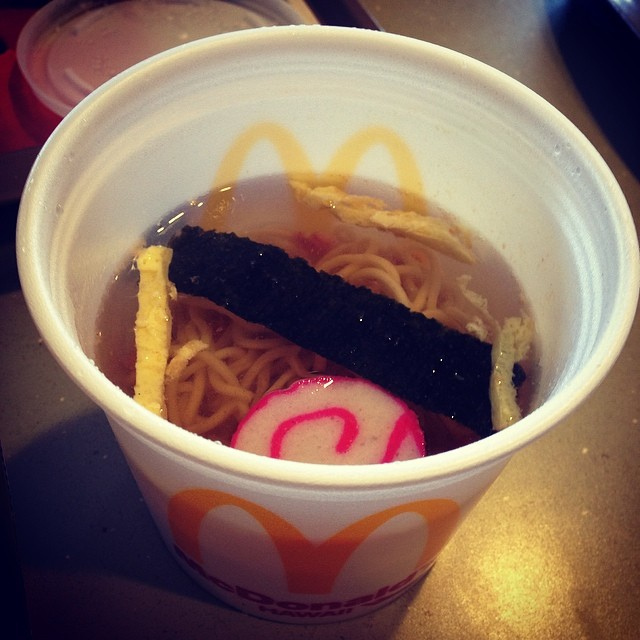
A serving of McDonald's saimin.

McDonald's, an American fast-food giant based in Oak Brook, Illinois, became aware of the saimin phenomenon in the Hawaiian islands in the late 1960s. Maurice J. "Sully" Sullivan, a Hawaii entrepreneur and owner of Foodland Super Market Limited, had purchased and opened the first McDonald's restaurant in Hawaii in 1968 at his flagship grocery store. He opened several more McDonald's franchises, and for 12 straight months, McDonald's Hawaii became the highest-grossing group of franchises in the world. Sullivan wanted to serve his favorite meal, saimin, at his McDonald's restaurants, knowing all too well that his restaurants would boom with its introduction to the menu.

Sullivan invited executives from the McDonald's corporation, including owner and business tycoon Ray Kroc for dinner at two family-owned, "hole-in-the-wall" saimin stands in Honolulu: Washington Saimin and Boulevard Saimin. That night, Sullivan convinced Kroc to expand McDonald's menu for the first time in its corporate history to include a local "ethnic" food. Researchers worked extensively with Washington Saimin to develop a recipe for McDonald's Hawaii. Sullivan secured deals with Ajinomoto, a local Japanese saimin noodle factory and fishcake supplier, to manufacture a special soup base.

Saimin was one of McDonald's Hawaii's most popular menu items. Later, Sullivan introduced breakfast platters consisting of Portuguese sausage, eggs, and steamed white rice; Spam, eggs, and rice; and a Breakfast deluxe, a combination of the two, to his menu, capitalizing on the local food phenomena.

On June 29, 2022, McDonald's Hawaii announced that it would no longer offer saimin on its menu. The item was discontinued because Okahara Saimin, the chain's supplier, had closed due to its owners' retirement at the end of May.

== S&S saimin ==
Much like its close counterpart ramen, saimin was also developed as an instant noodle in 1963 by Shimoko & Sons saimin brand, better known to locals as S&S saimin. Unlike instant ramen, S&S saimin noodles require refrigeration or freezing and are not dry. The noodles are also pre-cooked, making it a ready-to-eat food by simply adding hot water with a soup base packaged separately. Instant saimin has since become a staple in many Hawaii households because of its quick and easy preparation, in addition allowing the consumer to add any toppings they desire.

S&S is a large contributor to popularizing saimin since the name brand sponsored many local television shows between the late 1960s and early 1980s. During this time, S&S sent 20 children to Disneyland through a contest held with the beloved children's program, The Checkers and Pogo Show. The saimin brand also sponsored the "S&S Junk Show", a karaoke-based amateur singing program which ran for 15 seasons.

The S&S saimin brand was acquired by the Japanese multinational drink company Ito En in 1987. The brand was later sold to Hawaii-based noodle and pasta manufacturer Sun Noodle in 2006.

== Variations ==
Some saimin establishments may have the option to substitute the traditional thin egg noodles for the thicker udon noodle, or sometimes mixing both, creating something seen on local menus as saidon. A soup-less pan-fried version similar to Japanese yakisoba and Chinese lo mein is simply known as fried saimin. This variation is particularly popular at carnivals, fairgrounds, and catered parties since it can be prepared in large quantities and consumed at room temperature. Fried saimin is also served as a side dish in okazuya bento and plate lunch.

== See also ==
- Cuisine of Hawaii
- Plate lunch
- Loco moco
- Spam musubi
- Malasada
- Manapua
- Green River (soft drink)
