= Meat jun =

Korean-Hawaiian fusion dish

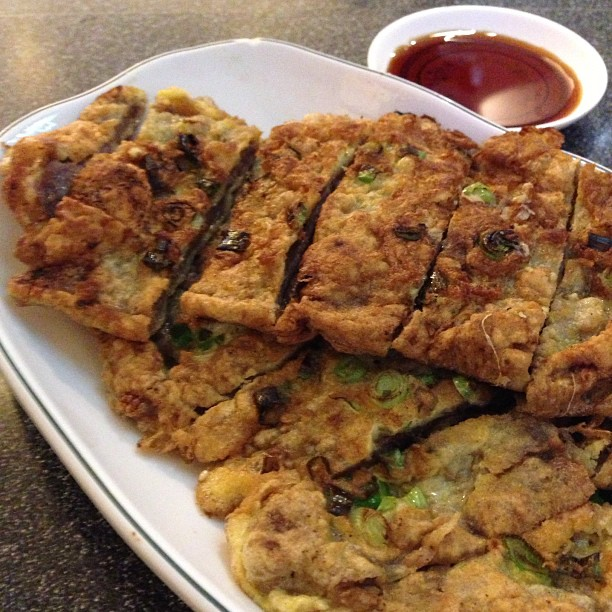
- Meat jun
- Type: Jeon, fritter
- Course: Entree
- Place of origin: Korea
- Associated cuisine: Korean cuisine
- Main ingredients: Beef
- Similar dishes: Jeon

Meat jun is a Korean fusion dish consumed in Hawaii, United States. It is also called "beef jun" outside of Hawaii. The dish is a variant of jeon (Korean pan-fried dishes) and descends from sogogi-jeon (소고기전). It consists of thinly sliced marinated beef dipped in an egg batter that is then pan-fried, or deep-fried, and typically served with rice, macaroni salad and banchan, like how many other plate lunches in Hawaii are served. Unlike typical beef jeon, in meat jun the beef is marinated. Meat jun is served as an everyday dish.

== Ingredients ==
Meat jun is a simple dish composed of marinated meat, eggs, and flour. While jeon can be made with many other ingredients, this Hawaiian take on soegogi-jeon is typically made with thinly sliced beef that is marinated in a sweet soy sauce (shoyu) and will usually come with a simple dipping sauce that is either soy- or gochujang- based which is mixed with rice wine vinegar, sesame oil and red pepper flakes or chili oil, which is typically optional.

== See also ==
- List of beef dishes
