= Pasta salad =

Summer salad made with pasta

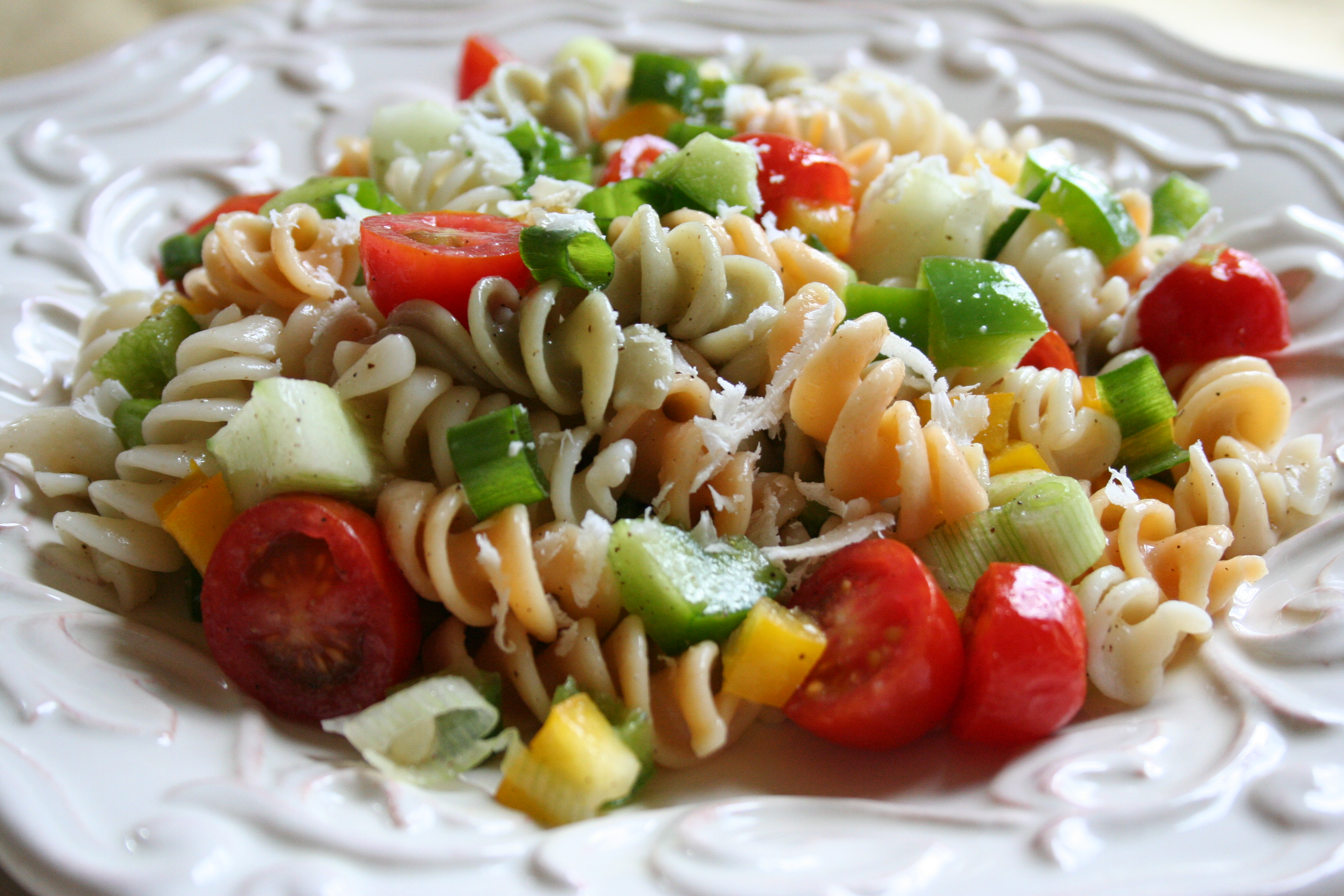
- Pasta salad with fusilli, tomato, and vegetables
- Alternative names: Insalata di pasta (in Italian), pasta fredda (in Italian)
- Type: Pasta
- Course: Antipasto or primo
- Place of origin: Italy
- Serving temperature: Cold
- Main ingredients: Pasta, vinegar or oil or mayonnaise

Pasta salad, known in Italian as insalata di pasta or pasta fredda, is a dish prepared with one or more types of pasta, almost always chilled or room temperature, and most often tossed in a vinegar, oil or mayonnaise-based dressing. It is typically served as an appetiser (antipasto) or first course (primo).

== Origin ==
Pasta salad appears in several food traditions. Italy mostly. Claudia Roden believes cold pasta dishes prepared by Jewish communities for the Sabbath. American versions grew in the mid twentieth century through Italian immigrant cooking. Cold macaroni salads appeared in early twentieth century American cookbooks. Recipes identified as pasta salad appeared in print by the early 1960s. Italian antipasto traditions and Sicilian pasta fredda also shaped the idea of a chilled pasta dish.

== Ingredients ==
Pasta salad uses short types of pasta such as rotini, farfalle, penne, or macaroni. Recipes often include vegetables, cheeses, or herbs. Dressings use vinaigrette or mayonnaise in different regions. The dish is usually served cold or at room temperature.

== Gallery ==
Pasta salads

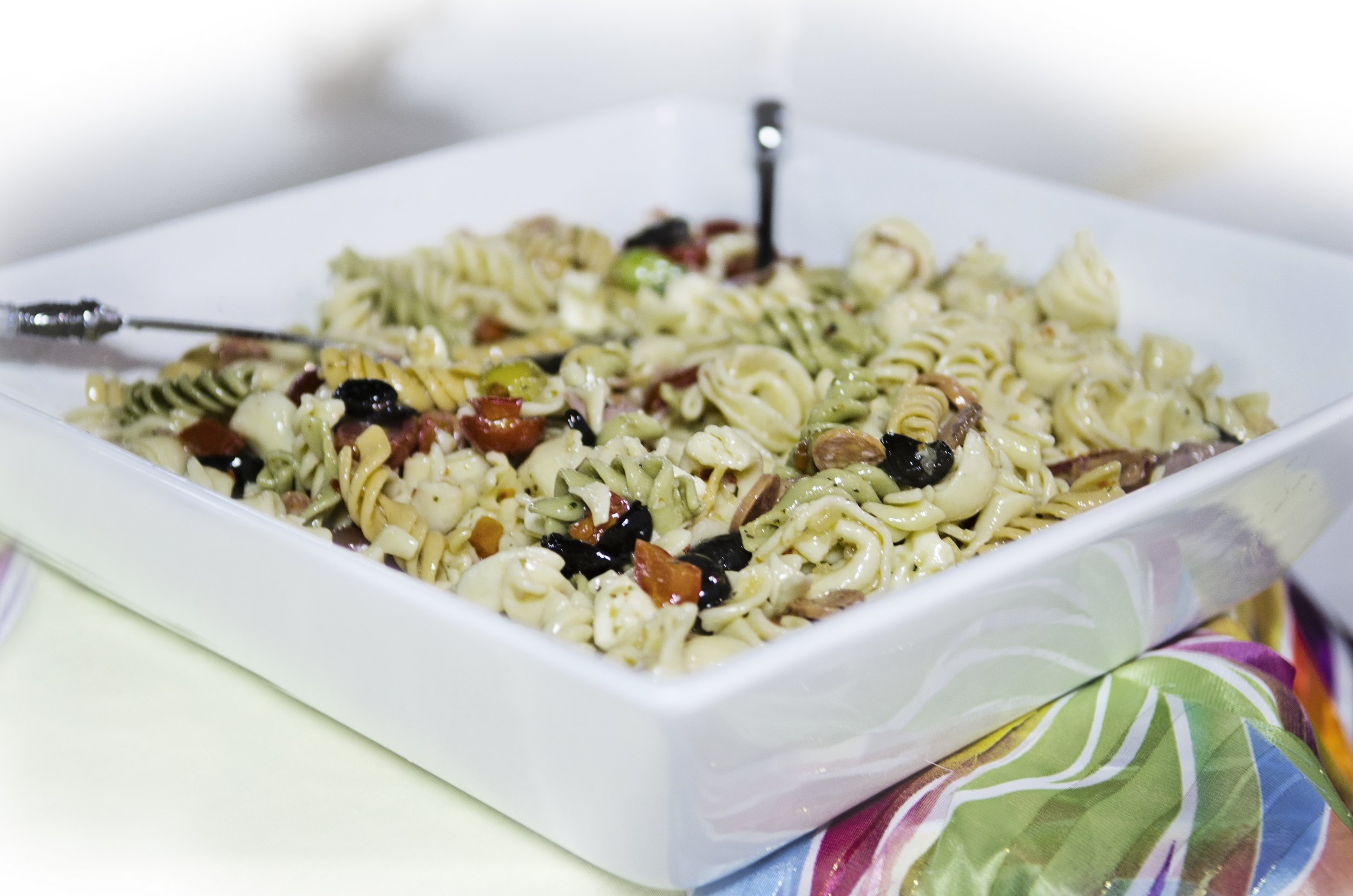
Pasta salad prepared with fusilli

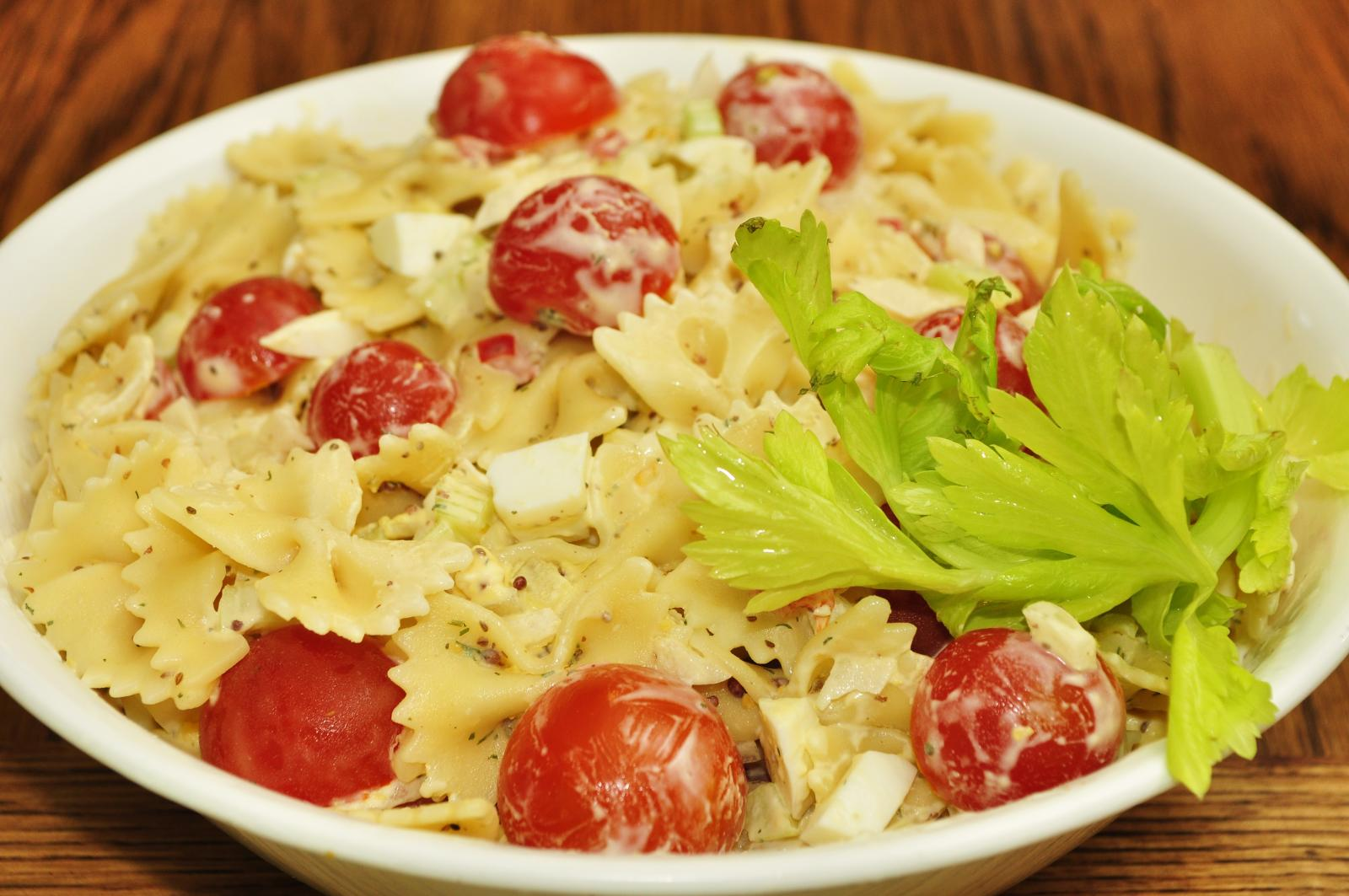
Pasta salad with cherry tomatoes

== See also ==
- Fusilli
