= Yoshida Foods International =

American food company

- Industry: Sauces, food products
- Founded: 1982
- Headquarters: Portland, Oregon, United States
- Owner: Junki Yoshida
- Website: yoshidafoods.com

Yoshida Foods International is a food company that specializes in their teriyaki-based cooking sauce. They were founded by Junki Yoshida, who calls himself Mr. Yoshida as a mascot of the brand. They are based in Oregon.

== History ==
The company had its early foundings in 1968 when Junki Yoshida, a Japanese immigrant, moved to the United States at age 19, and he founded a martial arts school with his wife Linda. They personally made their sauce in 1982. They gave it out for free before using Costco to launch the brand commercially.

They briefly sold the company to Kraft Heinz in 2000, but the rights were purchased back to the founders in 2024 due to financial loss from when it was under Heinz. They released an ice cream flavor in 2024.

Their distribution centers are at Portland International Airport.
