= Loco moco =

Dish in Hawaiian cuisine

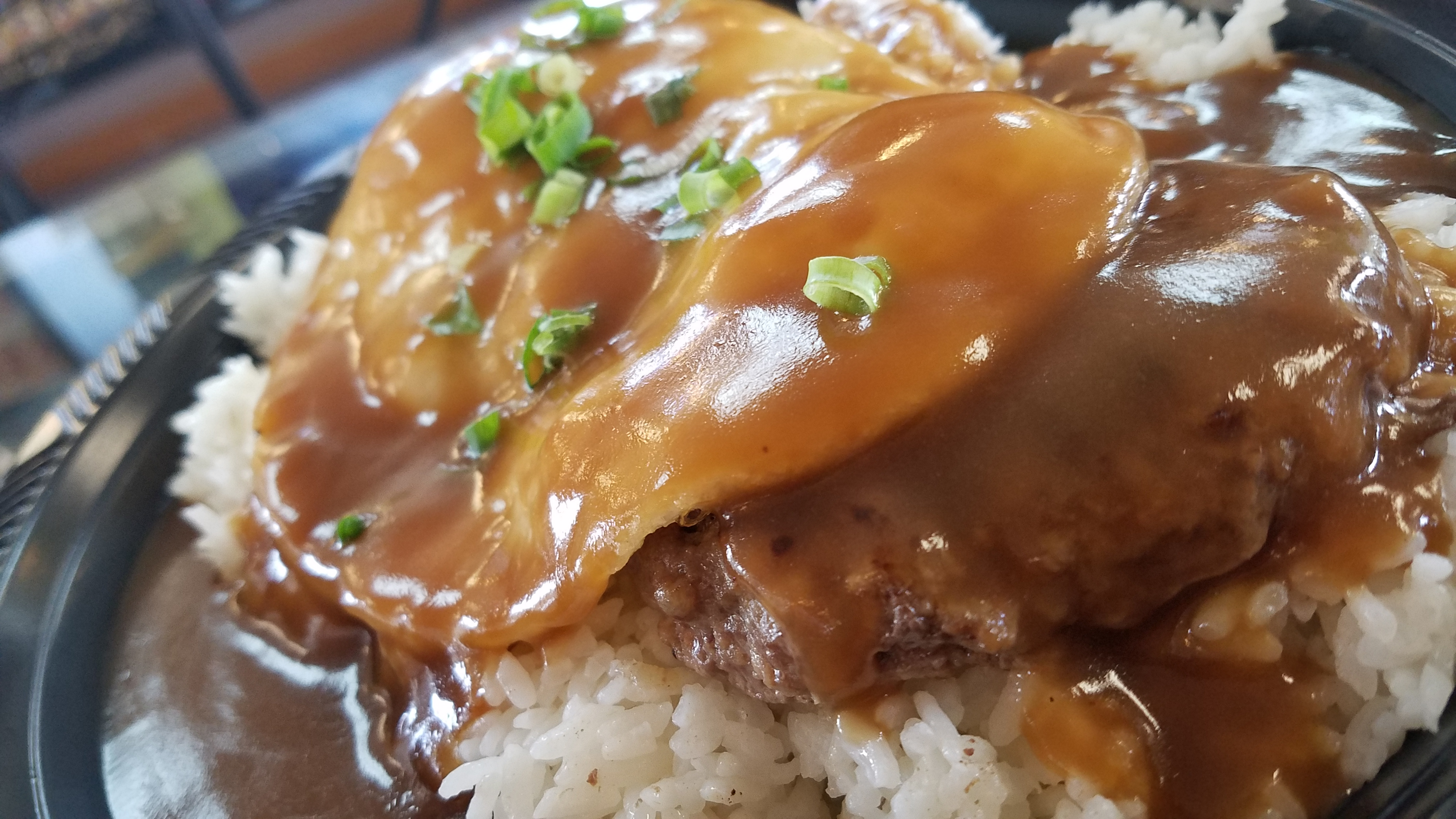
- Gravy over fried egg, hamburger, and rice.
- Type: Entree
- Course: Main course
- Place of origin: United States
- Region or state: Hawaii
- Associated cuisine: Hawaiian cuisine
- Created by: Nancy Inouye, Richard Inouye
- Serving temperature: Hot
- Main ingredients: white rice, topped with a hamburger steak, a fried sunny-side-up egg, and brown gravy
- Ingredients generally used: rice, macaroni salad, grilled onions, pickled vegetables
- Variations: burger loco, Spam loco, kalua loco, fish loco, tofu loco
- Food energy (per serving): average 950 kcal (approximate per standard serving), likely between 800 and 1,200 calories.

Loco moco is a dish featured in contemporary Hawaiian cuisine. Traditionally, loco moco consists of white rice, topped with a hamburger patty and brown gravy, and a sunny-side-up fried egg. Modern (non-traditional) presentations of the dish may include other toppings and side dishes such as grilled onions, pickled vegetables, macaroni, or potato salad.

== History and origin ==
The dish was reportedly created at the Lincoln Grill restaurant in Hilo, Hawaiʻi, in 1949 by its proprietors, Richard and Nancy Inouye. There are two different versions of the origin story. The first is that the dish was made to cater to teenagers from the Lincoln Wreckers Sports club who wanted a dish that was inexpensive, different from a sandwich, and quick to prepare and serve.

The second version of the story is that a group of teenagers asked Nancy to serve some rice in a bowl, a hamburger patty over the rice, and then top it with brown gravy.

The teenagers named the dish "Loco Moco" after one of their members, George Okimoto, whose nickname was "Crazy" because of his crazy antics. George Takahashi, who was studying Spanish at Hilo High School, suggested "loco" (Spanish, "crazy") and they tacked onto it "moco" which "rhymed with loco and sounded good".

In 1983, it sold for around $1 to $1.75. In 2015, a loco moco special was priced at around $16.

== Popularity ==
This dish was featured on the "Taste of Hawaiʻi" episode of Girl Meets Hawaiʻi, a Travel Channel show hosted by Samantha Brown. The episode features the dish being served at the Hawaiian Style Cafe in Waimea together with the plate lunch, another Hawaiian specialty dish.

The loco moco was also featured on a Honolulu-based episode of the Travel Channel show Man v. Food (this episode aired in the show's second season). The host, Adam Richman, tried the dish at the Hukilau Café, located in nearby Laie. Richman also tried an off-the-menu loco moco at a San Francisco eatery called Namu Gaji on his 2014 show, Man Finds Food. In 2018, on a different episode of the revived Man v. Food, host Casey Webb tried a loaded version of the loco moco at Da Kitchen in Maui.

Protein variations may include bacon, ham, Spam, tofu, kalua pork, Portuguese sausage, teriyaki beef, teriyaki chicken, mahi-mahi, shrimp, oysters, and other meats. However, the traditional name designation of loco moco applies to hamburger patties only. When the protein changes, the name is also changed, as in "Spam loco" or "kalua loco", for example.

== Gallery ==
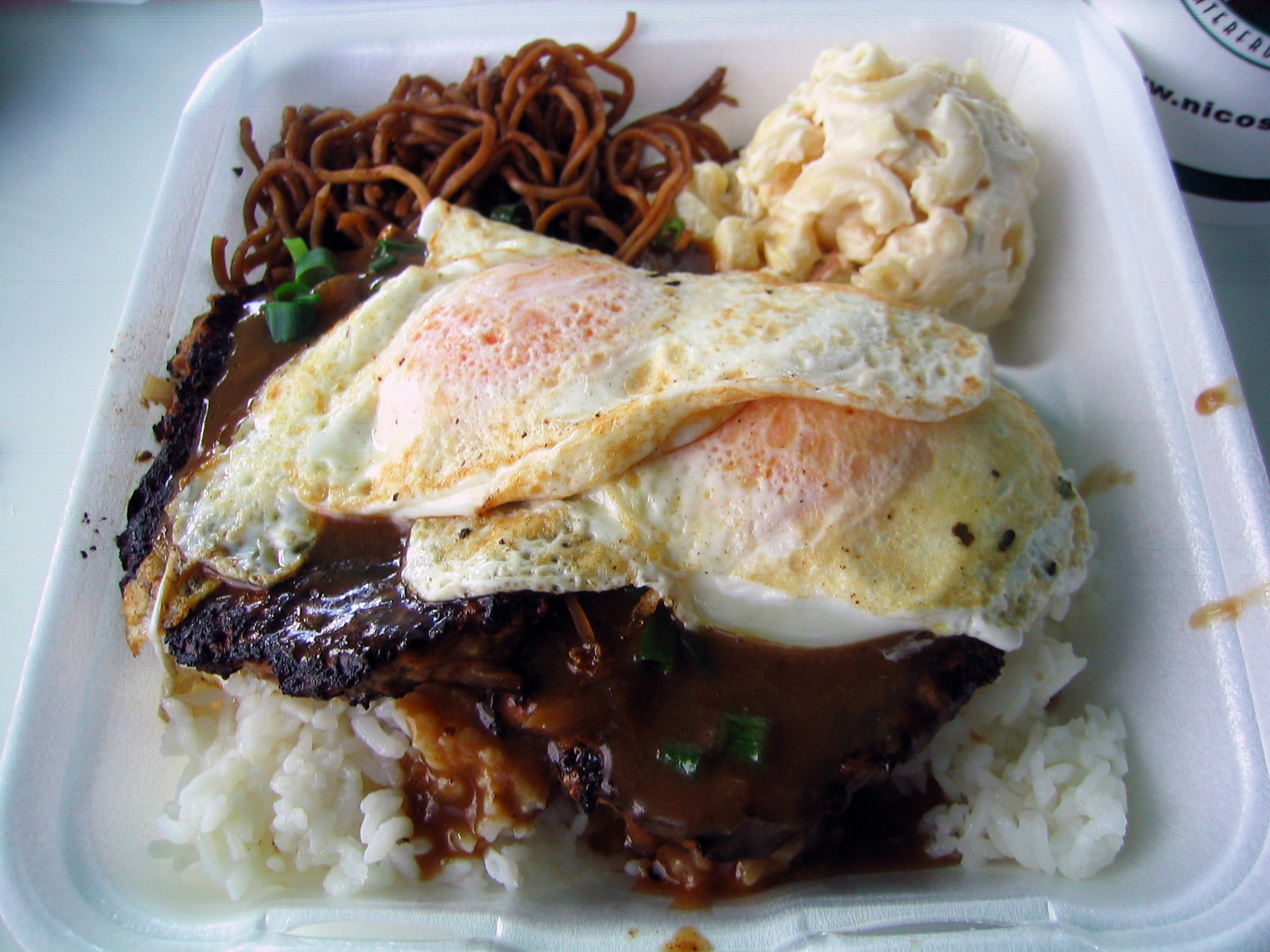
A loco moco plate lunch, with yakisoba (left) and macaroni salad (right).

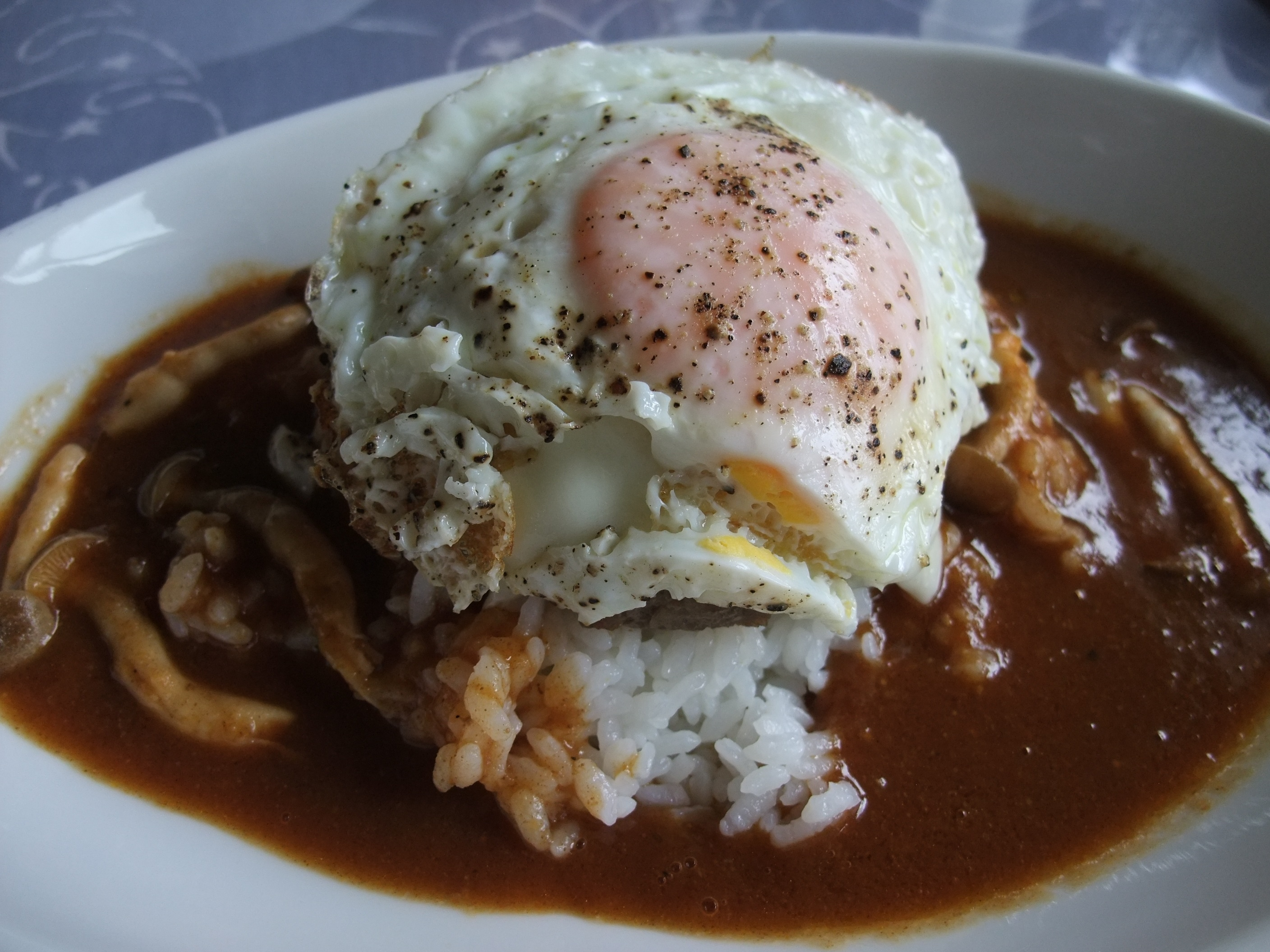
A traditional loco moco.

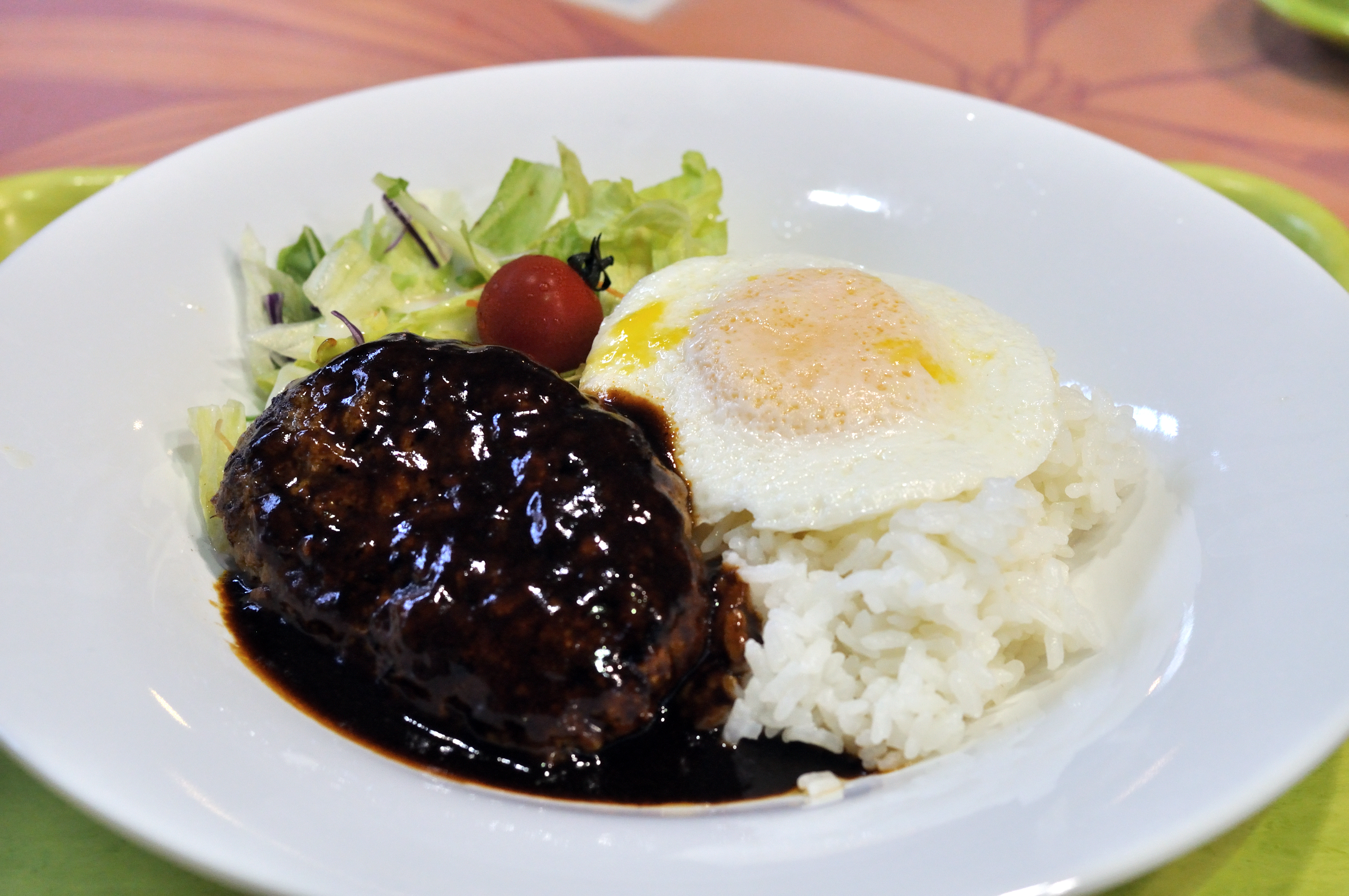
Loco moco served with a side of salad.

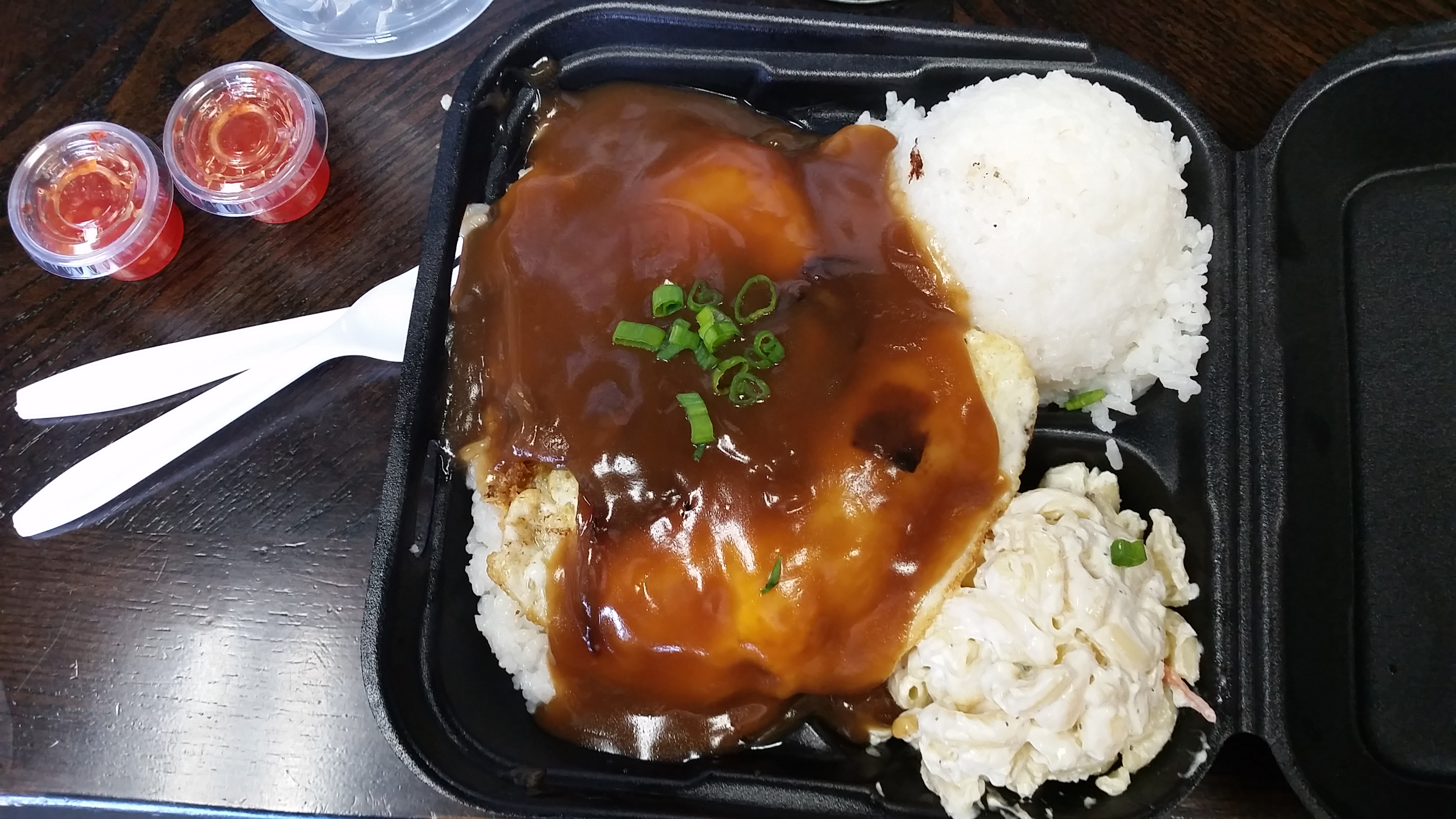
A plate lunch with an order of homestyle Hawaiian loco moco with the scoops of rice and macaroni salad clearly visible.

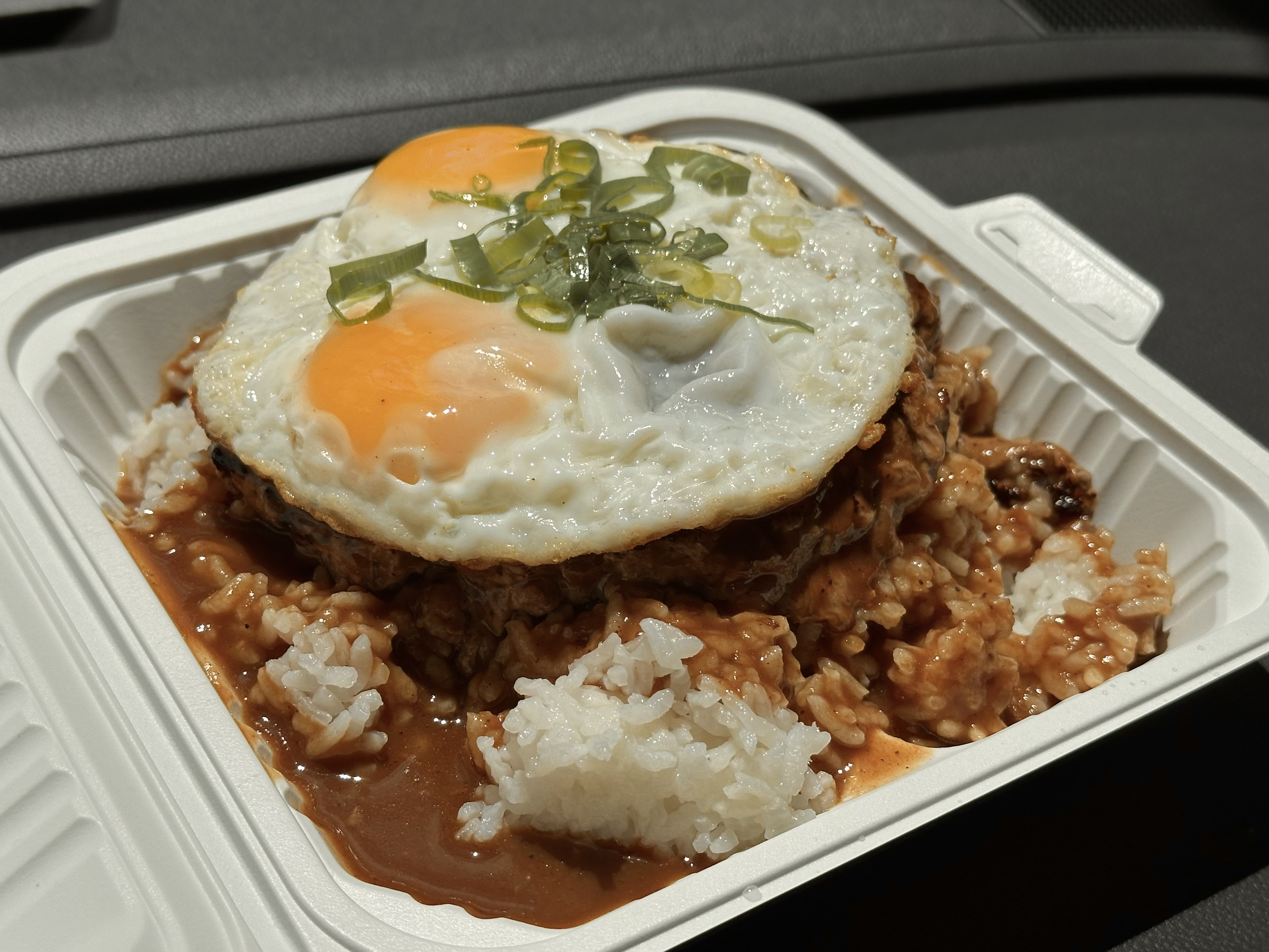
Loco moco served over white rice with a heavy layer of brown gravy from Ethel's Grill in Honolulu.

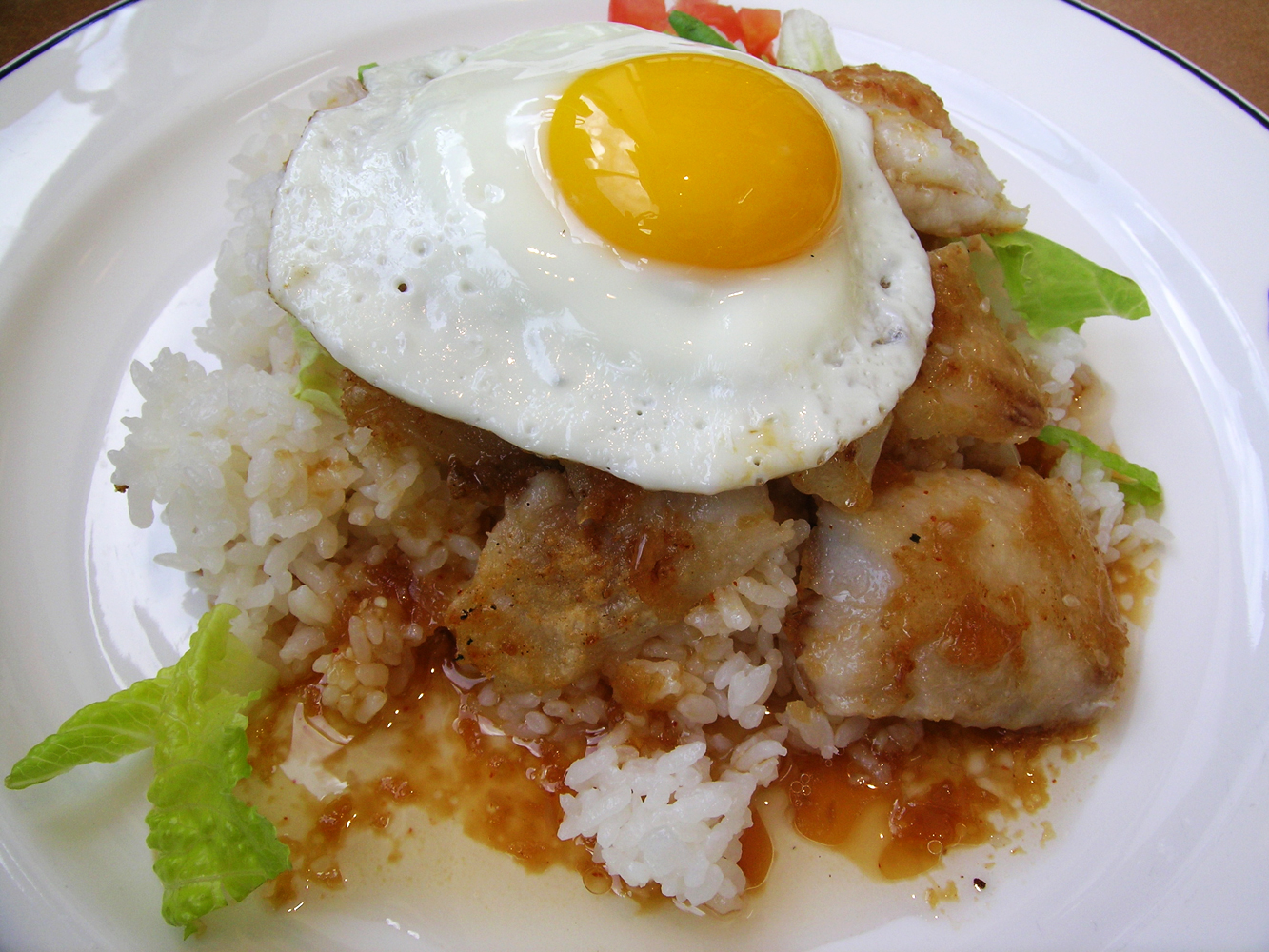
A modern variation featuring fried fish instead of a hamburger patty (fish loco).

== See also ==
- Donburi
- Garbage Plate
- Hamburg steak
- List of Hawaiian dishes
- List of regional dishes of the United States
- Silog
