= Plate lunch =

Quintessentially Hawaiian meal

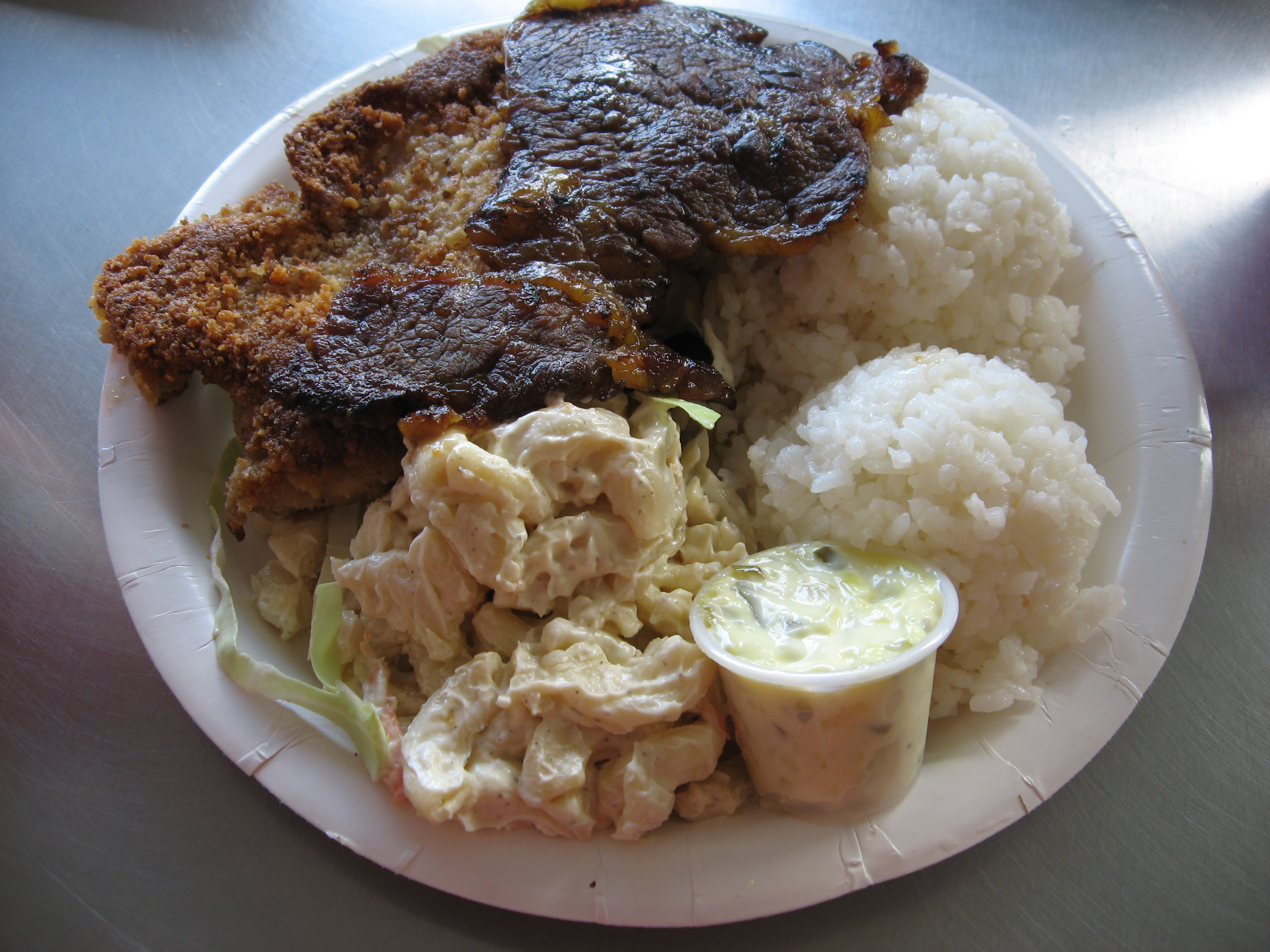
Mixed plate lunch served at the Rainbow Drive-In in Honolulu

The plate lunch (Hawaiian: pā mea ʻai) is a Hawaiian meal, roughly analogous to the Southern U.S. meat-and-three or Japanese bento box. The combination of Polynesian, North American and East Asian cuisine arose naturally in Hawaii, and has spread beyond it.

Standard plate lunches consist of one or two scoops of white rice, macaroni salad (in an American style), and an entrée (usually in a Japanese style such as chicken katsu or teriyaki or Korean such as Kalbi otherwise known as Beef Short Ribs). A plate lunch with more than one entrée is often called a "mixed plate".

== Origins ==
Although the exact origin of the Hawaiian plate lunch is disputed, according to Professor Jon Okamura of the University of Hawaiʻi, the plate lunch likely grew out of the Japanese bento, because "bentos were take away kinds of eating and certainly the plate lunch continues that tradition". Its appearance in Hawaii in recognizable form goes back to the 1880s when plantation workers were in high demand by the fruit and sugar companies on the islands. Laborers were brought to Hawaii from around the world, including from China, Japan, Portugal, and the Philippines. Kaui Philpotts, former food editor of the Honolulu Advertiser, notes that the laborers "didn't eat sandwiches or things like that; it was leftover rice and a lot of things like canned meat or teriyaki or cold meat or maybe scrambled eggs or pickles, and almost no salad or vegetable." Later on, macaroni salad and cabbage was added to the plates, as it seemed to bridge national tastes and also mixed well with the various types of meat. Some locations also include the traditional Korean side dish kimchi.

As the days of the plantations came to an end, plate lunches began to be served on-site by lunch wagons to construction workers and day laborers. Later, local hole-in-the-wall restaurants and other stand-alone plate lunch restaurants began popping up, then plate lunch franchises. Eventually, these made their way to the U.S. mainland such as the former L&L Drive-Inn chain in California in 1999. L&L founder Eddie Flores rebranded it "L&L Hawaiian Barbecue", explaining that "When we went to the mainland, the name 'Hawaiian' is a draw, because everyone just fantasized, everyone wants to come to Hawaii."

== Popular entrées ==
Popular plate lunch entrées reflect Polynesian, North American and East Asian influence.

Japanese entrées include chicken katsu (fried boneless chicken breaded with panko) and beef teriyaki.

Korean entrées include kalbi and meat jun.

Other Asian ethnic contributions include Chinese-influenced char siu pork, the Okinawan shoyu pork (Okinawan: rafute), and Filipino chicken adobo and longanisa (a traditional Spanish sausage). Western European dishes include linguiça, a traditional Portuguese sausage.

Entrées of Hawaiian origin include kālua puaʻa (roast pork) and laulau (pork or other meat or fish wrapped in a taro leaf). Some Hawaiian side dishes are lomi-lomi salmon (salmon salad) and haupia (a coconut dessert).

The traditional mayonnaise-based macaroni salad is an American contribution. Another notably American element is the hamburger steak, a ground beef patty smothered with brown gravy served atop rice; adding a sunny-side-up egg makes it a loco moco.

Other common side dishes with plate lunches include fried noodles, often chow mein, chow fun or saimin; the Hawaiian taegu, a dish made of shredded codfish; and Korean kongnamul muchim, a dish made of seasoned soybean sprouts.

Plate lunches

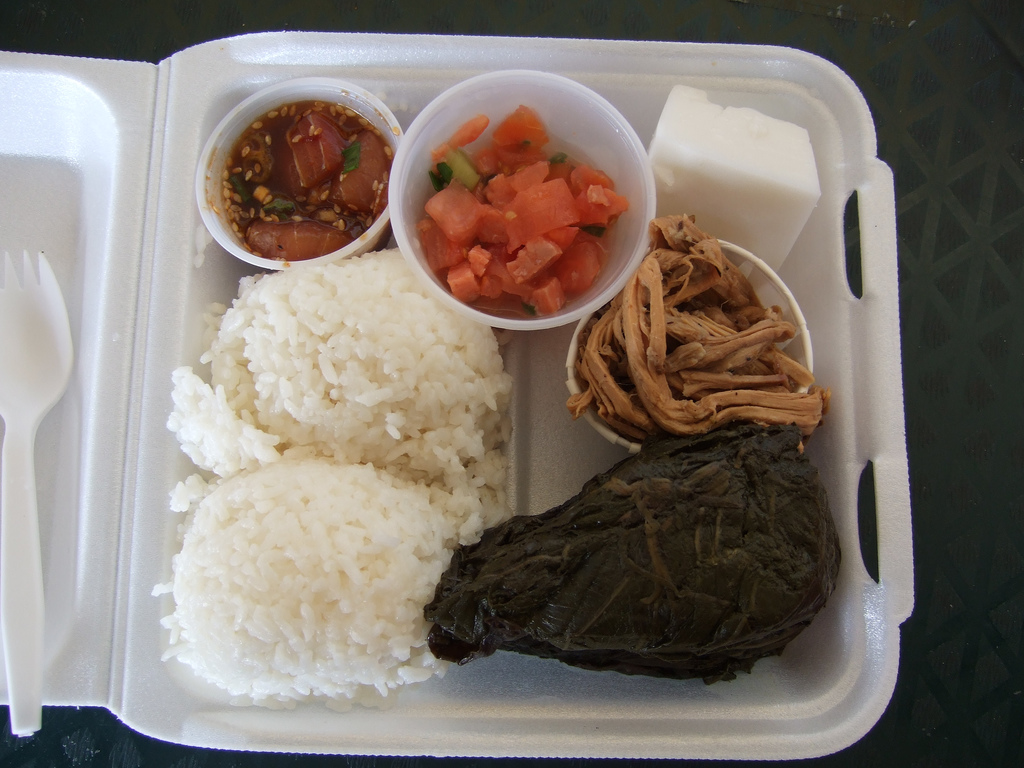
Traditional Hawaiian plate lunch. Clockwise, from bottom left: two scoops of white rice, ahi poke, lomi-lomi salmon, haupia dessert, kālua puaʻa (roast pork), and pork laulau.

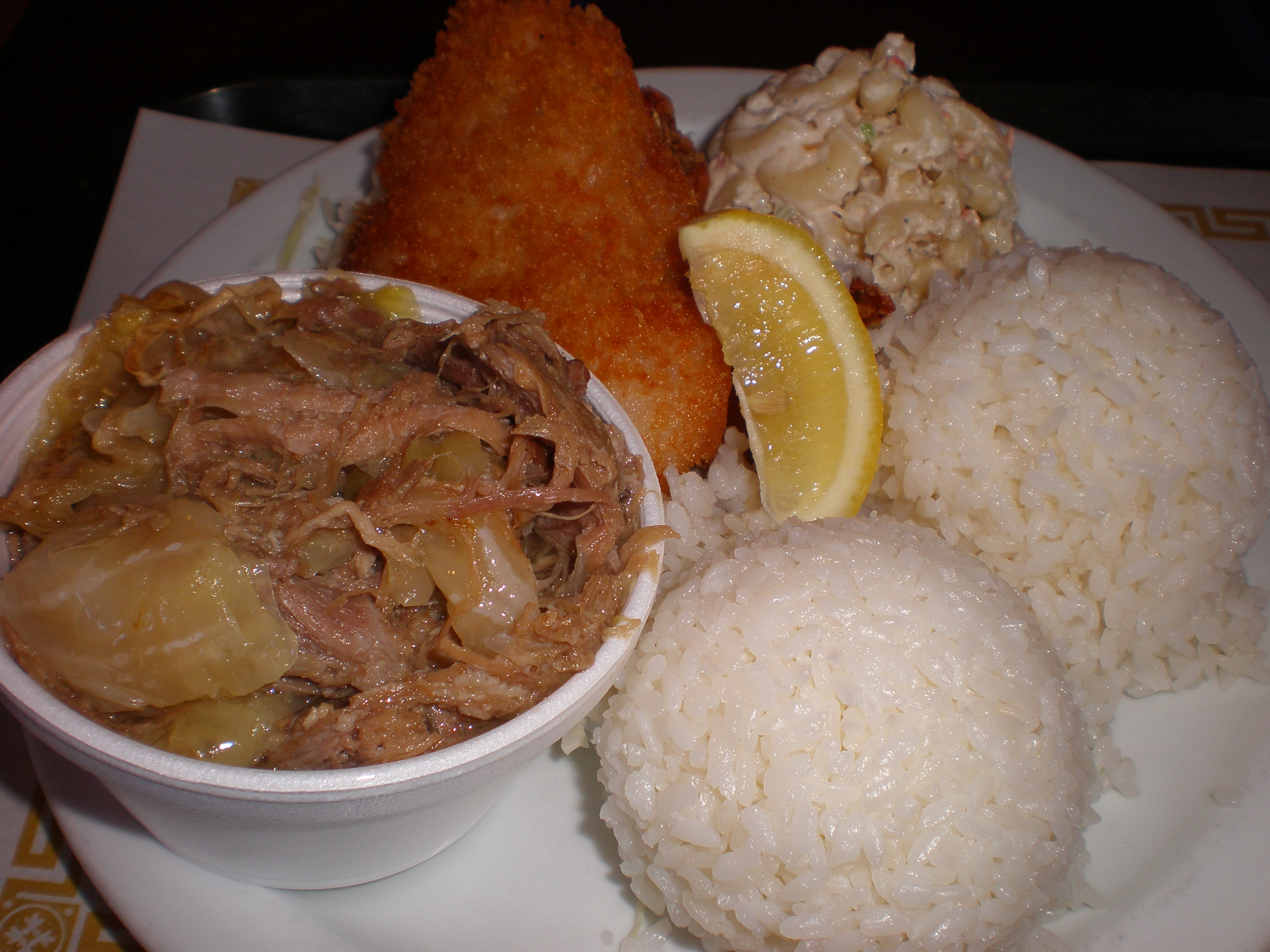
Kālua pork combination plate lunch

== See also ==
- Cuisine of Hawaii – Food and drinks from Hawaii
- Okazuya – Japanese-style delicatessen in Hawaii
