= Teriyaki =

Japanese marinade

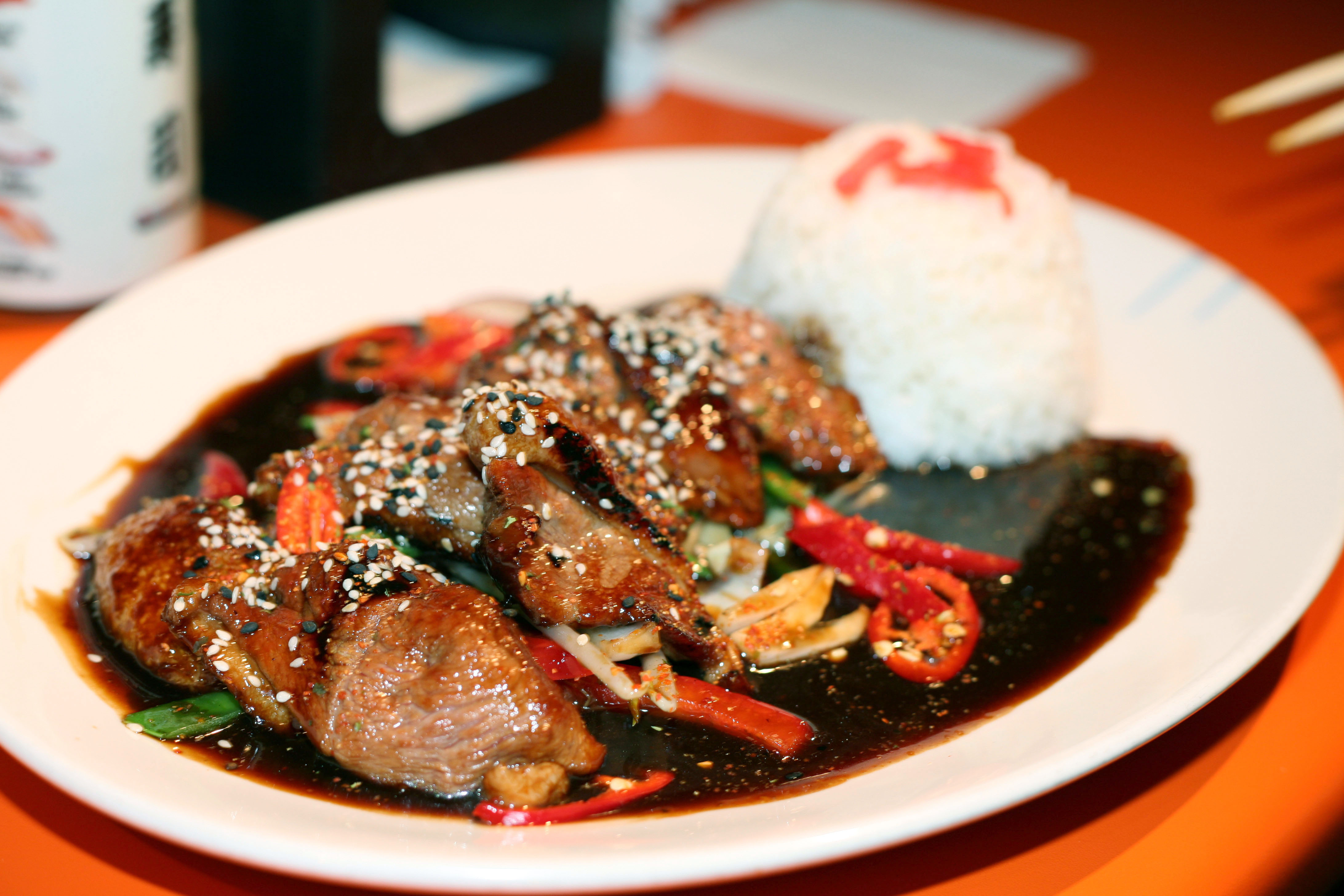
- Teriyaki duck
- Course: Main course
- Place of origin: Japan
- Similar dishes: Yakitori, plate lunch

Teriyaki (Japanese: 照り焼き) is a cooking technique in which foods are broiled or grilled with a glaze of soy sauce, mirin, and sugar. The cooking technique is commonly associated with Japanese cuisine and has since spread globally; teriyaki can also refer to a specific type of fast food meal originated in the Seattle area of the United States.

Fish – yellowtail, marlin, skipjack tuna, salmon, trout, and mackerel – are mainly used in Japan, while white and red meats – chicken, pork, lamb, and beef – are more often used in the West. Other ingredients sometimes used in Japan include squid, hamburger steak, and meatballs.

The word teriyaki derives from the noun teri (照り), which refers to a shine or luster given by the sugar content in the tare (タレ), and yaki (焼き), which refers to the cooking method of grilling or broiling. Traditionally the meat is dipped in or brushed with sauce during cooking. It is believed that teriyaki in Japan evolved during the 1600s.

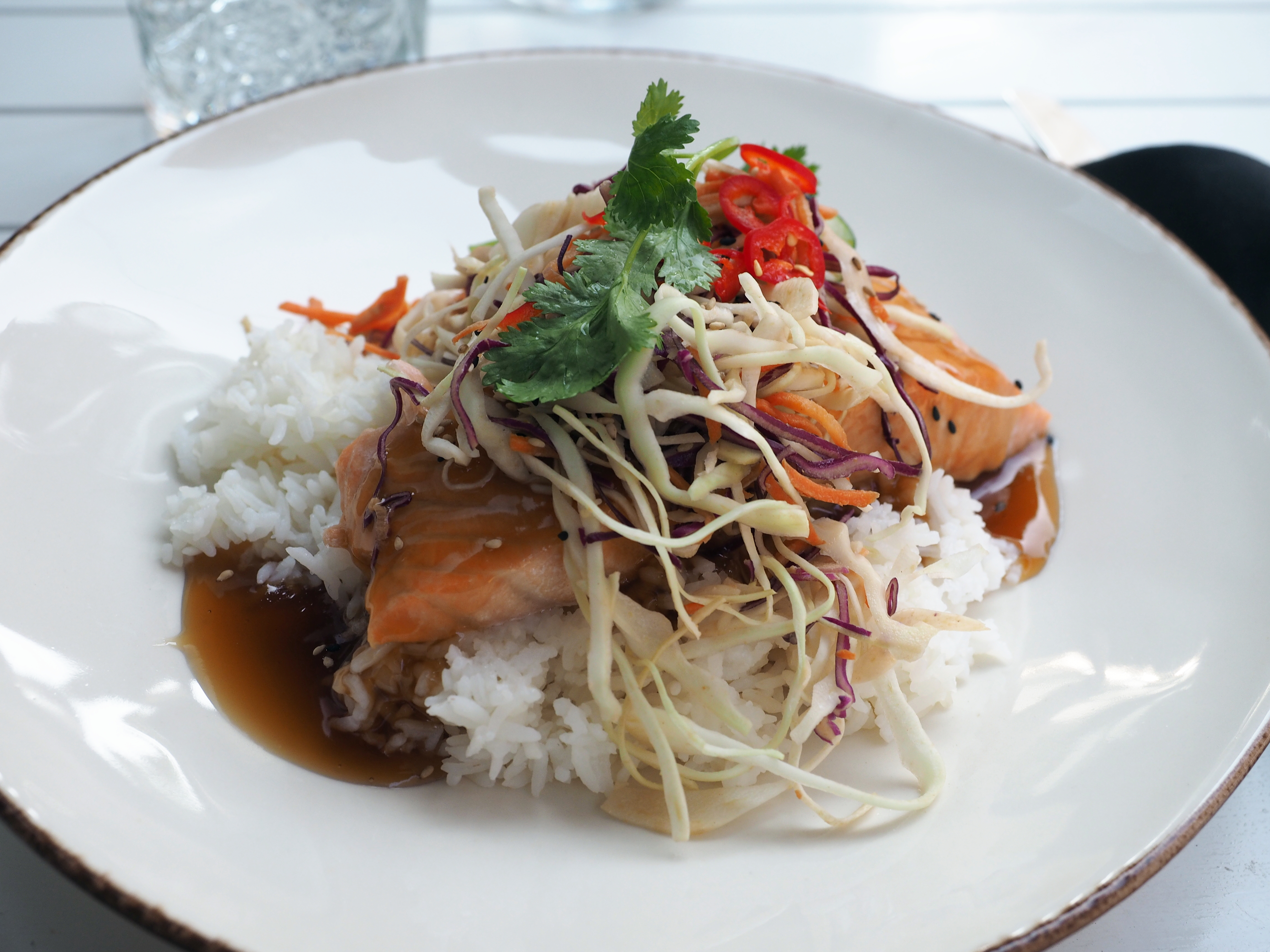
Salmon teriyaki

The tare is traditionally made by blending soy sauce, sake (or mirin), and sugar over heat. The sauce is boiled and reduced to the desired thickness, then used to marinate meat, which is then grilled or broiled. Sometimes ginger is added and the final dish may be garnished with spring onions.

== Variations ==
A teriyaki burger (テリヤキバーガー) is a variety of hamburger either topped with teriyaki sauce or with the sauce worked into the ground meat patty. According to George Motz, the dish has its roots in Japan.

"Teriyaki stir-fry" refers to stir-frying meat or vegetables and tossing them in teriyaki sauce. Vegetarian ingredients may also be cooked teriyaki-style.

== Origins ==
=== Japan ===
Teriyaki emerged as a cooking technique during the Edo period in Japan.

=== United States ===
==== Teriyaki sauce ====
In North America, any dish made with a teriyaki-like sauce is described using the word teriyaki. This often even includes those using foreign alternatives to sake or mirin, or with added ingredients, such as sesame or garlic (uncommon in traditional Japanese cuisine). The sauce used for teriyaki is generally sweet, although it can also be spicy. Pineapple juice is sometimes used, as it not only provides sweetness but also bromelain enzymes that help tenderize the meat. Grilling meat first and pouring the sauce on afterwards or using sweet sauce as a marinade are other non-traditional methods of cooking teriyaki. Teriyaki sauce is sometimes put on chicken wings or used as a dipping sauce.

==== Hawaii ====
Teriyaki was brought to Hawaii by Japanese immigrants and evolved based on local ingredients and preferences. Teriyaki entrées are popular components of the Hawaiian plate lunch.

==== Seattle ====
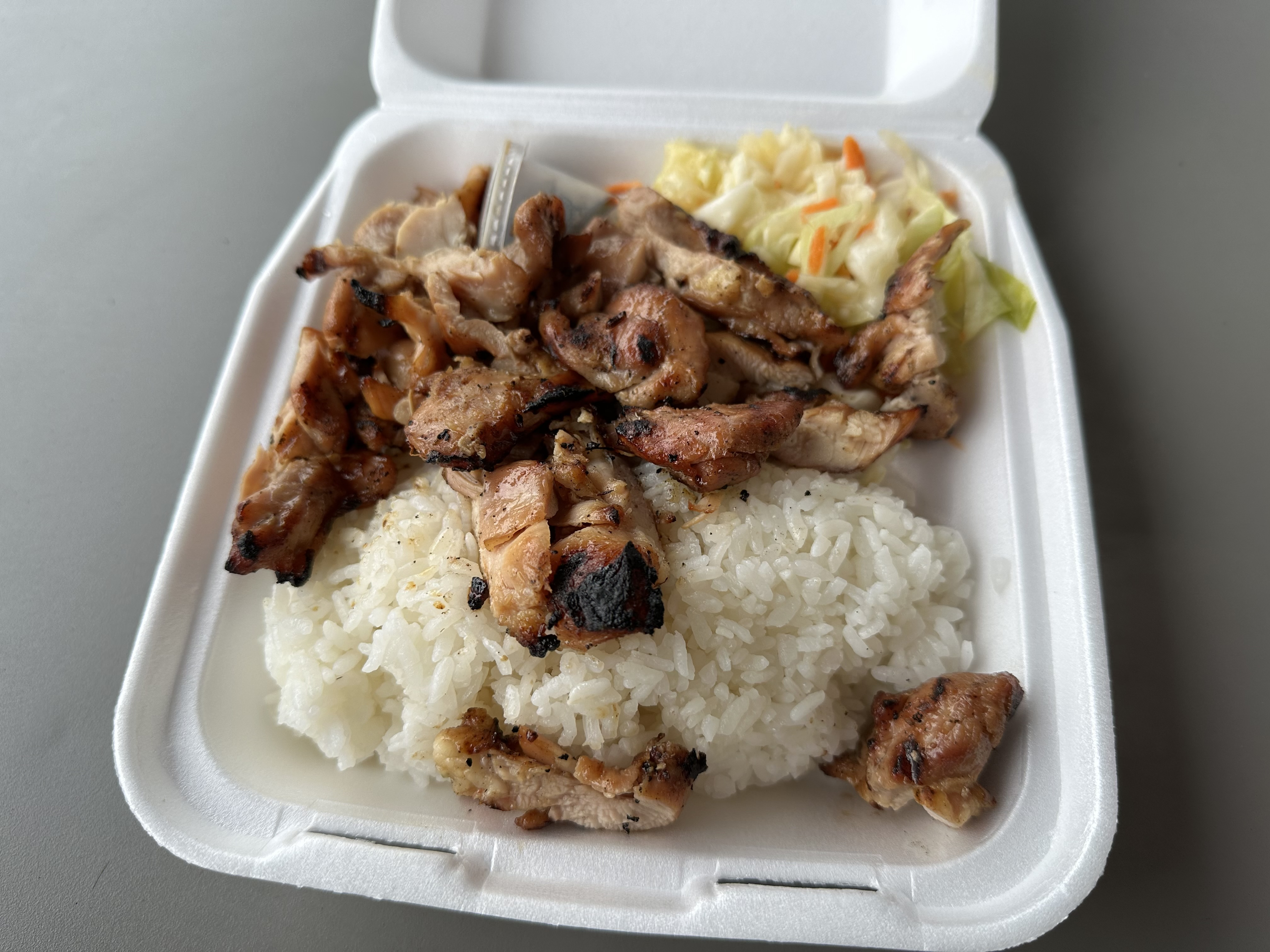
A plate lunch of chicken teriyaki (with rice and slaw)

In the city of Seattle, Washington, a large teriyaki culture emerged in the 1990s. As of 2010, there were over 83 restaurants in the city with "teriyaki" in their name. It has been described as the city's signature cuisine by some outlets, noting its widespread adoption as a form of fast food.

The first standalone teriyaki restaurant, Toshi's Teriyaki, opened in the Lower Queen Anne neighborhood of Seattle in 1976. The restaurant's low-cost chicken and beef skewers in teriyaki sauce inspired other restaurants in the area. Toshi's later expanded into a chain with 17 locations in the Seattle area by 1996.

== See also ==
- Asado
- Sweet soy sauce
- List of cooking techniques
- Yoshida Foods International (manufacturer of teriyaki sauce)
