= Fusilli =

Corkscrew or helicoidal shaped pasta

- Alternative names: Rotini (United States)
- Type: Pasta
- Place of origin: Italy

Fusilli (Italian: [fuˈzilli]) are a variety of pasta from southern Italy, with a helical (corkscrew) or helicoidal shape, also known as rotini in the United States and Canada.

== Etymology ==
Fusillo, the singular form of fusilli, means 'little spindle' in Italian. Fusilli are traditionally made by wrapping pasta dough around a spindle, or fuso in Italian. Fusilli are believed to be of Arab derivation, and are known as busiata in Sicily and busa in Sardinia, the two Italian regions where Muslim civilization first penetrated. Both busiata and busa come from the Arabic word bus (بوص), meaning the thin reed around which the dough was traditionally wound to make the pasta.

== Variants ==
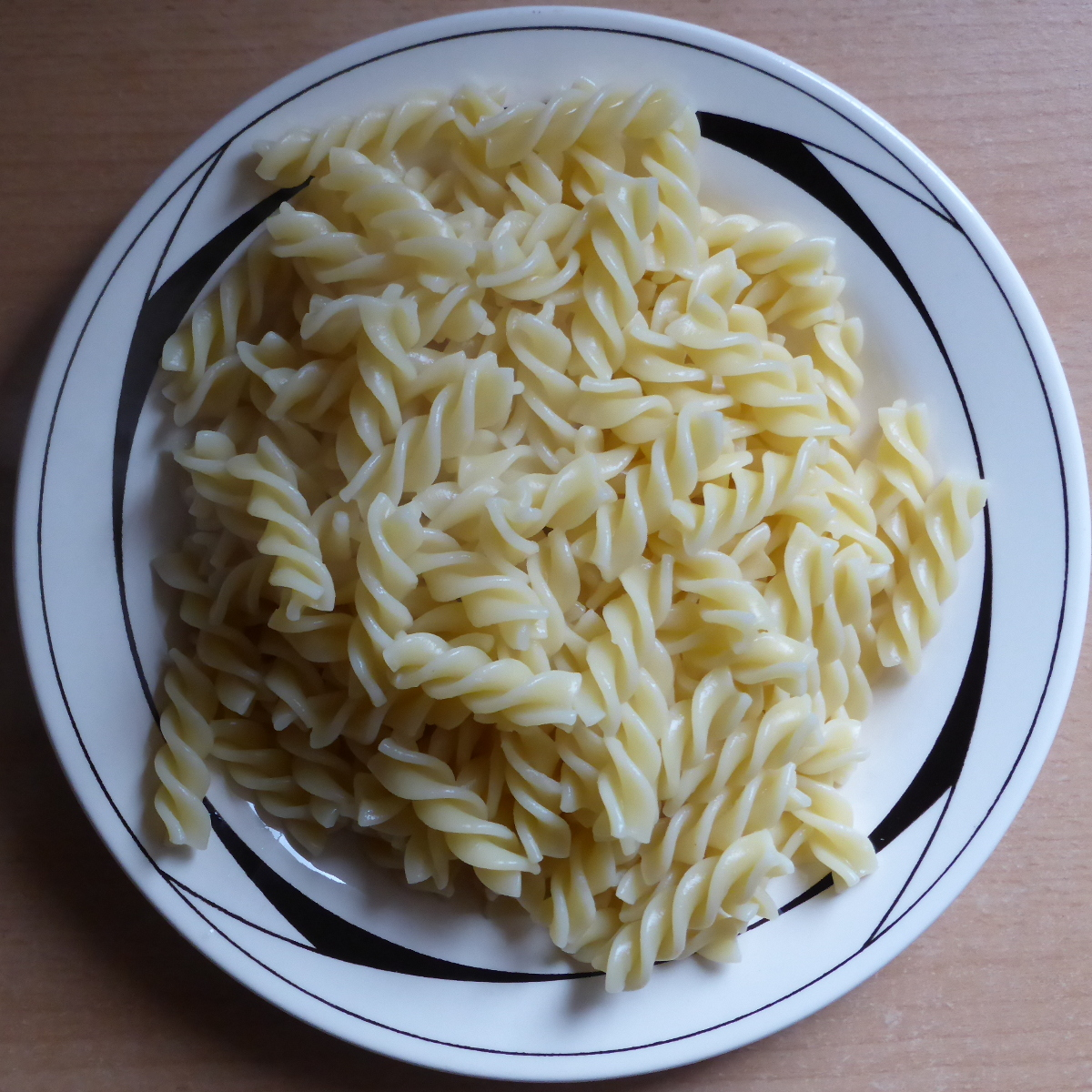
Cooked fusilli

There are multiple regional Italian varieties of fusilli, which can be either extruded or hand-formed, solid (helicoidal) or hollow (helical), and short or long.

=== Fusilli ===
The common extruded solid short helicoidal variety is known simply as fusilli. The long version is known as fusilli Sorrento. Larger versions are known as fusilloni and Colonne Pompei, for the short and long varieties, respectively.

An elongated version that has a double-braided appearance is known as fusilli Capri.

=== Fusilli bucati ===
The common extruded hollow helical (corkscrew) variety is known as fusilli bucati (lit. 'hollow fusilli') and is produced in short (corti) and long (lunghi) forms.

Hand-formed versions of this are made by wrapping pasta dough around a spindle at varying sizes, and are named after their areas of origin (e.g. fusilli avellinesi from Avellino, fusilli napoletani from Naples, and fusilli di Gragnano from Gragnano). In Campania, these are sometimes served with Genovese sauce or beans.

=== Outside Italy ===
In the United States and Canada, extruded short helicoidal pasta is also commonly known as "rotini", which is frequently sold in both standard and tri-color varieties.

== See also ==
- List of pasta
