= Hamburg steak =

German patty of ground beef

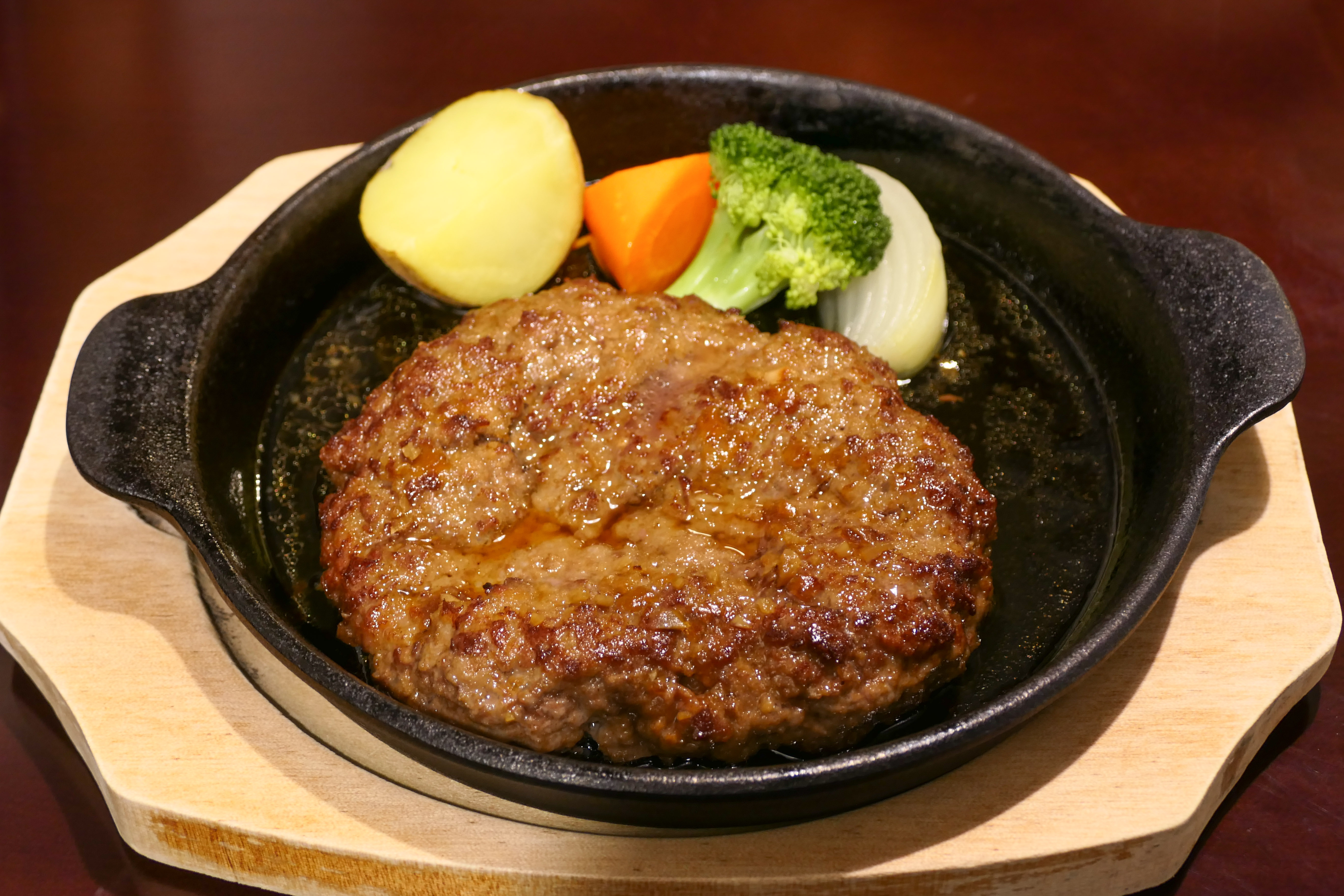
- A Hamburg steak
- Place of origin: Germany or United States
- Main ingredients: Beef

A Hamburg steak being prepared by a server in Japan, 2023

Hamburg steak is a patty of ground beef. Made popular worldwide by migrating Germans, it became a mainstream dish around the start of the 19th century. It is related to Salisbury steaks, which also use ground beef. It is considered the origin of the hamburger when, in the early 20th century, vendors began selling the Hamburg steak between bread as a sandwich.

== History ==
The German equivalent of the Hamburg steak is the Frikadelle, also known as a Bulette, which is known to have existed in the 17th century.

In the late 19th century, the Hamburg steak became popular on the menus of many restaurants in the port of New York. This kind of fillet was beef ground by hand, lightly salted, often smoked, and usually served raw in a dish along with onions and bread crumbs. The oldest document that refers to the Hamburg steak in English is a Delmonico's Restaurant menu from 1873 that offered customers an 11-cent plate (equal to $2.96 today) of Hamburg steak that had been developed by American chef Charles Ranhofer (1836–1899). This price was high for the time, twice the price of a simple fillet of beef steak. By the end of the century, the Hamburg steak was gaining popularity because of its ease of preparation and decreasing cost. This is evident from its detailed description in some of the most popular cookbooks of the day. Documents show that this preparation style was used by 1887 in some US restaurants and was also used for feeding patients in hospitals; the Hamburg steak was served raw or lightly cooked and was accompanied by a raw egg.

The menus of many American restaurants during the 19th century included a Hamburg beefsteak that was often sold for breakfast. A variant of Hamburg steak is Salisbury steak, which is usually served with a gravy similar in texture to brown sauce. Invented by Dr. James Salisbury (1823–1905), the term Salisbury steak has been used in the United States since 1897.

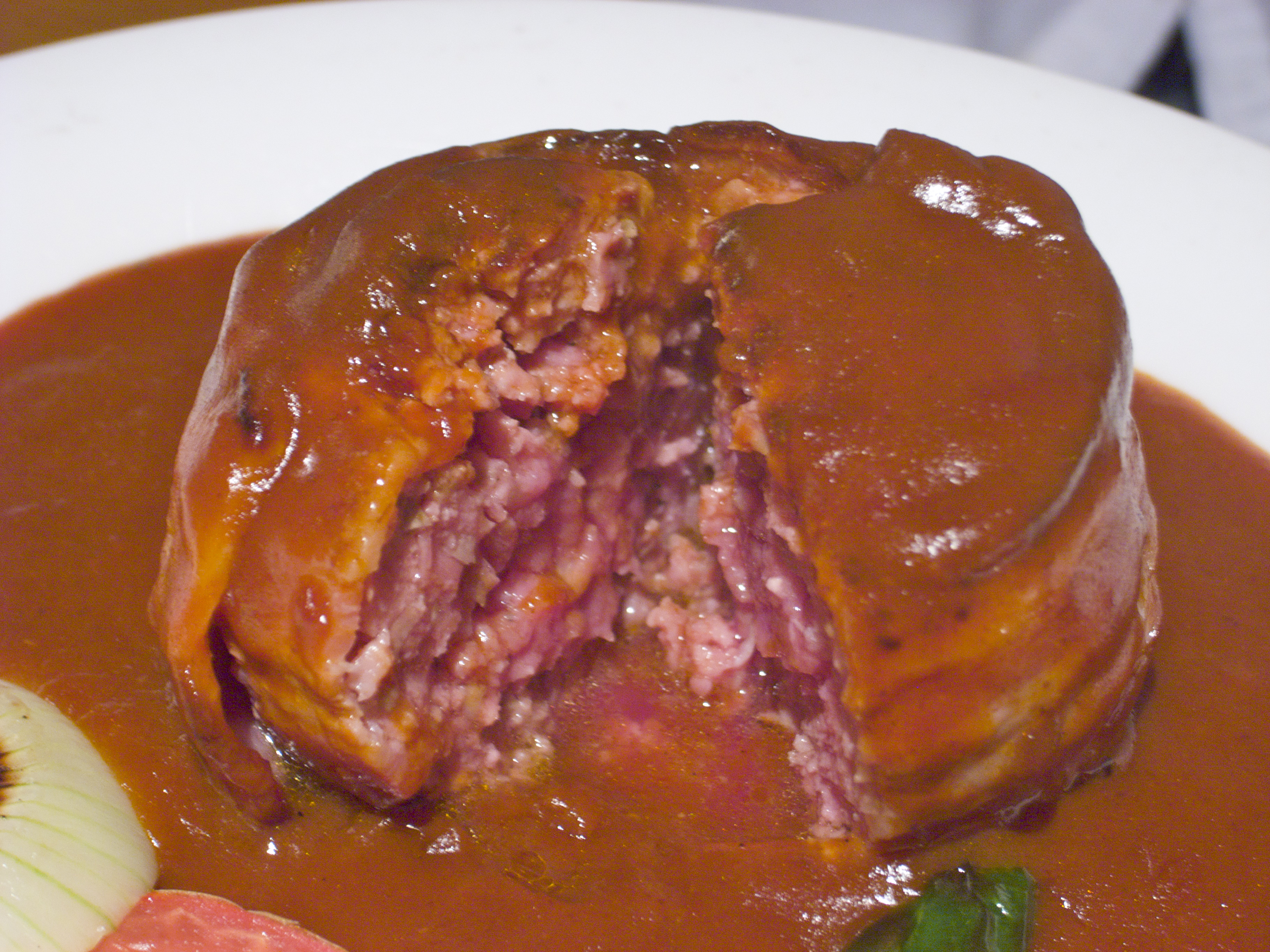
Close-up view of a Hamburg steak

By 1930, Hamburg steaks were usually served as part of a sandwich known as a hamburger; the meat part of the sandwich became known as a patty. The term "hamburger" has, in turn often been shortened to simply "burger". "Burger" is now commonly used as a suffix to create new words for different variants of the hamburger, including cheeseburger, chickenburger, porkburger, baconburger, and mooseburger.

== Preparation ==
Hamburg steak is made from finely ground beef. Seasoning, egg, breadcrumb, onion, and milk may be combined with the meat which is then formed into patties and cooked by frying, roasting, or smoking.

== Around the world ==
Hamburg steak is listed by Escoffier as a classic dish in haute cuisine.

=== Japan ===
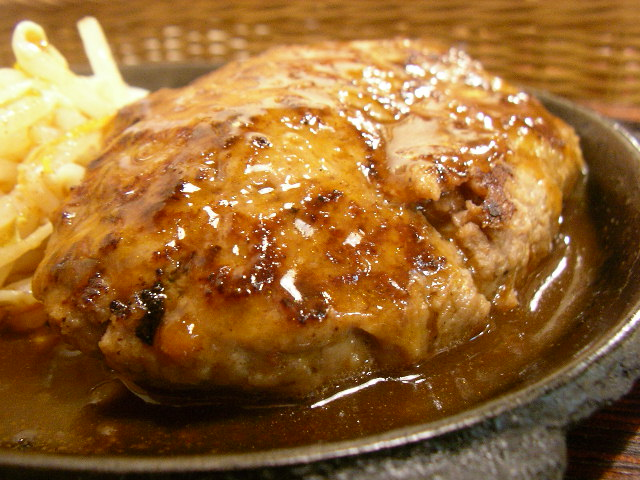
A Japanese hanbāgu steak

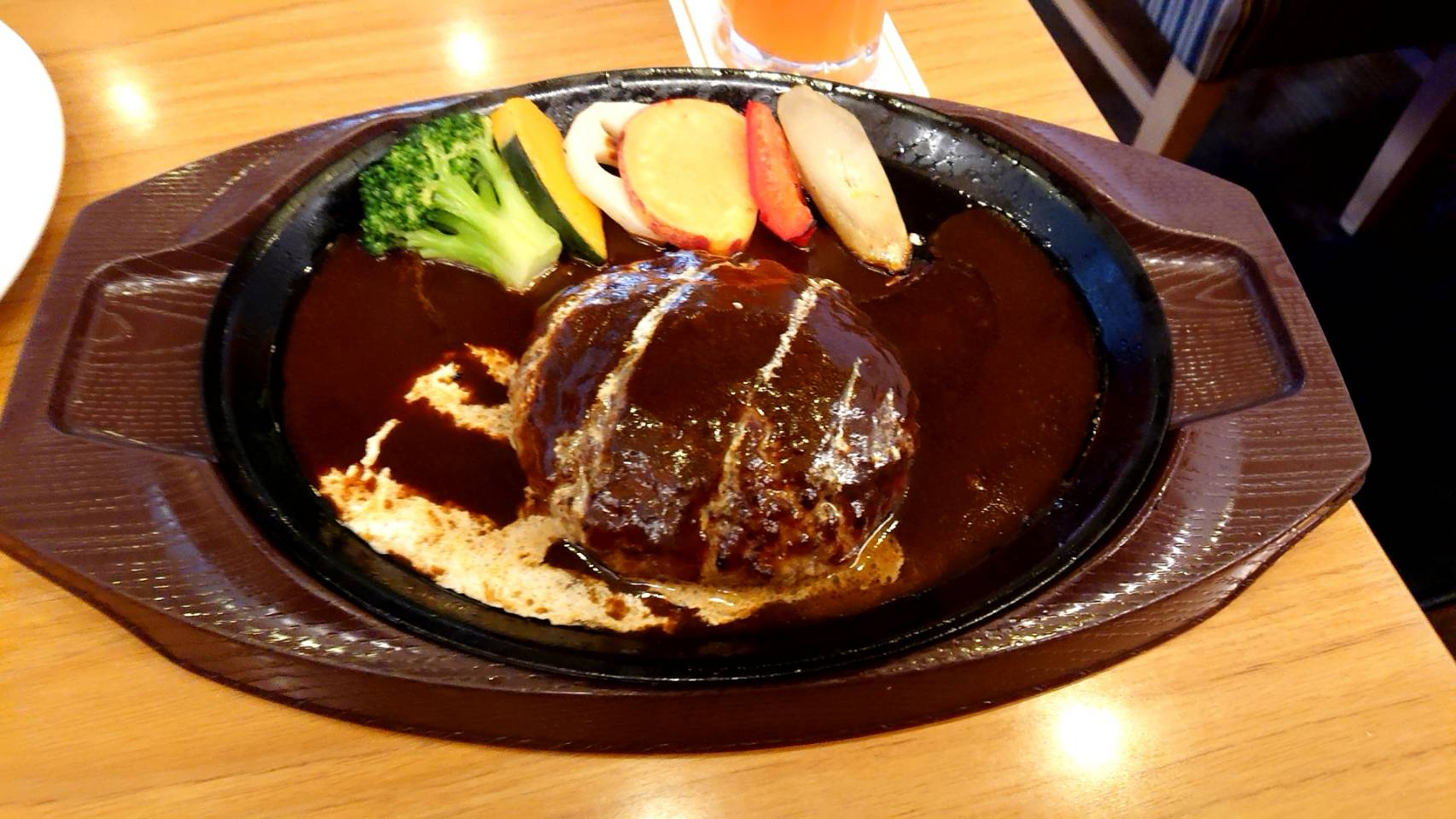
Cheese on Hamburg

Hamburg (ハンバーグ, hanbāgu) is a popular dish in Japan. It is made from ground meat with finely chopped onion, egg, and breadcrumbs flavored with various spices, and made into a flat, oval shape about 4 cm thick and 10 to 15 cm in diameter. Many restaurants specialize in various styles of Hamburg steak. Some variations include hanbāgu topped with cheese (チーズハンバーグ, or chīzuhanbāgu), hanbāgu with Japanese curry, and Italian hanbāgu (with tomato sauce rather than demi-glace). In Japan, it is more commonly made from a mixture of ground pork and ground beef (called aibikiniku in Japan). If only beef is used instead of pork, the restaurant will usually indicate this.

Hamburg steak became popular during the 1960s as a more affordable way to serve otherwise costly meat. Magazines regularly printed the recipe during that decade, elevating it to a staple dish in Japanese culture. In Japan, the dish dates back to the Meiji period and is believed to have been first served in Yokohama, which was one of the first ports opened to foreigners. Since the 1980s, vacuum-packed hamburgers with pre-added sauce have been available and are commonly used in boxed lunches (bento). Frozen hamburgers are popular, as well, and are often served in fast-food style restaurants.

=== Other countries ===
In Hawaii, Hamburg steak is very similar to the Japanese hanbāgu. It consists of a burger patty with brown gravy. It is usually served with macaroni salad and rice in a plate lunch. Another variety includes an egg, which is called loco moco.

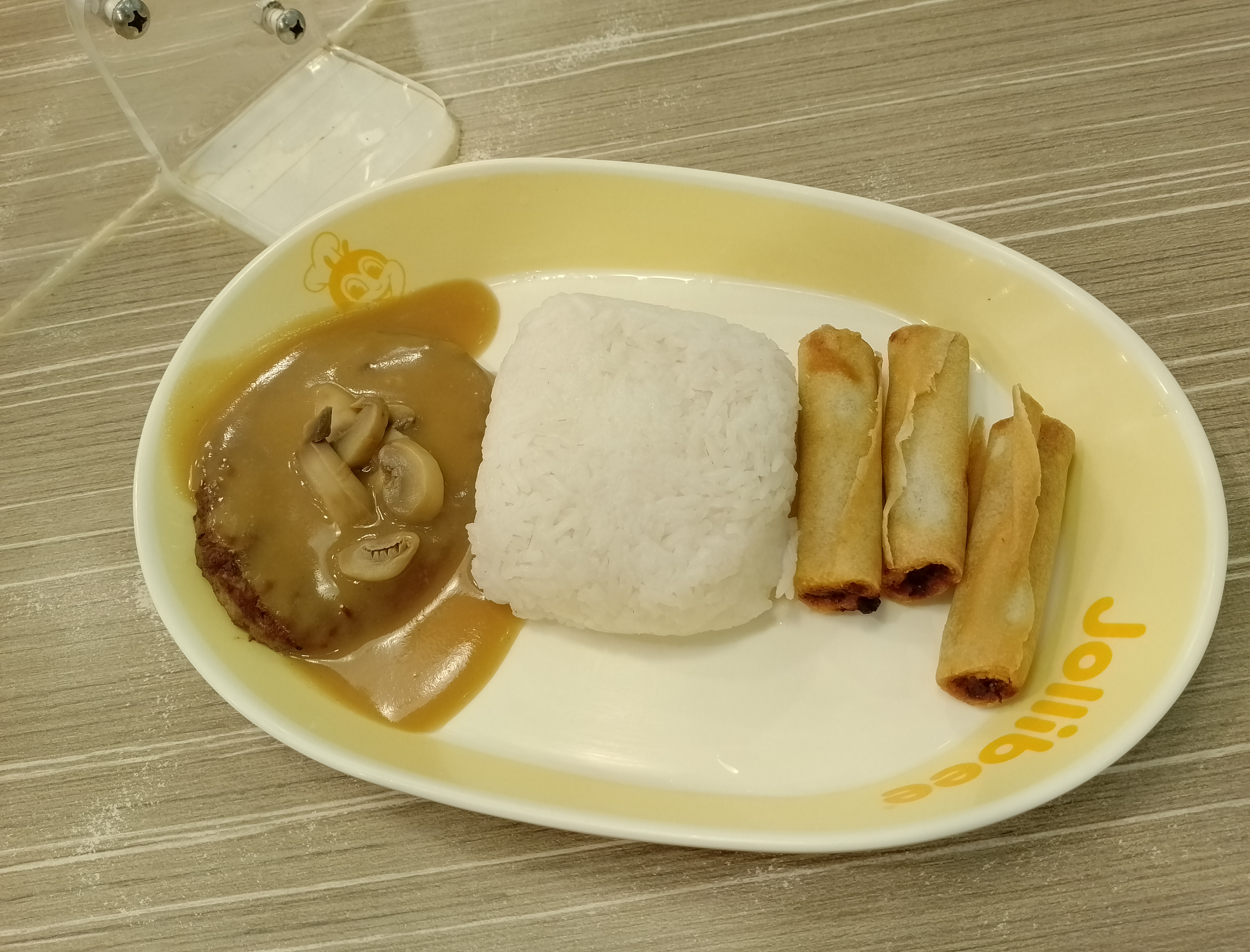
A Jollibee Burger Steak with an additional lumpia

In the Philippines, Hamburg steaks are a popular menu item from the fast food chain Jollibee (where they are called "burger steaks"), and are served with gravy, mushrooms, and a side of steamed or adobo fried rice.

In Australia, it is referred to as a Rissole. Often made at BBQ events and also known for being a menu item at Returned Servicemen's League (RSL) clubs. Various sauces and side dishes can be served with it.

In Finland, the dish is called jauhelihapihvi ("ground meat steak") and is prepared and served like a meatball: pan-fried, and served with potatoes and brown sauce.

In Denmark, a Hamburg steak is called hakkebøf ("ground steak"). It is traditionally served with sautéed onions, boiled potatoes and vegetables, hakkebøf med bløde løg, or in a sandwich with brown sauce, bøfsandwich.

== See also ==
- Cutlet
- Frikadelle

== Bibliography ==
- McWilliams, Mark (2012). The Story Behind the Dish. ABC-CLIO. ISBN 9780313385100.
