= Macaroni salad =

Type of pasta salad

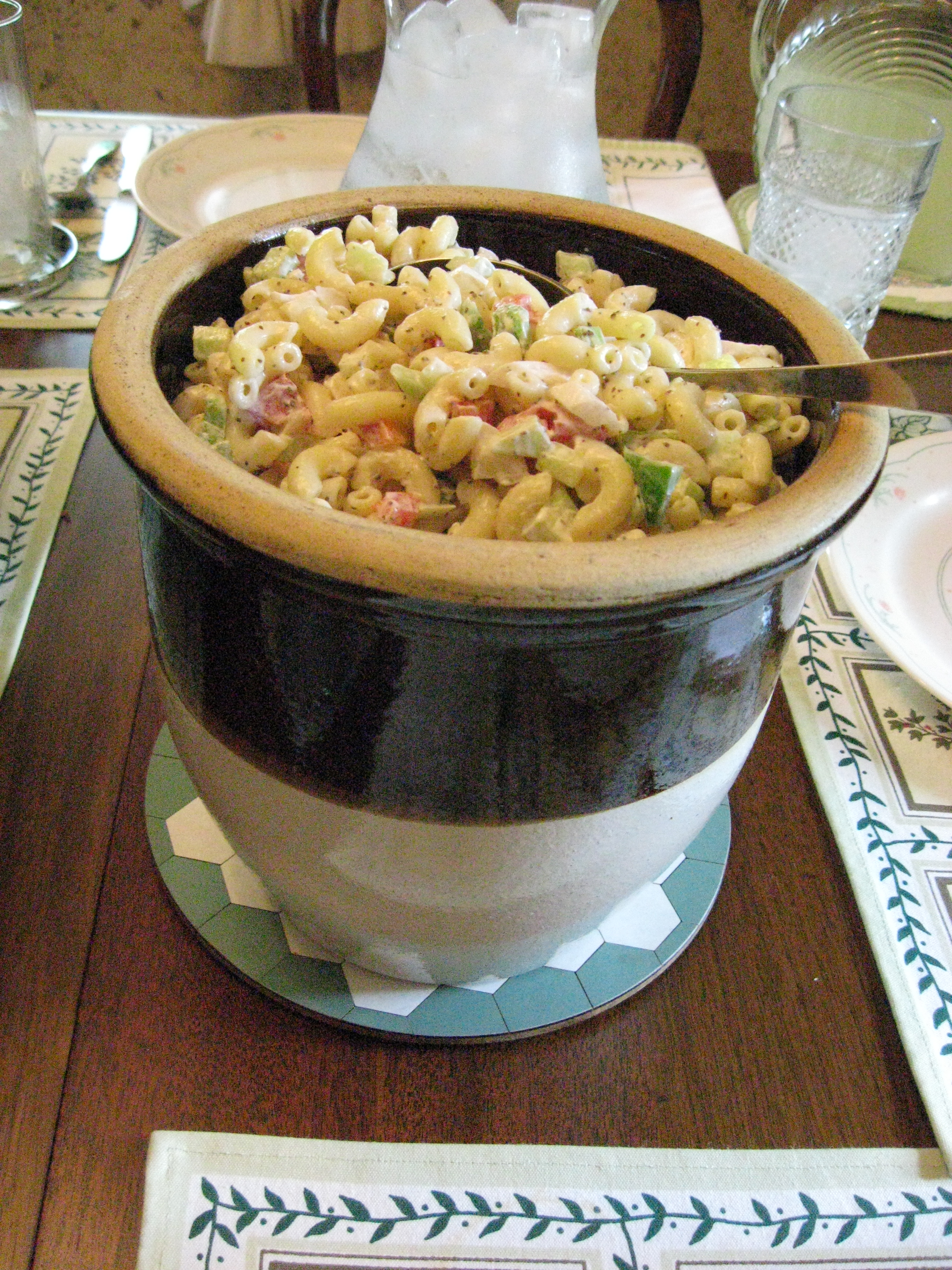
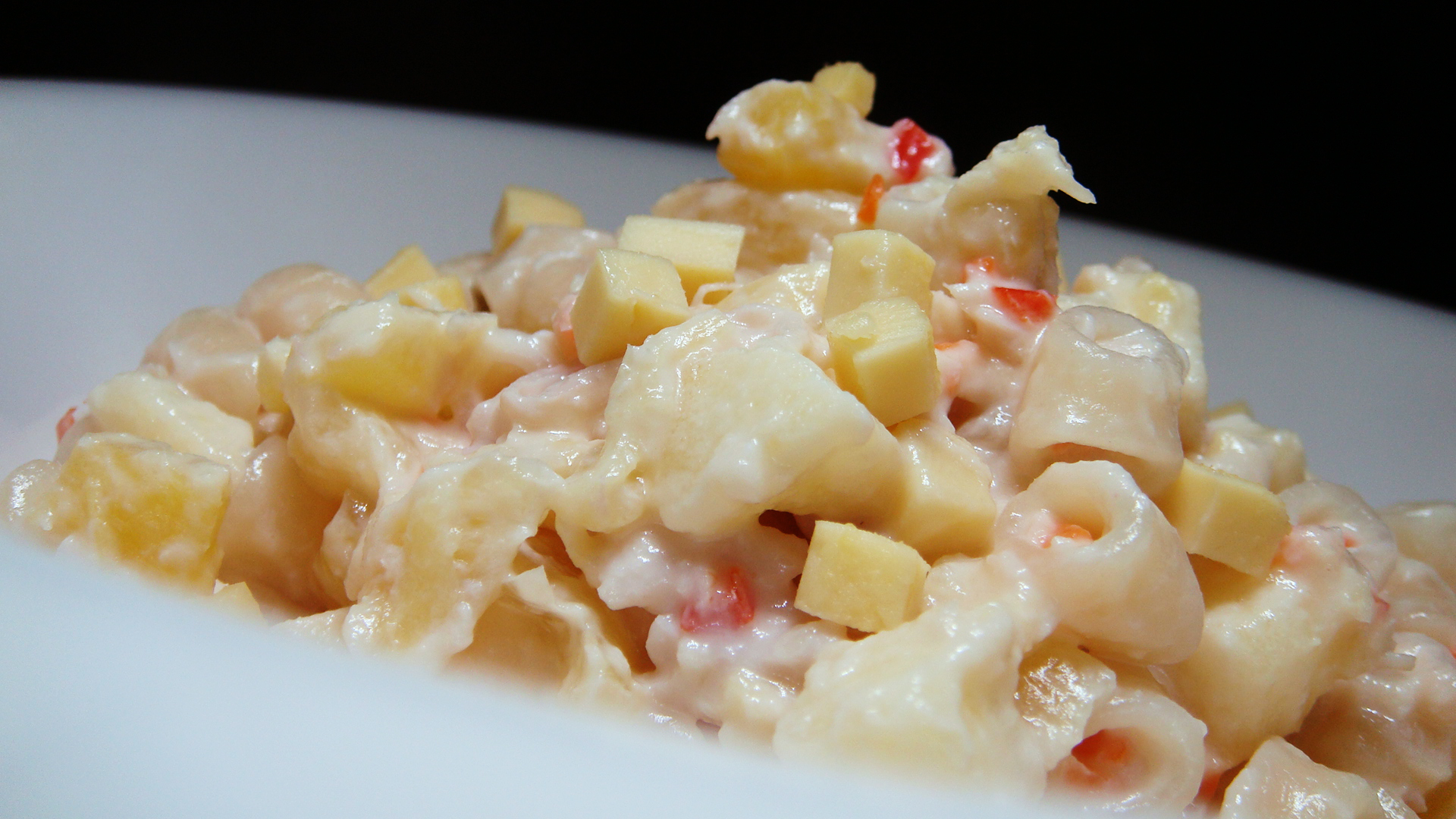
- Top: Macaroni salad from Dayton, Virginia; Bottom: Filipino chicken macaroni salad
- Type: Salad
- Course: Side dish or appetizer
- Serving temperature: Cold
- Main ingredients: Macaroni, usually mayonnaise, onions, pickles, celery

Macaroni salad is a type of pasta salad also referred to as "mac salad", served cold, made with cooked elbow macaroni and usually prepared with mayonnaise. Much like potato salad or coleslaw in its use, it is often served as a side dish to barbecue, fried chicken, or other picnic-style dishes. Like any dish, national and regional variations abound but generally it is prepared with raw diced onions, dill or sweet pickles and celery and seasoned with salt and pepper.

== By country ==
=== Australia and New Zealand ===
In Australia and New Zealand, it is commonly known as pasta salad, which is usually made with cooked shell pasta pieces and bought from supermarket delis.

=== Philippines ===
In the Philippines, macaroni salad is a dessert or appetizer with a mildly sweet flavor. It does not use onions, pepper, or celery. It typically uses native sweetened jellies, cheese, as well as various fruits in contrast to western macaroni salads. It is commonly consumed during holidays such as Christmas and New Year's Day, as well as parties and gatherings. A common variant adds shredded chicken and is known as chicken salad or chicken macaroni salad.

=== United States ===
In the United States, macaroni salad has been described as a "deli staple". In Hawaii, macaroni salad is a popular staple in plate lunches and is traditionally made with grated onion and macaroni cooked until very soft. In Puerto Rico, macaroni salad may contain mayonnaise, mustard, canned tuna or bits of Spam, onions, Cubanelle peppers and pimentos.

== See also ==
- List of pasta dishes
- List of salads
- Pasta salad
- Sopas
- Filipino spaghetti
- Garbage Plate
