= One-side =

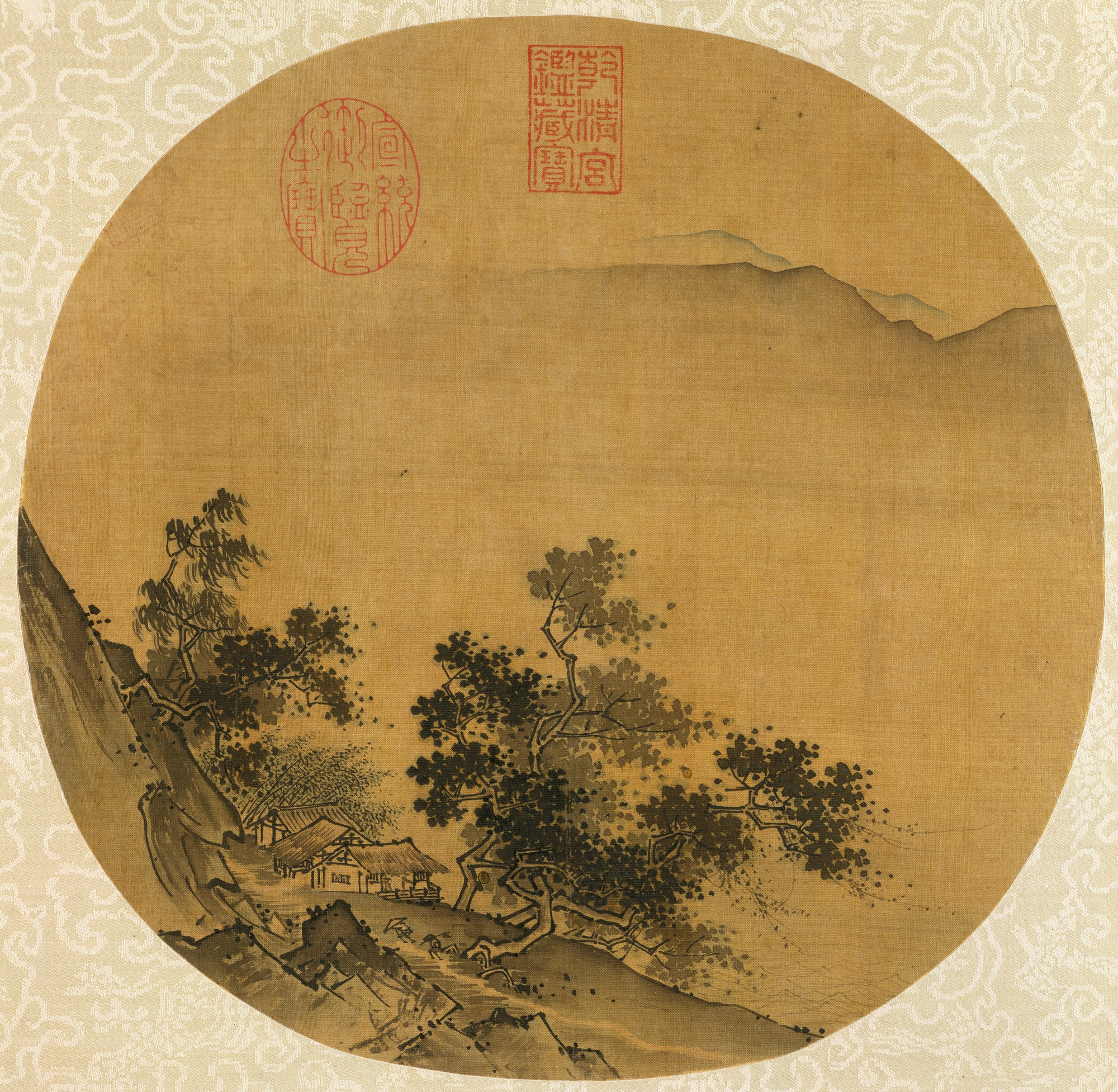
"Returning Home in a Driving Rain", an imitation of Xia Gui's painting illustrating the "Xia's One-Side" composition.

"One-Side" or "Xia's One-Side" (Chinese traditional: 夏半邊; Chinese simplified: 夏半边), just like "One-Corner" or "Ma's One-Corner", is also a particular type of composition in traditional Chinese painting. In this composition, the painters pushed the actual subjects of the painting to one side of the painting and made the other side empty implying a background of mist or snow. An imitation of master Xia Gui's 夏圭 landscape painting, "Returning Home in a Driving Rain", clearly illustrates how the artist arranged all of the trees, houses, and rocks at the bottom side of the painting and set them against the top empty portion of the painting where mist and distant mountains were lightly depicted--the two read stamps were not a part of the original painting.

"One-Side" composition is similar and related to "One-Corner" composition. Additional examples can be found in the collection of The Metropolitan Museum of Art. In Chinese, the term "Xia's One-Side" or Xia banbian 夏半边 literally means "Xia's half-side". Xia is the family name of Master Xia Gui of the Southern Song dynasty, who was the cofounder with his contemporary Ma Yuan of the Ma-Xia school of Chinese painting.
