= Zou Heng =

Chinese archaeologist (1927–2005)

- 邹衡
- Zou, 1987
- Born: January 30, 1927; Yonghe, Li County, Hunan, China
- Died: December 27, 2005 (aged 78); Beijing, China
- Awards: Shimada Prize (2001)

Academic background
- Education: Peking University

Academic work
- Discipline: Archaeology
- Sub-discipline: Shang and Zhou dynasties
- Institutions: Peking University

Zou Heng
- Chinese: 邹衡
Transcriptions
Standard Mandarin
- Hanyu Pinyin: Zōu Héng
- Wade–Giles: Tsou^{1} Heng^{2}

Zou Heng (January 30, 1927 – December 27, 2005) was a Chinese archaeologist. Born in rural Hunan, he became a refugee following the outbreak of the Second Sino-Japanese War, eventually settling in Santai County, Sichuan, where he graduated from middle school. He briefly enrolled in Peking University as a law student, but switched his study to history due to the rapid legal reforms of the Chinese Communist Party government. He graduated in 1952, and was admitted as the first graduate student of the university's archaeology program. Advised by Su Bingqi and Zhang Zhenglang, he worked in field excavations in Luoyang and at the Erligang site. He began teaching in 1954, with a focus on the archaeology of the Shang and Zhou. He earned a Doctoral Candidate degree in 1955, the first archaeologist to earn such a degree under the People's Republic. After briefly teaching in Lanzhou, he was appointed as a lecturer at Peking, where he began to work at the Liulihe site.

Although able to evade persecution during the increased government scrutiny of the Anti-Rightist Campaign, Zou was subjected to struggle sessions and physical violence from students during the Cultural Revolution. He was sent to rural Jiangxi in 1969 to work as a poultry farmer, but returned to work at Liulihe in 1972. He quickly rose up the ranks upon his return to Peking, obtaining an associate professorship in 1979 and a full professorship in 1983. In 1977, he published Shang Zhou Kaogu, a prominent archaeology textbook based on course material revised over the previous 20 years. From 1979 to 1994, Zou focused on the Zhou-era Tianma-Qucun site in Shanxi. By the late 1980s, this work was regularly interrupted by looters, and Zou ceased field duties to focus on cataloguing and documenting work at the site. Although pressured into retirement in 1996, he was awarded the American National Museum of Asian Art's Shimada Prize for his work, following the release of the four-volume report Tianma-Qucun 1980–89. He was diagnosed with cancer in 2004, and died the following year.

== Biography ==
=== Early life and education ===
Zou was born on January 30, 1927, in the Yonghe village of Li County, Hunan. He entered primary school late, enrolling at age eight. Following the outbreak of the Second Sino-Japanese War in 1937, he became a refugee. He attended eight different middle schools, eventually graduating from the National Middle School in Santai County, Sichuan, in 1946. (Note: Under Republican China's 6–3 school system, "middle school" refers to both junior middle school (grades 7–9) and senior middle school (grades 10–12).) He enrolled in Peking University as a law student the following year, but transferred to the history department during the Chinese Civil War, recognizing that the nascent Communist government would replace the Republic's law codes. He studied under a large number of prominent scholars, including Xia Nai and Hu Shih.

After graduating in 1952, Zou was admitted as the sole graduate student of the university's nascent archaeology program. His main advisors during his graduate studies were Guo Baojun, Su Bingqi and Zhang Zhenglang. He entered a one-year archaeological training course at Luoyang, and the following year served as a supervisor during the excavation of the Han tombs at Shaogou, Luoyang. After this, he worked at the Erligang site under Pei Wenzhong. He reconstructed a number of pottery vessels from sherds, a relatively new technique in Chinese archaeology. In 1954, he taught his first class, covering Shang and Zhou bronzes, as part of an archaeological workers' training program. He would later compile an official report on the Erligang excavations. In 1955, he graduated from Peking University, becoming the first person to earn a Doctoral Candidate degree (equivalent to a PhD) in archaeology since the foundation of the People's Republic. He spent the next year teaching history at Lanzhou University and the Northwest Normal Institute, and was appointed as a lecturer at his alma mater.

=== Academic career and persecution ===
Zou never joined the Chinese Communist Party (CCP), and rarely voiced his political beliefs. During the late 1950s, he came under increasing government scrutiny during the CCP's Anti-Rightist Campaign, but was able to avoid persecution and continue his teaching despite years of government monitoring. Over the following years he supervised undergraduate training excavations at various locations in Hebei, Henan, and Beijing, ranging from the Neolithic period to the Liao dynasty. He took particular interest in the Liulihe site in southern Beijing, which he had first visited in 1962, identifying it as the ancient capital of the Yan state.

Zou's work at Liulihe was interrupted by a wave of academic repression during the Cultural Revolution. He was subject to a number of struggle sessions due to past suspicions of political insubordination. On one occasion, a group of his students allegedly beat him. He was sent to rural Jiangxi in 1969 to work as a poultry farmer. He was allowed to return around a year and a half later, and continued excavations at Liulihe from 1972 to 1974. During this time, he saved the site from being cleared to make way for farmland as part of the "Learn from Dazhai in agriculture" campaign. In 1973, he was sent to the rural suburbs of Beijing for some time. Despite political persecution, he continued his academic work in secret during the heights of the Cultural Revolution. He met with members of the American Art and Archaeology Delegation in 1973. Following the 1976 Tangshan earthquake, he refused to evacuate, unwilling to lose access to his personal library. In the late 1970s and early 1980s, after the end of the Cultural Revolution, Zou rapidly published a number of major works. He obtained an associate professorship at Peking University in 1979 and returned to teaching courses on Shang and Zhou archaeology.

==== Publications ====
From March 1976 to May 1977, Zou wrote an archaeological textbook entitled Shang Zhou Kaogu (Chinese: 商周考古; lit. 'Shang and Zhou Archaeology'). It was published by Wenwu Press in 1979 as the first broad-scale archaeological textbook published in China in several years. The textbook was based on course material compiled by Zou in the 1950s for his early archaeological classes at Peking, itself derived from training materials from his predecessor Guo Baojun. Earlier attempts were made to revise the material in 1960 and 1972 (the latter in collaboration with Li Boqian), but these were never put to print for unknown reasons, instead serving as bases for the 1977 edition. Zou was not listed as the author in the book due to the significant contribution from earlier archaeologists. Shang Zhou Kaogu reached national prominence, and was considered an authoritative textbook as late as the mid-2000s.

The 1977 excavation of the Longshan culture site of Wangchenggang at Dengfeng, Henan led Xia Nai to declare that the Xia dynasty, traditionally recognized as the first Chinese dynasty, was represented in the archaeological record by a distinct "Xia culture" and "Xia people". Zou echoed these theories. At a public meeting in Dengfeng that year, he presented his thesis identifying the Erlitou culture with the Xia dynasty and the Zhengzhou Shang City with Bo, a Shang capital city. This thesis was later incorporated into his 1980 book, Xia Shang Zhou Kaoguxue Lunwenji (Chinese: 夏商周考古学论文集, 'Collected Essays on the Xia, Shang, and Zhou Dynasties'). His presentation caused a great deal of debate among archaeologists on whether all stages of the Erlitou culture were Xia, and if the regional late Longshan culture of Henan was part of the early Xia. Zou identified all phases of the Erlitou as Xia. Xia Nai argued that each proposed chronology was problematic in its own right, but that study of Zou's identification of Zhengzhou Shang City with Bo should be pursued further.

=== Later archaeological career ===
From 1979 to 1994, Zou spent much of his time supervising excavations at the Zhou-era Tianma-Qucun site, in collaboration with the Institute of Archaeology of Shanxi Province. Located near Houma, the capital of Jin in the 6th and 5th centuries BCE, he theorized that Tianma-Qucun represented an earlier capital of the state, sparking academic dispute over the proper identification. In 1983, he was promoted to a full professorship. The same year, he was invited by Chinese-American sinologist Kwang-chih Chang to teach as a Yenching scholar at Harvard University. He stayed at Harvard for 8 months, and taught a seminar on Bronze Age China alongside Chang and Chinese University of Hong Kong professor Lin Shoujin. During the 1980s, he traveled abroad extensively, and frequently visited collections of early Chinese art in other countries.

The looting of archaeological sites by armed gangs spread rapidly across China during the late 1980s. Zou continued his work at Tianma-Qucun despite frequent death threats from looters, often working as the only official at the site. Looting activities continued despite government crackdowns; the nearby Jin royal cemetery at Beizhao was discovered and plundered in 1992, continuing during the subsequent official excavations. In 1989, Zou ceased field duties to focus on documenting artifacts recovered from Tianma-Qucun. His former student Li Boqian assumed leadership over operations at the site.

After completing the documentation and periodization of the Tianma-Qucun artifacts, Zou worked from 1994 to 1996 to compile the report for the excavations alongside junior researchers Liu Xu, Sun Hua, and Xu Tianjin. He spent most of his time at Peking University's Shang-Zhou archaeology office on the second floor of the Arthur M. Sackler Museum, sleeping on a cot in the office during the workweek. He was pressured into retirement by the university in 1996; four years later, the report was published by Science Press in a four-volume work entitled Tianma-Qucun 1980–89, then the largest archaeologist publication ever published in the People's Republic.

Zou was awarded the National Museum of Asian Art's Shimada Prize in 2001 for his work at Tianma-Qucun, but was unable to attend the award ceremony due to the September 11 attacks. In 2003, a large two-volume Festschrift was published in his honor. One article within the text, submitted under the name of his son Zou Xiaotian, was found to have been written by Zou Heng himself; the article aggressively criticized Li Boqian due to his work under the Xia–Shang–Zhou Chronology Project.

Zou was diagnosed with cancer in 2004. He published his last article in April 2005, a submission to the Huaxia Kagou criticizing the official interpretations of the Zhengzhou Shang City. His health entered a steep decline after attending a conference on the archaeological effects of the South–North Water Transfer Project that October. After an unsuccessful operation, he died in Beijing on December 27, 2005.

== Historiography ==
Zou wrote that his identification of the Xia dynasty with the Erlitou culture was made using the same methods previously employed by Wang Guowei to connect the list of Shang kings in the Shiji, a Han-era history, with those mentioned in the Oracle bone texts. Zou reasoned that since the Shiji accurately recounted the Shang lineage, it was unlikely to have fabricated the Xia dynasty.

Based on trends in pottery designs over time, he placed the Predynastic Shang in northern Henan and southern Hubei. This view is in contrast to another school of thought (including archaeologists such as Zhang Changshou and Kwang-chih Chang) which place the Shang's origins further east, centered around eastern Henan and the surrounding region. Also drawn from pottery similarities, Zou theorized in the Xia Shang Zhou Kaoguxue Lunwenji that the Predynastic Zhou originated as a group from the Guangshe culture of northern Shaanxi which settled in the Wei River valley. Although aligning with traditional accounts of their origins, this heavily contrasted with Ch'ien Mu's theory, first proposed in 1931, which placed the Zhou homeland in the Fen River valley of Shanxi. This sparked widespread academic debate between scholars from Shanxi and Shaanxi, both arguing for the Zhou's origins in their own province.

Like many Chinese archaeologists and historians, Zou was highly influenced by Marxist historiography, which was officially promoted by the Chinese government. American sinologist Robert Thorp criticized Zou's adherence to Marxist historiography, claiming it "permeates every aspect" of the Shang Zhou Kaogu. Yale anthropologist David W. Goodrich criticized Thorp's assessment of Zou, arguing that although he was forced to make some concessions to Marxist and Maoist conceptions of Chinese history, his underlying framework was compatible with western historiography and archaeology.
