= One-Corner =

Type of composition in traditional Chinese painting

"One-Corner" or "Ma's One-Corner" (Chinese traditional: 馬一角; Chinese simplified: 马一角）is a particular type of composition in traditional Chinese painting. It was popular in the Southern Song dynasty Imperial Academy Painting, and the painters pushed the actual subjects of the painting to one corner and set them against the empty background suggestive of mist or snow. One good example is "Watching the Deer by a Pine Shaded Stream" in the Cleveland Museum of Art collection by the Southern Song dynasty master Ma Yuan 马远, after whom the term was named. Translating the term as "One-corner Ma" and considering it the nickname of Ma Yuan is not necessarily what the term originally meant in ancient China. Together with Xia Gui 夏圭, who was famous for "One-side" composition, Ma Yuan was a leader of the Ma-Xia school of painting.

"Watching the Deer by a Pine Shaded Stream", an example of "One-Corner" composition, by Ma Yuan
