= Wai-kam Ho =

Chinese-American art historian (1924–2004)

- Born: March 26, 1924; Guangdong, Republic of China
- Died: December 28, 2004 (aged 80); Shanghai, People's Republic of China
- Occupation: Museum curator
- Spouse: Wai-ching Ho

Academic background
- Education: Lingnan University, Yenching University, Harvard University (M.A.)

Academic work
- Discipline: Chinese art history
- Institutions: Cleveland Museum of Art, Nelson-Atkins Museum

Wai-Kam Ho (26 March 1924 – 28 December 2004) was a Chinese-American art historian and curator. Born in Guangdong province, Ho studied history at Lingnan University and Yenching University before serving as a research assistant to Chen Yinke in 1949. Chen arranged for Ho to travel in secret to the United States, where he attended Harvard University, receiving an M.A. in 1953. He was hired as the curator of Oriental and Chinese art at the Cleveland Museum of Art in 1958, where he worked under director Sherman Lee. In 1983, he transferred to the Nelson-Atkins Museum of Art in Kansas City, Missouri. Ho and his wife Wai-ching organized the 1992 exhibition Century of Tung Ch'i-ch'ang, 1555-1636. He served as chief editor of the exhibition's catalogue, which received the first Shimada Prize in 1993. Alongside his curator duties, Ho worked as an adjunct professor at Case Western Reserve University and the University of Kansas.

== Biography ==
Wai-Kam Ho was born in Guangdong on 26 March 1924. He attended an undergraduate program at Lingnan University in Guangzhou, graduating in 1947. He transferred to the graduate history program at Yenching University in Beijing. Two years later, Ho returned to serve as a research assistant to Chen Yinke. Chen trained Ho in his specialty of Buddhist manuscripts and iconography.

In 1950, Chen arranged for Ho to travel to the United States in secret to study art history. Ho attended Harvard University, where he studied under Benjamin Rowland. He also studied Buddhist history under Kenneth K. S. Chen at the Harvard–Yenching Institute. In 1953, Ho received a master's degree in Chinese history and Asian art. He remained at Harvard in a doctoral program until 1958. That year, he was appointed as the curator of Oriental and Chinese art at the Cleveland Museum of Art, where he worked under director Sherman Lee.

=== Curation ===
Ho began publishing articles in the Bulletin of the Cleveland Museum of Art soon after joining the museum, generally writing on Buddhist artifacts. He frequently worked at home, greatly irritating Lee; in one instance, Lee placed a wanted poster of Ho in his office. Ho prolifically documented pieces in the museum's exhibition catalogues, collaborating with Lee for the 1968 exhibition Chinese Art under the Mongols and the 1980 Eight Dynasties of Chinese Painting. Ho identified a painting belonging to the 10th-century master Juran by matching an inventory seal to one used by the Song dynasty government. In addition to his work at the Museum, Ho worked as an adjunct professor at Case Western Reserve University from 1962 to 1983. In 1976, he served as a visiting professor at Harvard.

In 1983, after requesting a position from curator Marc Wilson, Ho was appointed the Laurence Sickman Curator of Chinese Art at the Nelson-Atkins Museum in Kansas City, Missouri. He began teaching at the University of Kansas the following year. He was an overseas fellow of the Institute of Chinese Culture at the Chinese University of Hong Kong in 1988. While at Nelson-Atkins, he organized the 1992 exhibition Century of Tung Ch'i-ch'ang, 1555-1636, dedicated to the late Ming artist Dong Qichang. Ho edited the extensive two-volume exhibition catalogue, which was awarded the Metropolitan Center for Far Eastern Art Studies and National Museum of Asian Art's first Shimada Prize in 1993. His wife, Wai-ching Ho, served as the exhibition's executive coordinator and editor of the proceedings.

Ho retired in 1994 and moved to Pittsburgh, although he continued to give talks at various symposiums. He fell gravely ill from the complications of diabetes while visiting Shanghai in November 2004, and died there on 28 December.
