= Walking on a Mountain Path in Spring =

Painting by Ma Yuan

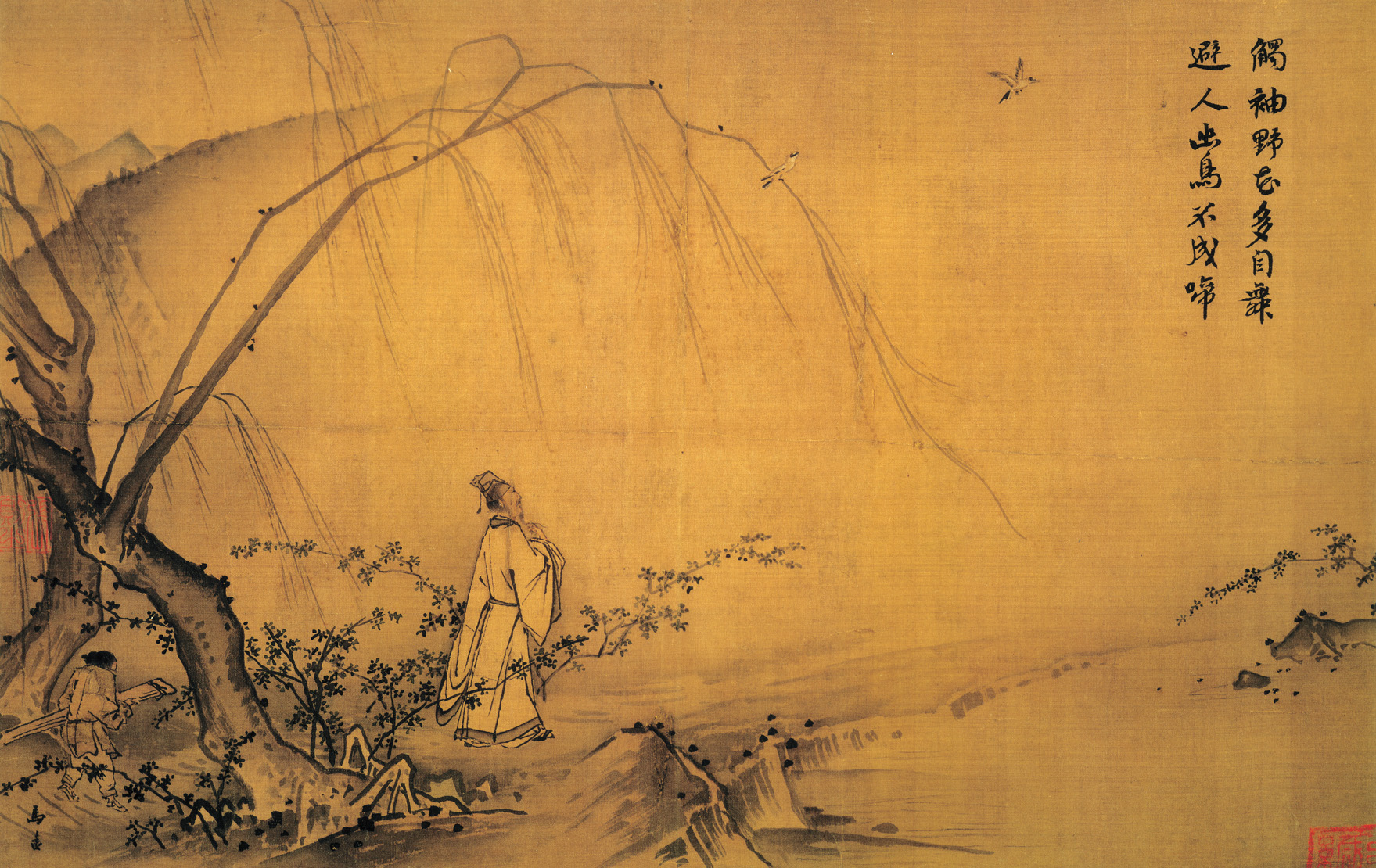
- Artist: Ma Yuan
- Year: Southern Song dynasty
- Type: ink on silk
- Dimensions: 27.4 cm × 43.1 cm (10.8 in × 17.0 in)
- Location: National Palace Museum, Taipei

Walking on a Mountain Path in Spring (Chinese: 山徑春行) is a painting by Chinese artist Ma Yuan (c. 1160-1225). It is painted on an album leaf, which also contains a poem attributed to Emperor Ningzong Of Song inscribed in the upper right corner.

The poem reads:

觸袖野花多自舞。避人幽鳥不成啼。

Wildflowers dance freely when touched by my sleeve. A secluded bird, avoiding people, cannot sing.

Mountain Path is done in Ma Yuan's One-Corner style, where most of the painting's imagery is in one corner.
