= Shimada Prize =

Art history prize

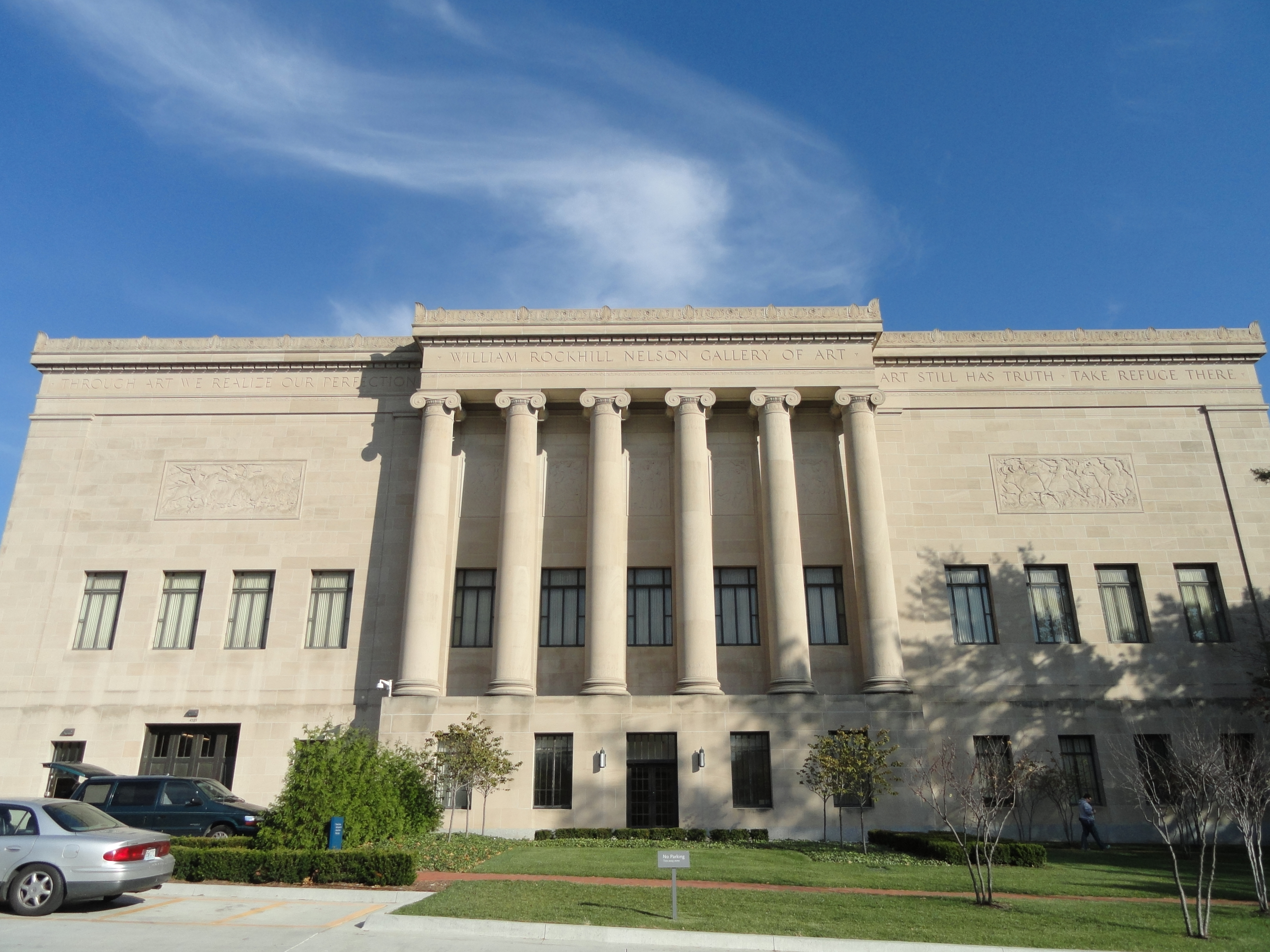
The Nelson-Atkins Museum of Art won the first Shimada Prize for its catalogue, The Century of Tung Ch’i-ch’ang (1555–1636)

The Shimada Prize was a biennial award bestowed jointly by the American National Museum of Asian Art and the Japanese Metropolitan Center for Far Eastern Art Studies for academic works in East Asian art history. It was established in honor of Japanese art historian Shūjirō Shimada in 1992, with the first prize bestowed in September 1993, shortly prior to Shimada's death the following year. The winner of the prize received a $10,000 award from the Metropolitan Center, funded by the Harry G. C. Packard Collections Charitable Trust. The prize has not been awarded since 2010.

== Recipients ==
Recipients of the Shimada Prize
Year	Portrait	Author(s)	Work
1993		Nelson-Atkins Museum of Art	The Century of Tung Ch’i-ch’ang (1555–1636)
1995		Hirata Yutaka	The Age of the Buddhist Master Painter
1997		Su Bai	中國石窟寺研究. [Studies on the Cave Temples of China]
1997		Li Xianting, Liang Ziming, Robert W. Bagley, Jay Xu	Art of the Houma Foundry
1999		Kihara Toshie	幽微の探究 : 狩野探幽論 [The Search for Profound Delicacy: The Art of Kano Tan’yu]
2001		Zou Heng	天马-曲村: 1980-1989 [Tianma-Qucun: 1980–89]
2003		Stanley K. Abe	Ordinary Images
2006		Andrew M. Watsky	Chikubushima: Deploying the Sacred Arts in Momoyama Japan
2008		Patricia Berger	Empire of Emptiness: Buddhist Art and Political Authority in Qing China
2010		Patricia Buckley Ebrey	Accumulating Culture: The Collections of Emperor Huizong
