= Ma Lin (painter) =

Chinese artist (1180–1256)

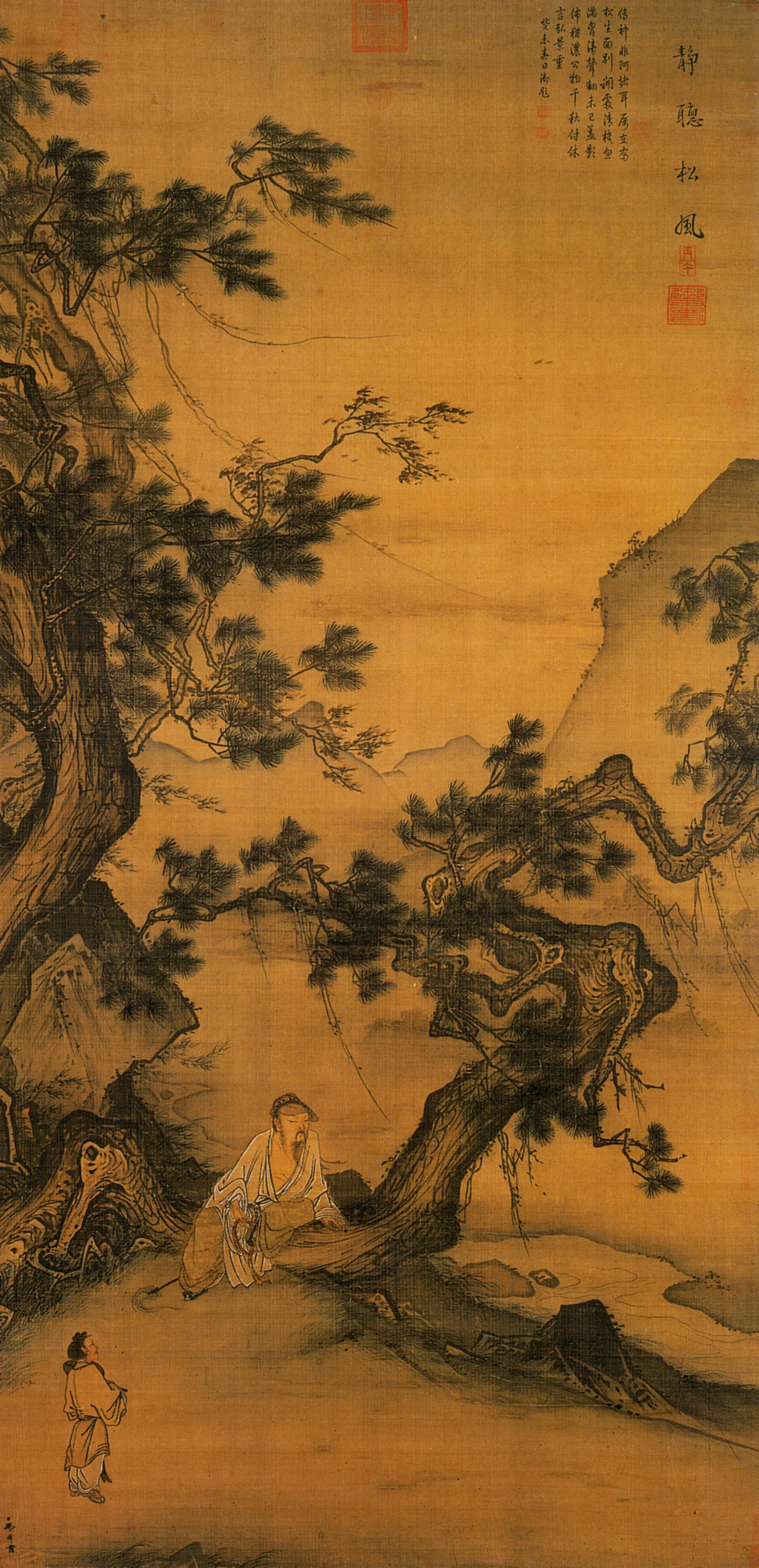
Ma Lin, Quietly Listening to Wind in the Pines 靜聽松風. Ink and color on silk. National Palace Museum, Taiwan.

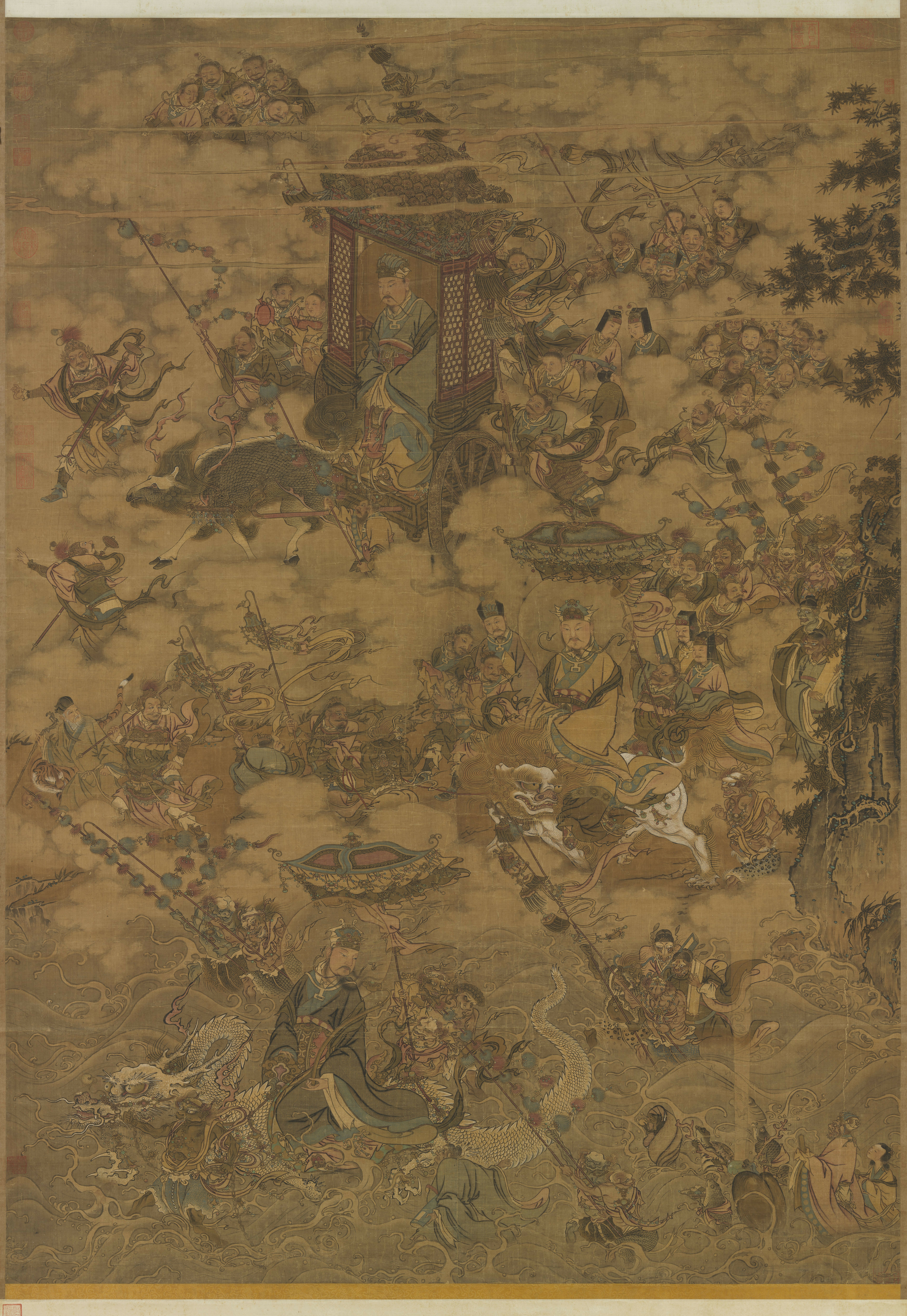
The Three Taoist Officials Making an Inspection Tour 三官出巡图轴, Ink and color on silk. National Palace Museum, Taiwan.

Ma Lin (simplified Chinese: 马麟; traditional Chinese: 馬麟; pinyin: Mǎ Lín; Wade–Giles: Ma Lin) (c. 1180 – after 1256) was a Chinese court painter during the Song dynasty active during the early to mid 13th century. He was the son of the famous Chinese painter Ma Yuan, from whom he learned the art of painting.

One of his best known paintings is Night Outing with Candles, which depicts a gentleman sitting in the doorway of a pavilion, facing four pairs of tall candles amongst flowering crab apple trees. It illustrates a poem by the famous (dissident poet and artist) Su Shi: "My fear is that in the depths of night, the flowers will fall asleep and depart, so I light the tall candles to illuminate their red beauty.". A full moon in the sky overhead confirms its nighttime setting.
