= Zhang Zhenglang =

Chinese historian (1912–2005)

- 張政烺
- Zhang, c. 1980s
- Born: 15 April 1912; Yatou, Rongcheng, Shandong, Republic of China
- Died: 29 January 2005 (aged 92)
- Occupation: Sinologist

Academic background
- Education: Peking University

Academic work
- Discipline: Paleographer, textual historian
- Institutions: Peking University, Zhonghua Book Company

Zhang Zhenglang (Chinese: 張政烺, 15 April 1912 – 29 January 2005) was a Chinese historian. Born in a small village in Rongcheng, Shandong, he attended school in Qingdao and Beijing before his acceptance at Peking University. He graduated from the university in 1936, and was appointed as a librarian at the Academia Sinica's Institute of History and Philology. He evacuated the institute's library following the outbreak of the Second Sino-Japanese War in 1937, transporting it through Hunan and Yunnan to Sichuan. He spent the remainder of the war writing articles on paleography and textual history, and was appointed to the rank of associate research fellow. He was offered a full professorship at Peking in 1946, and for a time simultaneously worked at Tsinghua. Despite attempts at support from the department's administrator, he was fired during the late 1950s Anti-Rightist Campaign, and worked for several years as an editor at the Zhonghua Book Company.

In 1966, he was appointed to a senior research fellowship, but was sent the same year to work as a pig farmer at a May Seventh Cadre School in rural Henan. Zhou Enlai's 1971 directives to produce a modern version of the Twenty-Four Histories allowed Zhang to return to work with Zhonghua, and he was assigned to edit the History of Jin. He published an influential article connecting the previously undeciphered numeral symbols on Zhou-era ritual bronzes to the hexagram forms used in the Mawangdui Silk Text copy of the I Ching divination following its discovery in the 1970s. Although he never published a book, a compilation of a hundred of his academic articles titled the Zhang Zhenglang Wenshi Lunji (張政浪文史論集) was compiled by former colleagues and students shortly before his death.

== Education ==
Zhang Zhenglang was born in the Yatou village of Rongcheng, Shandong on 15 April 1912. He was educated in a traditional manner at home, but left at 14 to attend the Lixian Middle School in Qingdao. As the middle school was a "semi-traditional" institution, he was forced to take two years of preparatory school in Beijing in order to qualify for university entrance examinations. In July 1932, he took the examinations of Fu Jen Catholic University in Beijing as a practice test, ultimately aiming to enroll in Tsinghua University's Mathematics Department. He was admitted to Fu Jen, but did not attend. Zhang also successfully passed the Peking University entrance examinations after a recent graduate of the school paid three yuan to cover the school's entrance fee.

While taking the exams of his preferred school, Tsinghua, he felt that a paper he had submitted during the Chinese literature examinations had incorrectly responded to the prompt, and left the testing early. He had in fact been one of three students to give the correct answer. However, he was unable to afford the tuition at the university, and instead accepted the offer of attendance at Peking. Although seeking to attend the university's Chinese department, he settled instead for History due to low scores on an English examination. While attending the school, he formed a historical academic society dubbed the Qian She. He published two papers in the society's two-issue journal, Shixue Luncong (石學論叢). During his final year at the university, he wrote a lengthy letter to Hu Shih, arguing that the 16th-century novel Investiture of the Gods was initially written by a Daoist priest named Lu Xixing (陸西星). Impressed by Zhang's research, Hu wrote back favorably, and the letter was published in the Duli Pinglun (獨立評論) journal.

== Academic career ==
Zhang graduated from the university's history department in 1936. That same year, he was recruited to the Academia Sinica's Institute of History and Philology by his former professor Fu Ssu-nien and became a librarian at the institute's campus in Nanjing. Fu tasked him to acquire new books for the library, with the stipulation that no duplicate books could be purchased. This requirement included differing titles for the same book, prompting Zhang to survey much of the library, consisting of around 120,000 Chinese books and around 10,000 western imports.

=== Wartime ===
The outbreak of the Second Sino-Japanese War prompted the evacuation of the institute to Changsha, Hunan, in the autumn of 1937. Although the institution later moved operations to Longquan in Kunming, Yunnan, to avoid Japanese air raids, the library remained in Hunan for some time. Zhang was tasked In 1940 to transport the books further inland in preparation for the relocation of the institute to Sichuan. The library was transported by rented boats along the Xiang and Yangtze rivers to Hankou, before another trip upriver to Yichang. Following a significant delay in acquiring new boats, the library reached Chongqing in March 1938, and were stored in Shapingba. In 1940, they were moved alongside the relocated institute to Lizhuang in Nanxi County, Sichuan.

Zhang was able to successfully transport the library without any loss of books. While at Lizhuang, he published several articles in the Zhongyang-Yanjiuyuan-Lishi-Yuyan-Yanjiusuo-Jikan (中央研究院历史语言研究所季刊) and Zeshan (責善) journals, with a focus on paleography and textual history. During this time, he was promoted to an associate research fellow.

=== Postwar period and persecution ===
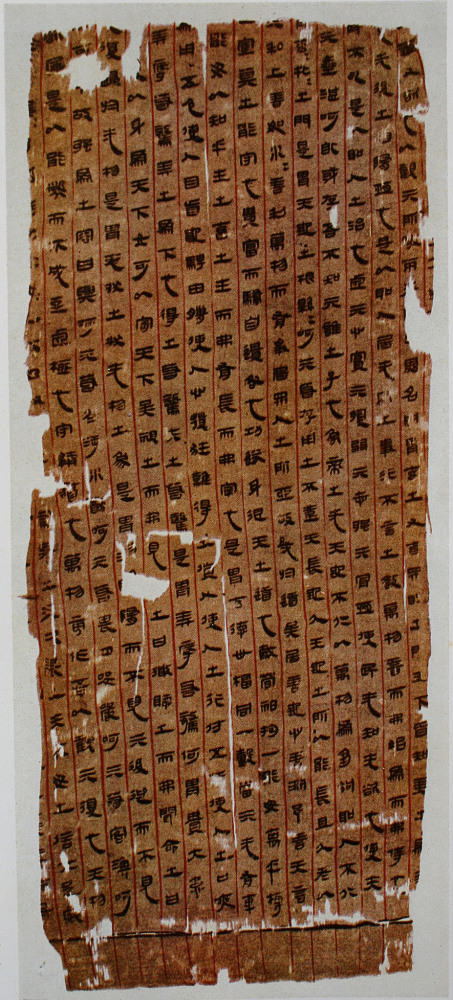
One of the Mawangdui Silk Texts, discovered in 1973

After the war, the institute returned to Nanjing. Various universities were understaffed following the war and attempted to fill academic positions. Tsinghua offered a full professorship to Zhang, and this was soon matched by an offer from Fu Ssu-nien, now the acting director of Peking University. Zhang accepted Fu's offer and became one of the youngest full professors at Peking. For a period of time, he also simultaneously worked in paleography at Tsinghua University. During his time at Peking, Zhang wrote a number of journal articles on vernacular literature and the Dunhuang manuscripts, as well as an influential analysis of Song Jiang. He was promoted to the rank of researcher (Chinese: 研究員; pinyin: yánjiūyuán). Although inspired by the Marxist historian Guo Moruo, Zhang was relatively uninterested in politics, and continued friendly relations with his former colleagues at the Academia Sinica who had evacuated to Taiwan. In 1954, he became a co-founder and board member of the Institute of History of the Chinese Academy of Social Sciences (CASS).

Although officially following the Communist Party line in regards to historiographical questions, Zhang privately differed in some respects. He disagreed with the idea that feudalism originated during the Warring States period (475–221 BCE), instead believing it emerged during the Cao Wei and Jin dynasties (220–420 CE). Zhang was part of a large number of academics harassed and persecuted during the Anti-Rightist Campaign in the late 1950s. In 1960, Zhang was fired by a group of junior administrations while department head Jian Bozan was on an international trip. Jian was greatly angered by this decision, but was unable to restore Zhang to his position at the university. After leaving Peking, Zhang worked as the vice-general-editor for the Zhonghua Book Company, concurrently with a research fellowship.

In 1966, Zhang was promoted to a senior research fellowship by Yin Da (尹達), a close colleague who served as acting director of the CASS's Institute of History. The same year, the outbreak of the Cultural Revolution led to Zhang's assignment to a May Seventh Cadre School in rural Henan, where he worked as a pig farmer as part of a mass political re-education campaign. Various historians were recalled from these rural programs in 1971, after Premier Zhou Enlai ordered the Zhonghua Book Company to continue a stalled project to publish modern versions of the official dynastic histories. Zhang was assigned to the History of Jin, but also advised many other scholars due to his textual experience.

=== I Ching studies ===
From 1974 to 1978, Zhang participated in the analysis of the newly discovered Yinqueshan Han Slips, Shuihudi Qin Bamboo Texts, and Mawangdui Silk Texts. Zhang published dozens of articles about these texts, including an influential series on the I Ching.

In 1979, he attended the first meeting of the Chinese Paleography Society in Changchun. After encountering photographs of oracle bone script Zhouyuan site, he noted similarities between some undeciphered characters and the hexagrams encountered in the Mawangdui I Ching. In his hotel room at the conference, he wrote a draft of a paper titled Shi Shi Zhou Chu Qingtong Qi Mingwen Zhong De Yi Gua (釋周初青銅器銘文中的易卦; 'An Interpretation of the Divinatory Inscriptions on Early Chou Bronzes'), which was published the following year. This was later translated into English for the journal Early China. Zhang's study became among the most influential studies on the evolution of I Ching divination, and became the foundational text within the field of "Yiology" (yixue).

== Later life and death ==
Zhang suffered a long period of illness during the late 1990s, and gradually lost his memory. One of his last calligraphy works was published in the newsletter Zhongguo Shehui kexueyuan tongxun (中国社会科学院通讯) on New Year 1997 to celebrate the Year of the Ox. He never published a book, but shortly before his death a group of his former students and colleagues compiled and published a collection of 100 of his articles. This was entitled Zhang Zhenglang Wenshi Lunji (張政浪文史論集). On 29 January 2005, Zhang died. He was buried at Futian Cemetery to the west of Beijing, incidentally adjacent to the plot of revolutionary Jiang Qing.
