= Xia Gui =

Chinese painter (1195–1224)

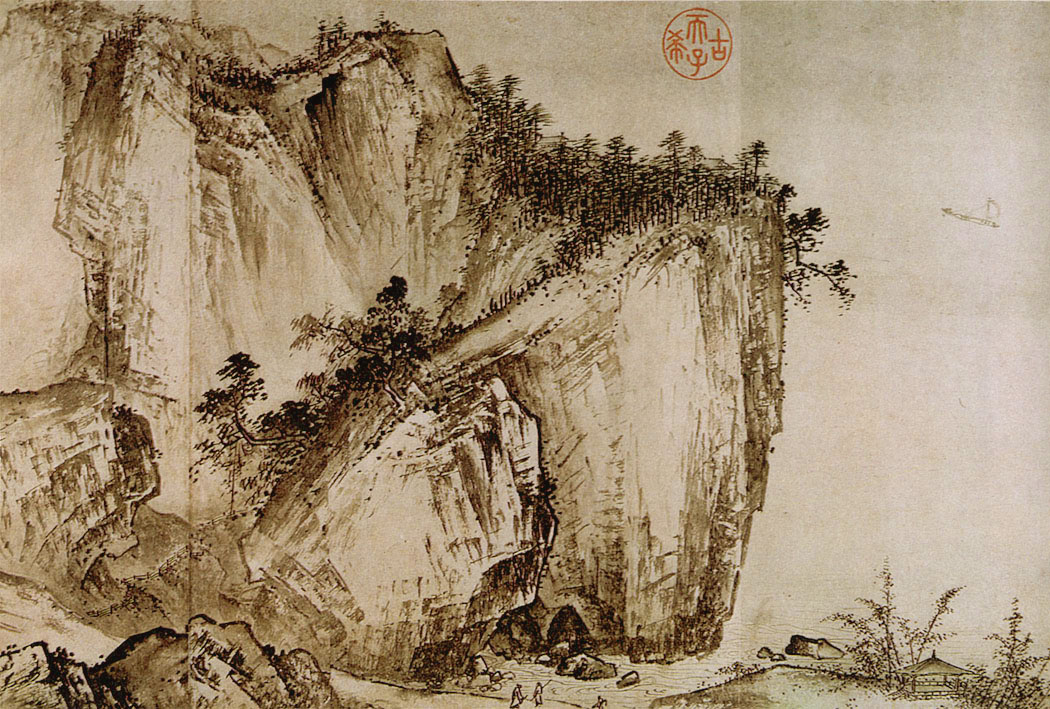
- Detail from the hand scroll Pure and Remote View of Streams and Mountains, one of Xia Gui's most important works
- Born: fl. 1195
- Died: 1224
- Known for: Painting
- Movement: Southern Song Dynasty, Ma-Xia School

Xia Gui (Chinese: 夏珪; Wade–Giles: Hsia Kui; fl. 1195–1224), courtesy name Yuyu (禹玉), was a Chinese landscape painter of the Song dynasty. Very little is known about his life, and only a few of his works survive, but he is generally considered one of China's greatest artists. He continued the tradition of Li Tang, further simplifying the earlier Song style to achieve a more immediate, striking effect. Together with Ma Yuan, he founded the so-called Ma-Xia (馬夏) school, one of the most important of the period.

Although Xia was popular during his lifetime, his reputation suffered after his death, together with that of all Southern Song academy painters. Nevertheless, a few artists, including the Japanese master Sesshū, continued Xia's tradition for hundreds of years, until the early 17th century.

== Life ==
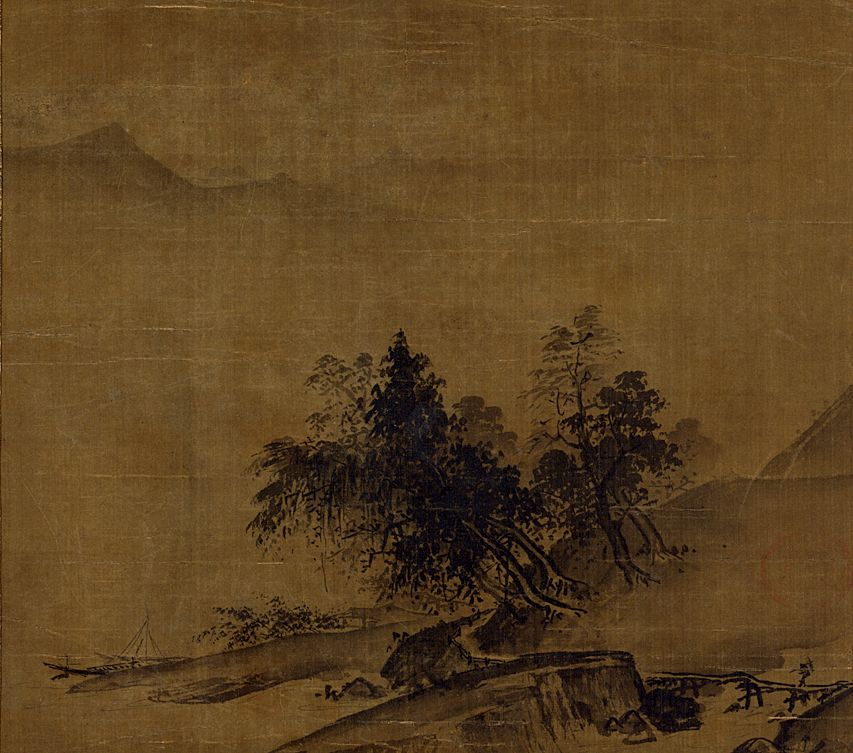
An untitled album leaf by Xia Gui, from the collection of Tokyo National Museum

No information survives on Xia's birth and death dates, background, or education. He was most probably born in Hangzhou, then capital of Southern Song. During the reign of Emperor Ningzong Xia served in the Imperial Painting Academy (Yuhuayuan 廷畫院) in the same city, the way most major artists did at the time. His teachers are unknown, but the surviving works suggest strong influence of Li Tang, a prominent academy painter whose style was a prominent influence on virtually all 12th-century Chinese landscape painters. Xia Gui and his contemporary, Ma Yuan, were among the most influential painters of their time; they had numerous followers who are now referred to as belonging to the Ma-Xia school.

Academy art of the Southern Song was not so appreciated during later periods, i.e. during the later 16th century and afterwards; hence Xia's popularity declined. However, a few critics felt that his paintings were among the better works of the Song Dynasty, and some Chinese artists were still producing works inspired by Xia's idiom. Sesshū Tōyō visited China in the 15th century and was influenced by works and followers of Xia Gui. Sesshū Tōyō made himself fen-pen (draft copy/study copy of the old masterpieces) of Hua Kei landscape fans with Sesshū Tōyō's signature. Two of them survived in Japan. Sesshū's numerous followers, the so-called Unkoku-rin School, sometimes imitated the style their teacher adopted from Xia.

== Work ==
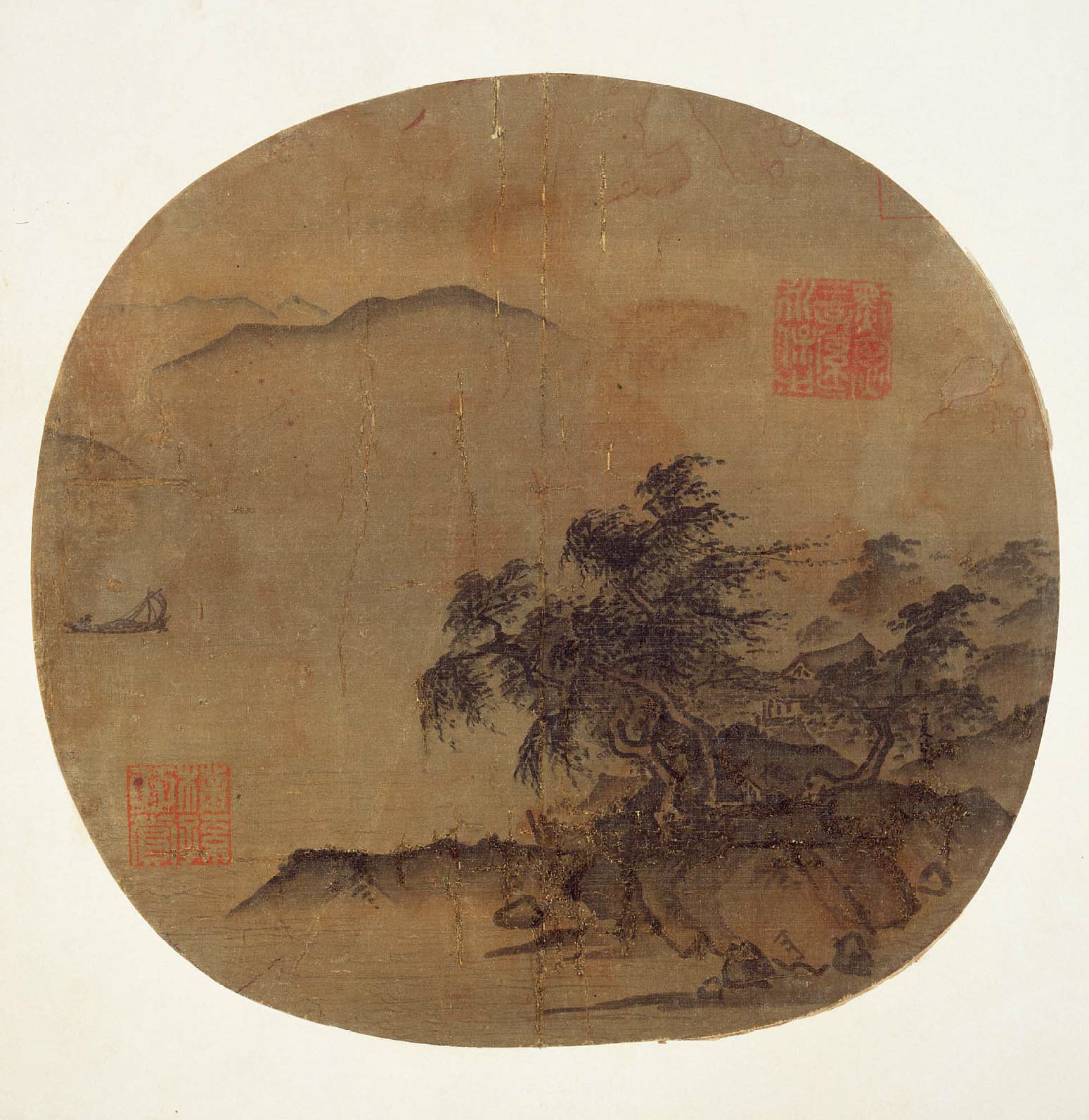
Xia Gui - Sailboat in Rainstorm. Boston

The vast majority of Xia's surviving works are small album leaves, the favorite genre of Song academy painters. The genuine work all scholars in the Proceeding 1970 agreed is the album leaf, Sailboat in Rainstorm, in the Museum of Fine Arts, Boston. Instead of producing highly detailed, complex paintings, he limited his materials and thus achieved a more immediate effect. Li Tang had numerous followers, and Xia was one of them; however, as his works show, he soon developed a personal style. Examples of his work in the album leaf format include two ink on silk paintings in the Tokyo National Museum (one of which is from the famous Garden Plowed by the Brush (Hikkoen) collection): both feature perfectly balanced diagonal composition, in which the void and the solid mass play equally important roles, and a formidable ink technique. Xia's techniques are even more impressive in his hand scrolls; however, few of these have survived. The most well known is the 9 meter (30 feet) long Pure and Remote View of Streams and Mountains (ink on paper). This work is preserved incomplete, missing a final section which bore the artist's signature. Extremely subtle, graded ink washes and overlapping brushstrokes created complex atmospheric effects of mist, sky, and infinity.

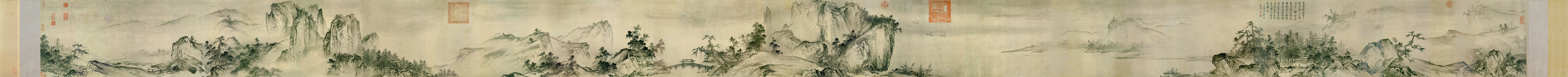
Pure and Remote View of Streams and Mountains. The full scroll measures 46.5 × 889.1 centimeters (18.309 × 350.04 inches) and is on display in the National Palace Museum, Taipei, Taiwan.

Other hand scrolls by Xia Gui include Ten Thousand Miles of the Yangzi River, which only survives in an unreliable 16th century copy, and Twelve Views from a Thatched Hut. The latter survives in several copies; the original is probably the fragmentary scroll in the Nelson-Atkins Museum of Art in Kansas City, Missouri, United States.

Hanging scrolls by Xia Gui are rare. the famous Rain Storm from the Kawasaki collection in Japan is now considered a copy. There are two possibly authentic hanging scrolls kept in the Freer Gallery of Art: Rapids in a Mountain Valley (also known as A Misty Gorge, survives without the top part which bore the signature) and Autumn Moonlight on Dongting Lake.

Old documents describe Xia as a painter who worked very fast, and with great ease. Pure and Remote View of Streams and Mountains is a work on paper, which absorbs ink quickly, and so must be an example of such spontaneous creation. Xia was also praised for his technical skill in drawing architecture and similar objects freehand, rather than using a ruler. Some sources mention the painter's preference for brushes with worn tips, used to avoid excessive smoothness, and "split" brushes, which allowed making two or more strokes at the same time.

== See also ==
- Culture of the Song dynasty
- Chinese painting
- Chinese art
- History of Chinese art

== Bibliography ==
- Cahill, James. (1985) Chinese Painting (1960, reissued 1985). Phoenix: Phoenix Art Museum. pp. 79–87.
- Lee, Sherman E. (1963) "Xia Gui." in The Encyclopedia of World Art, vol. 7. New York: McGraw-Hill. col. 650–654.
- Loehr, Max (1980). The Great Painters of China. Oxford: Phaidon Press. pp. 207–211. ISBN 0-7148-2008-3.
- Siren, Osvald. (1974) Chinese Painting: Leading Masters and Principles, vol. 2 (1956, reissued 1974). New York: Hacker Art Books. pp. 119–124.
- The discussion in Proceedings of the International Symposium on Chinese Painting Taipei 18–24 June 1970, Taipei, Taiwan, 443-463p, Edited by Nelson Wu and Richard Barnhart and Wai-Kam Ho and Others
