= Ma Yuan (painter) =

Chinese painter

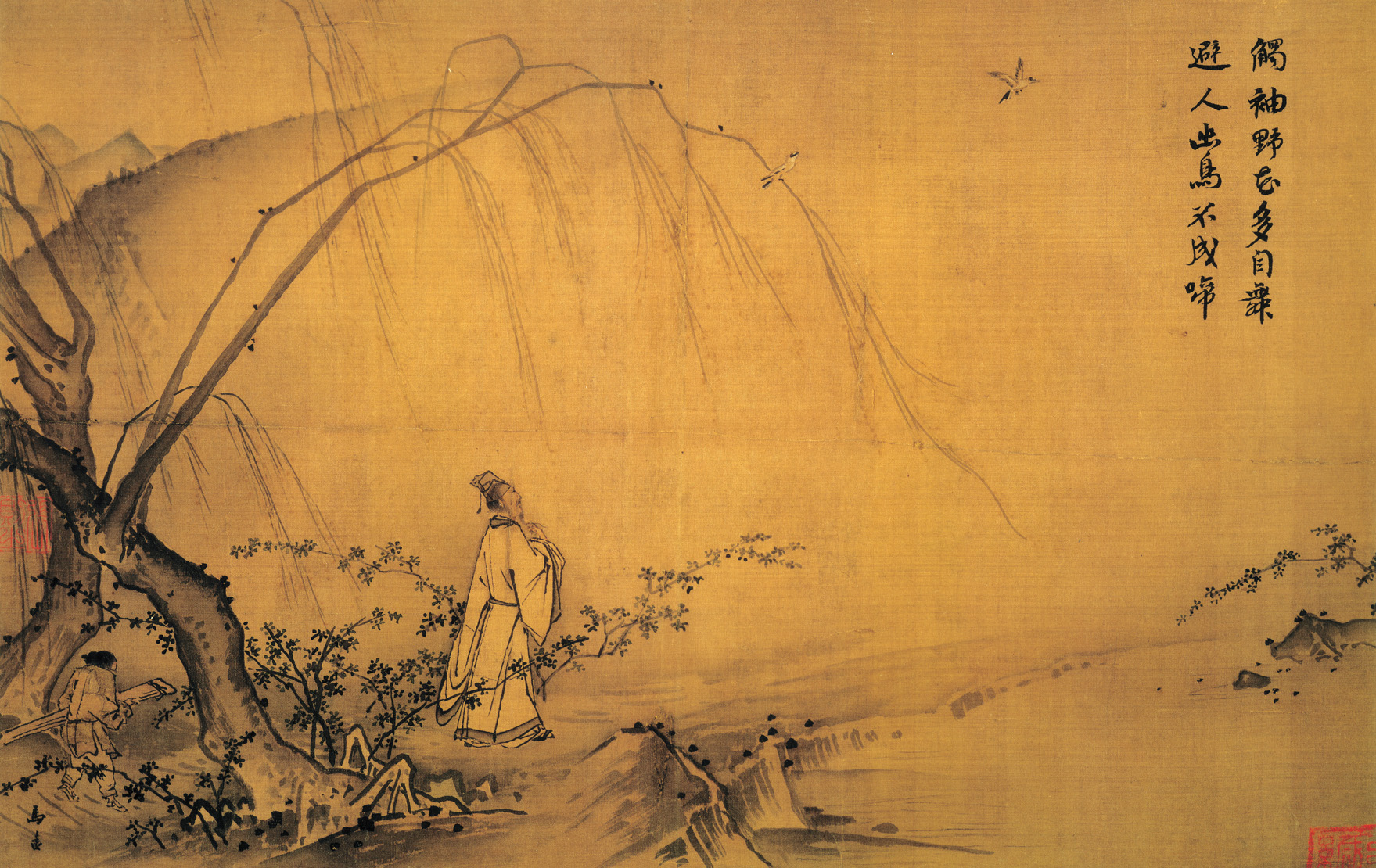
- Walking on a Mountain Path in Spring
- Born: c. 1160; Qiantang (now Hangzhou, Zhejiang)
- Died: 1225
- Known for: Painting
- Notable work: Dancing and singing Walking on a mountain path in spring
- Movement: Southern Song dynasty, Ma-Xia movement

Ma Yuan (Chinese: 馬遠; pinyin: Mǎ Yuǎn; Wade–Giles: Ma Yüan; c. 1160–65 – 1225) was a Chinese painter of the Song dynasty. His works, together with that of Xia Gui, formed the basis of the so-called Ma-Xia (馬夏) school of painting, and are considered among the finest from the period. His works has inspired both Chinese artists of the Zhe school, as well as the early Japanese painters Shūbun and Sesshū.

== Biography ==
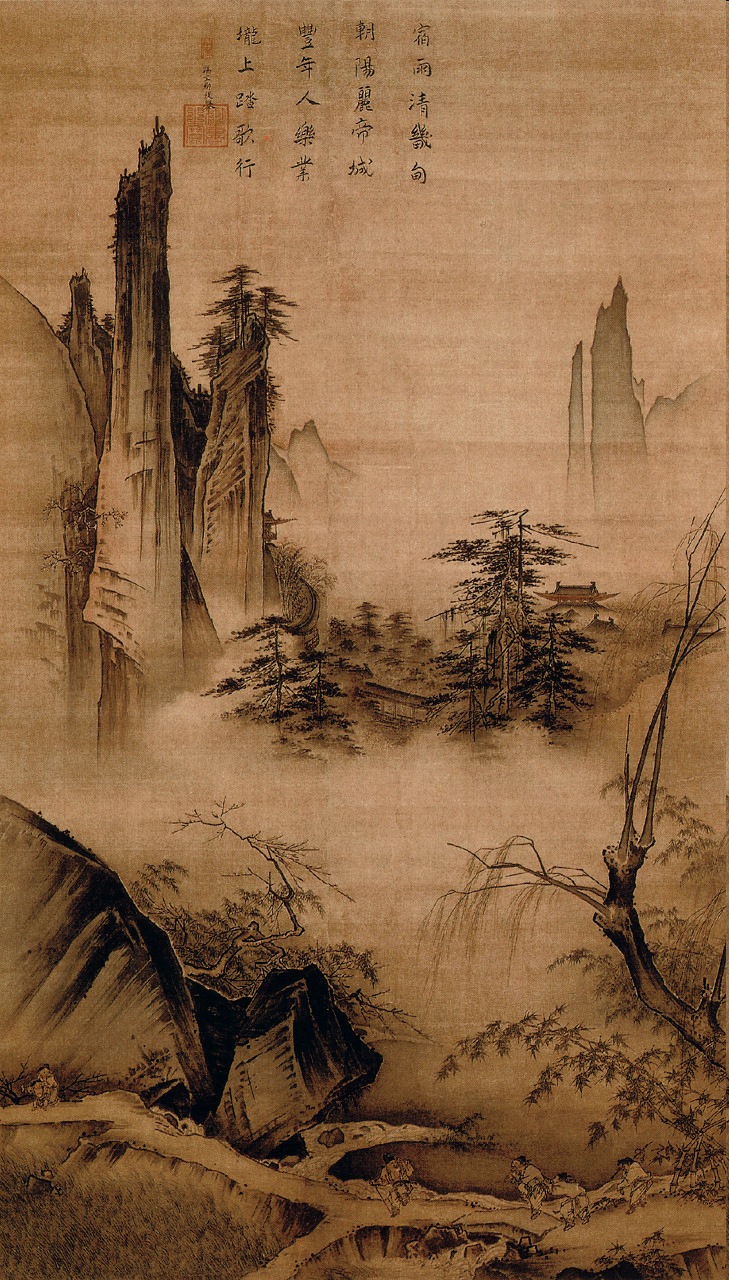
Dancing and Singing (Peasants Returning from Work)

Ma Yuan was born in Qiantang (now Hangzhou, Zhejiang) into a family of painters. His great-grandfather Ma Fen served as painter in attendance at the Northern Song court in early 12th century, and both his grandfather Ma Xingzu and his father Ma Shirong held the same position at the Southern Song court in Hangzhou. At some point after 1189, Ma Yuan received the same position under Emperor Guangzong. He evidently enjoyed a high reputation at the court and was a favorite of Emperor Ningzong (who wrote several poems inspired by Ma Yuan's paintings); but nothing more is known about his life. He died in 1225. His son, Ma Lin, who rose to the rank of painter-in-waiting, was the last painter in the family.

=== Works ===
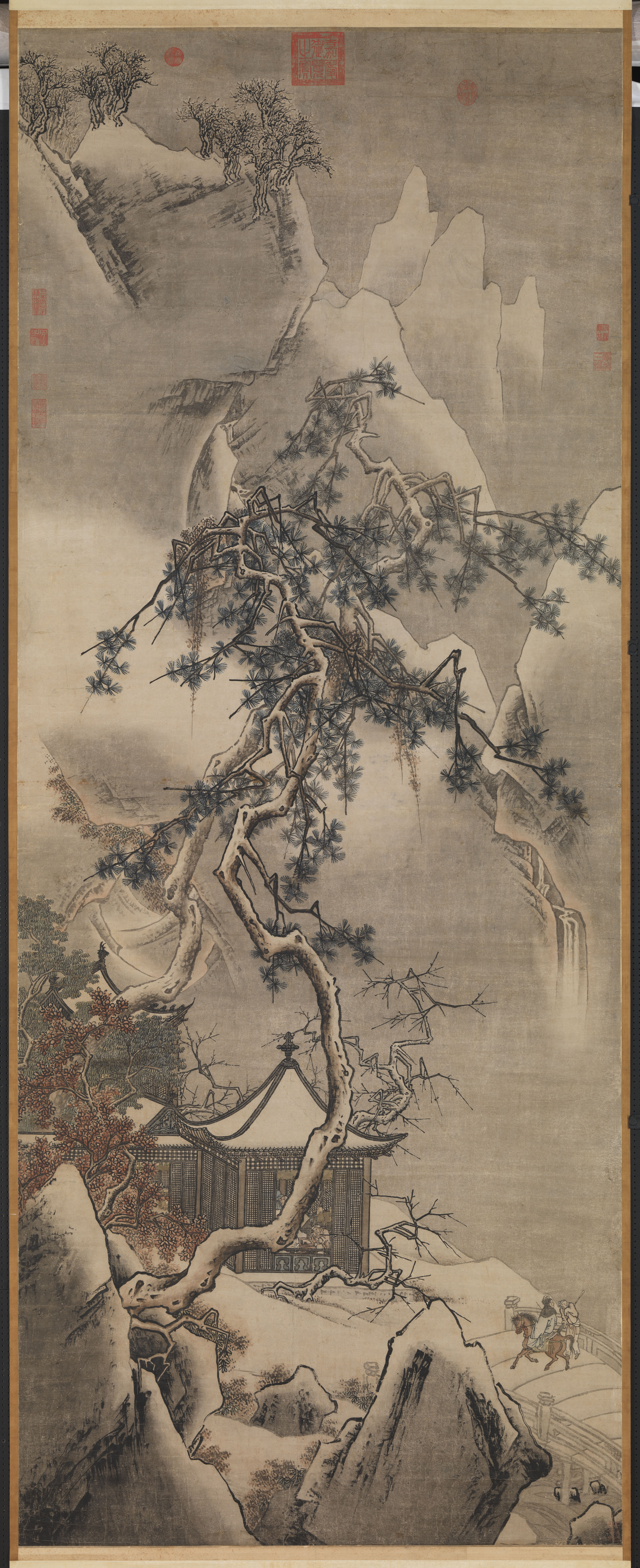
Snowscape

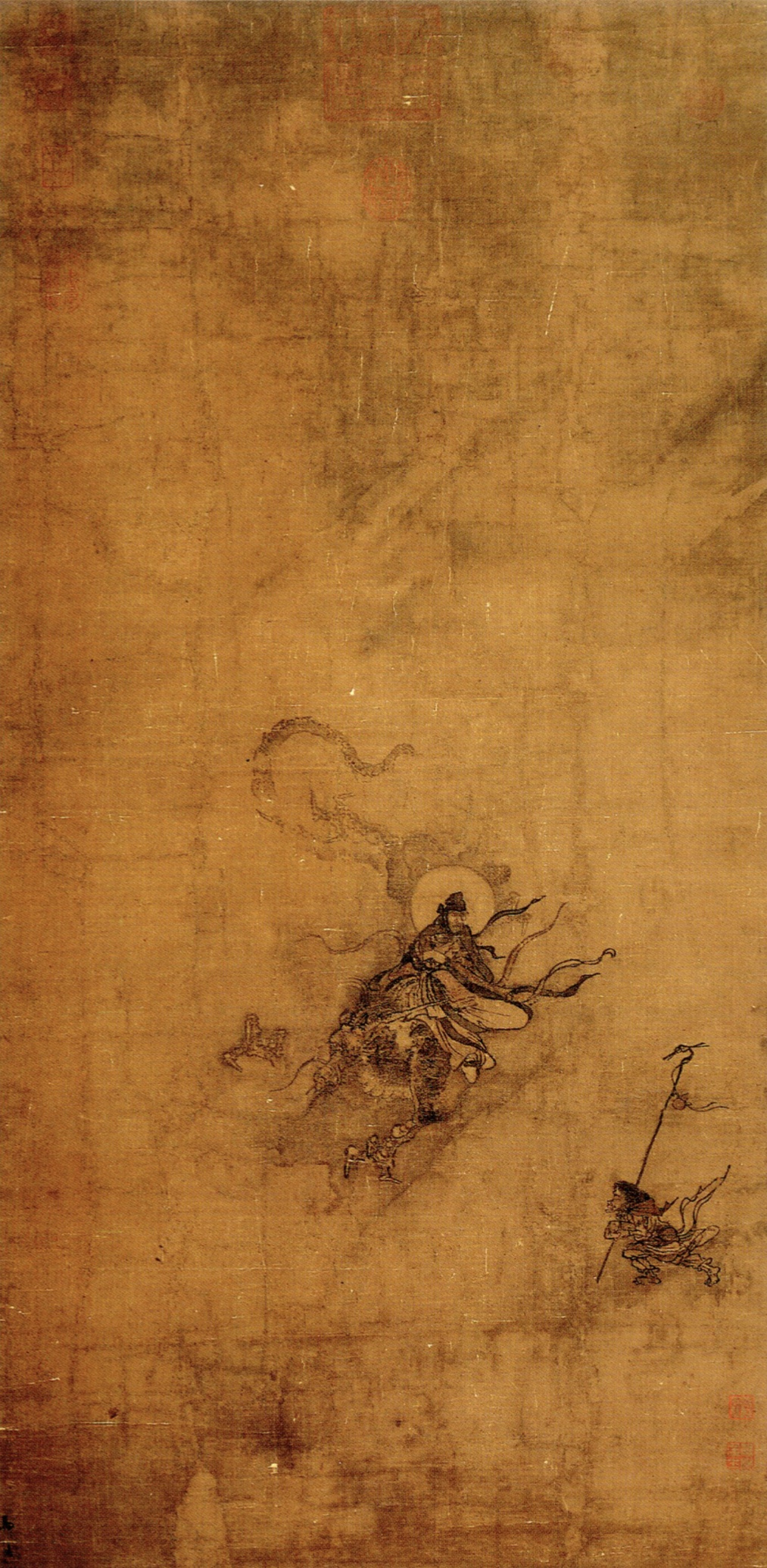
Immortal Riding a Dragon. Southern Song dynasty, early 13th century. Hanging scroll; ink and light colors on silk.

Although a very versatile painter, Ma is known today primarily for his landscape scrolls. His technique, like that of many contemporaries, was at first inspired by Li Tang. Eventually Ma developed a personal style, with marked decorative elements ("pine trees [...] strong as if they were made of iron wire", as described in a contemporary source). A characteristic feature of many paintings is the so-called "one-corner" composition, in which the actual subjects of the painting are pushed to a corner or a side, leaving the other part of the painting more or less empty.

Aside from landscapes, Ma's surviving oeuvre includes many different types of works. These include a number of delicate flower paintings (National Palace Museum, Taipei), a series of paintings of water and mountains (Palace Museum, Beijing), some paintings of Zen masters (two kept in Tenryū-ji, Kyoto), etc. Many album leaves survive that can attributed to Ma Yuan, but his authorship is disputed for all but a few of them, since Ma's popularity in his day led to numerous painters imitating his style. Walking on a Mountain Path in Spring (National Palace Museum) is among the album leaves with secure attribution, as are two leaves in the collection of Museum of Fine Arts, Boston, and one in Mr. and Mrs. Dean Perry Collection, Cleveland, Ohio. A group of hand scrolls survives as well, including one of the most important works, The Four Sages of Shangshan, in the collection of the Cincinnati Art Museum in Ohio. In the history of science and technology in China, Ma Yuan is remembered as being the first to depict a fishing reel in artwork (i.e. in his painting Angler on a Wintry Lake).

== Gallery ==
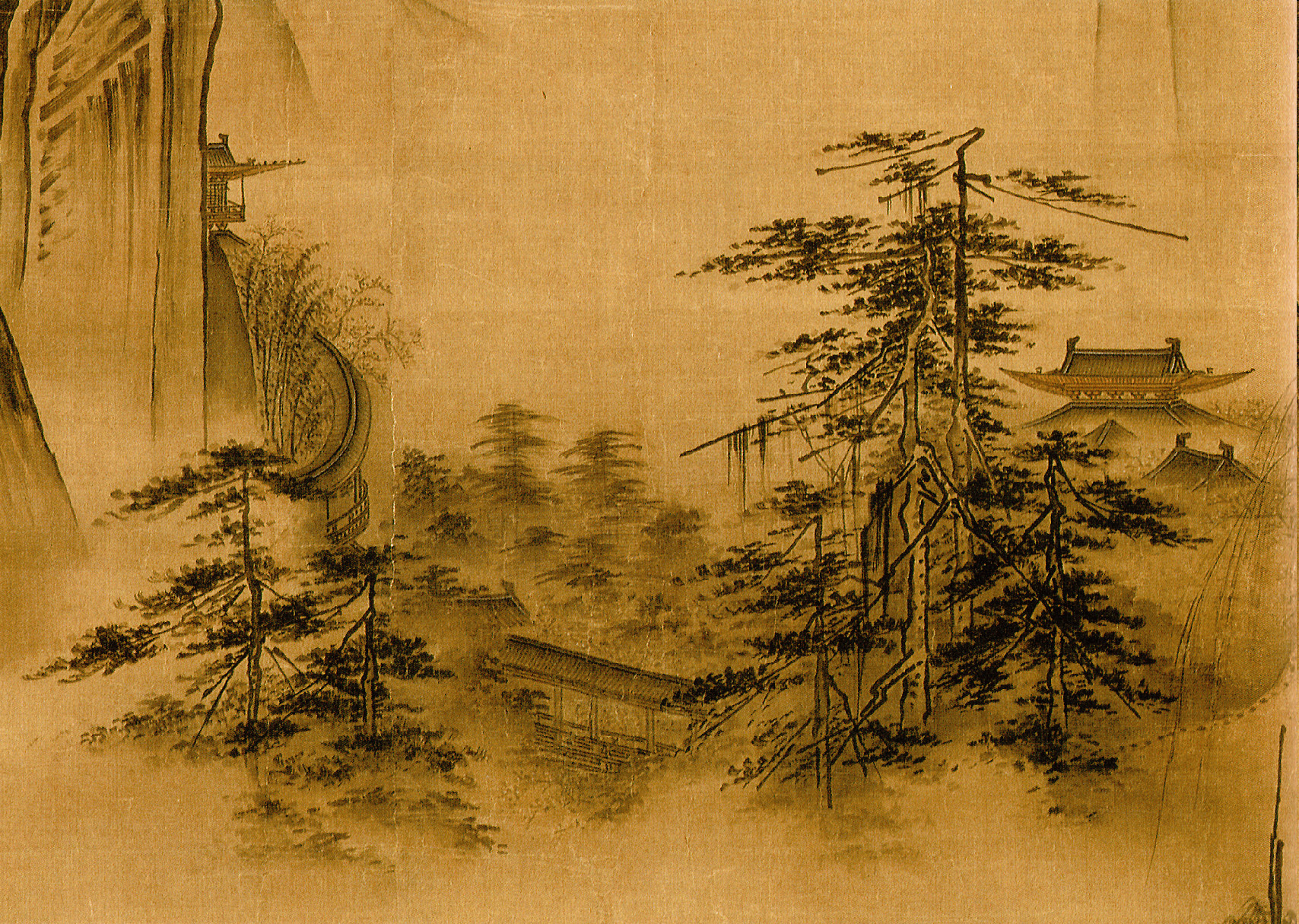

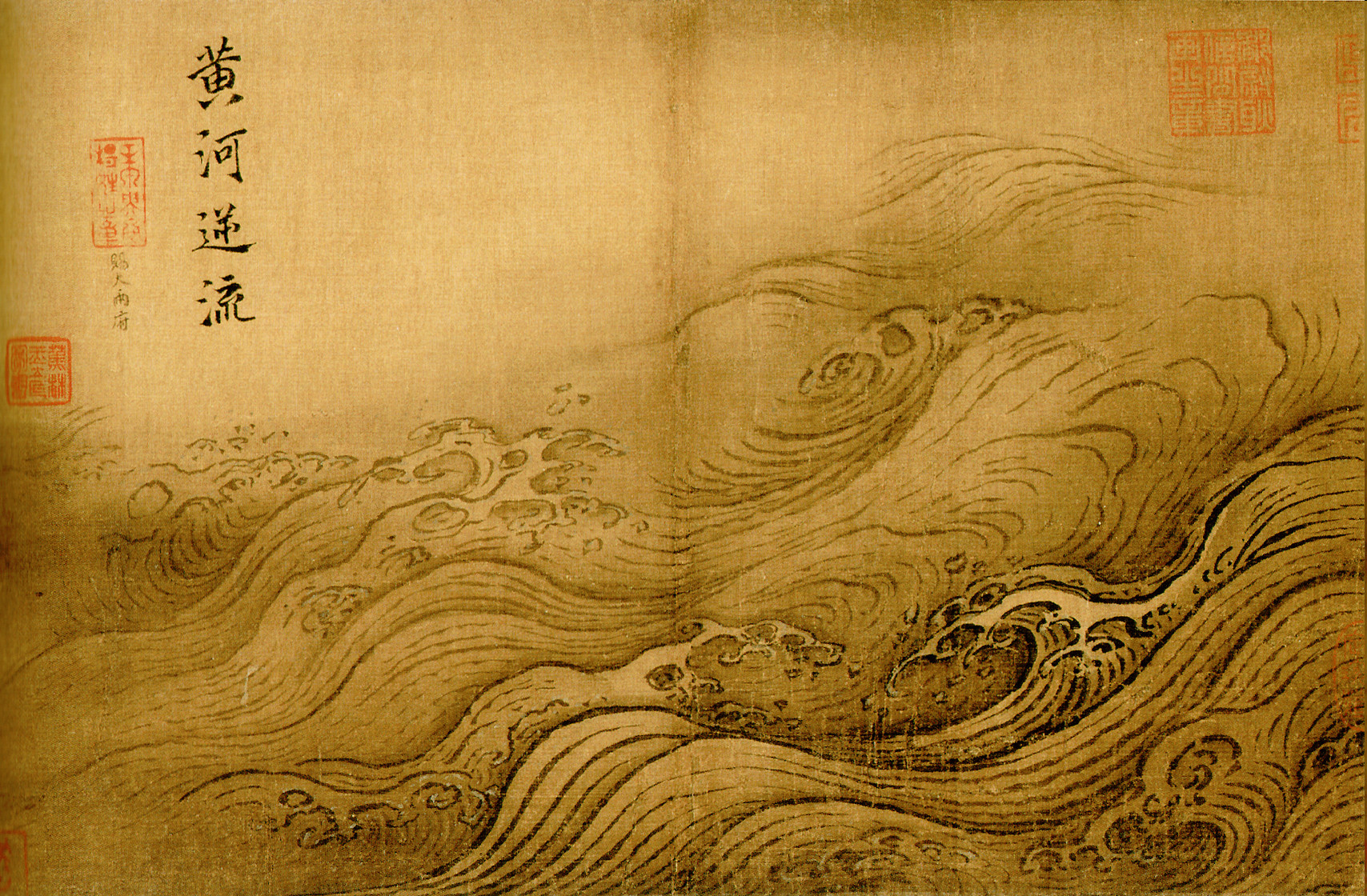

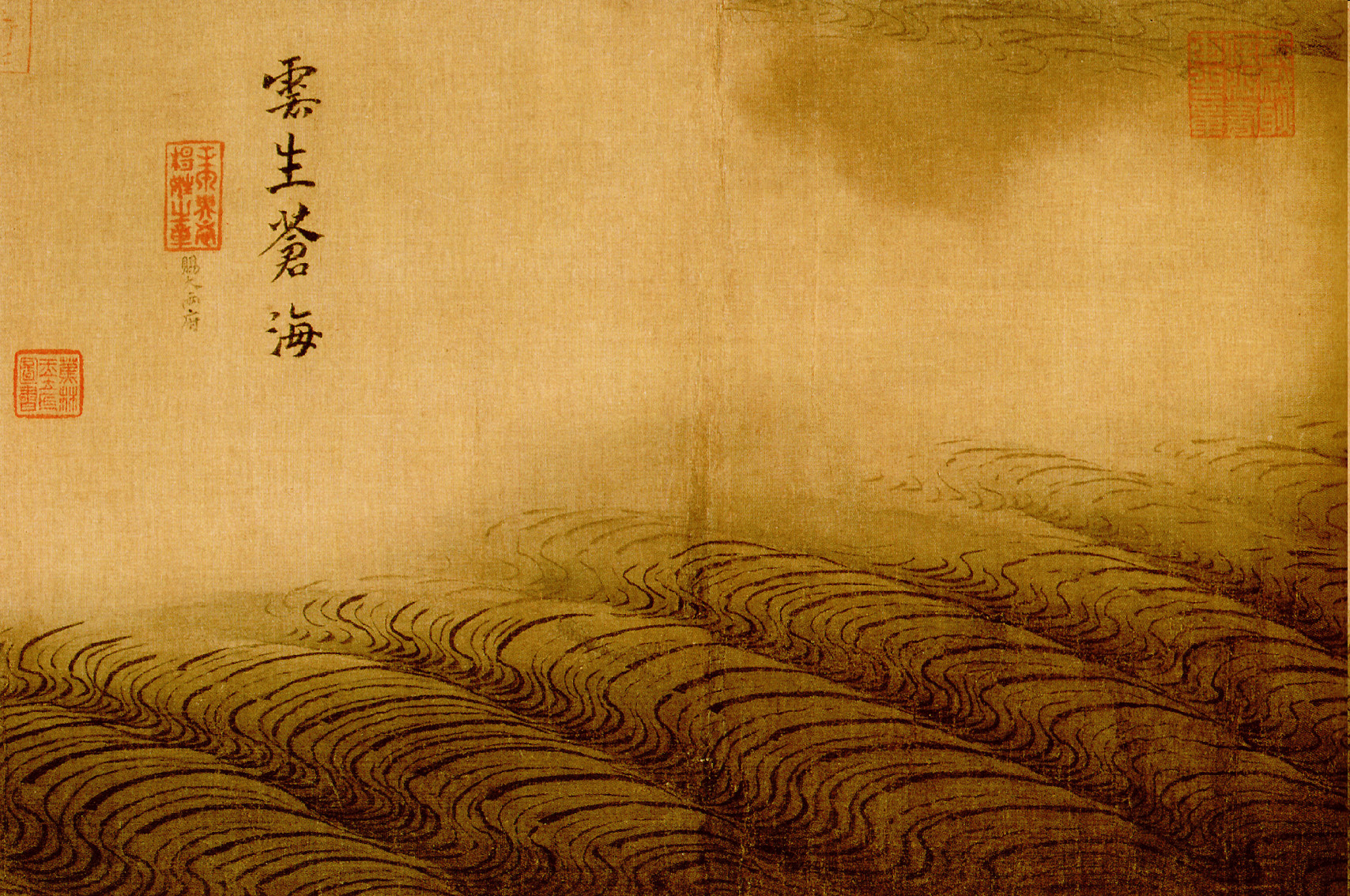

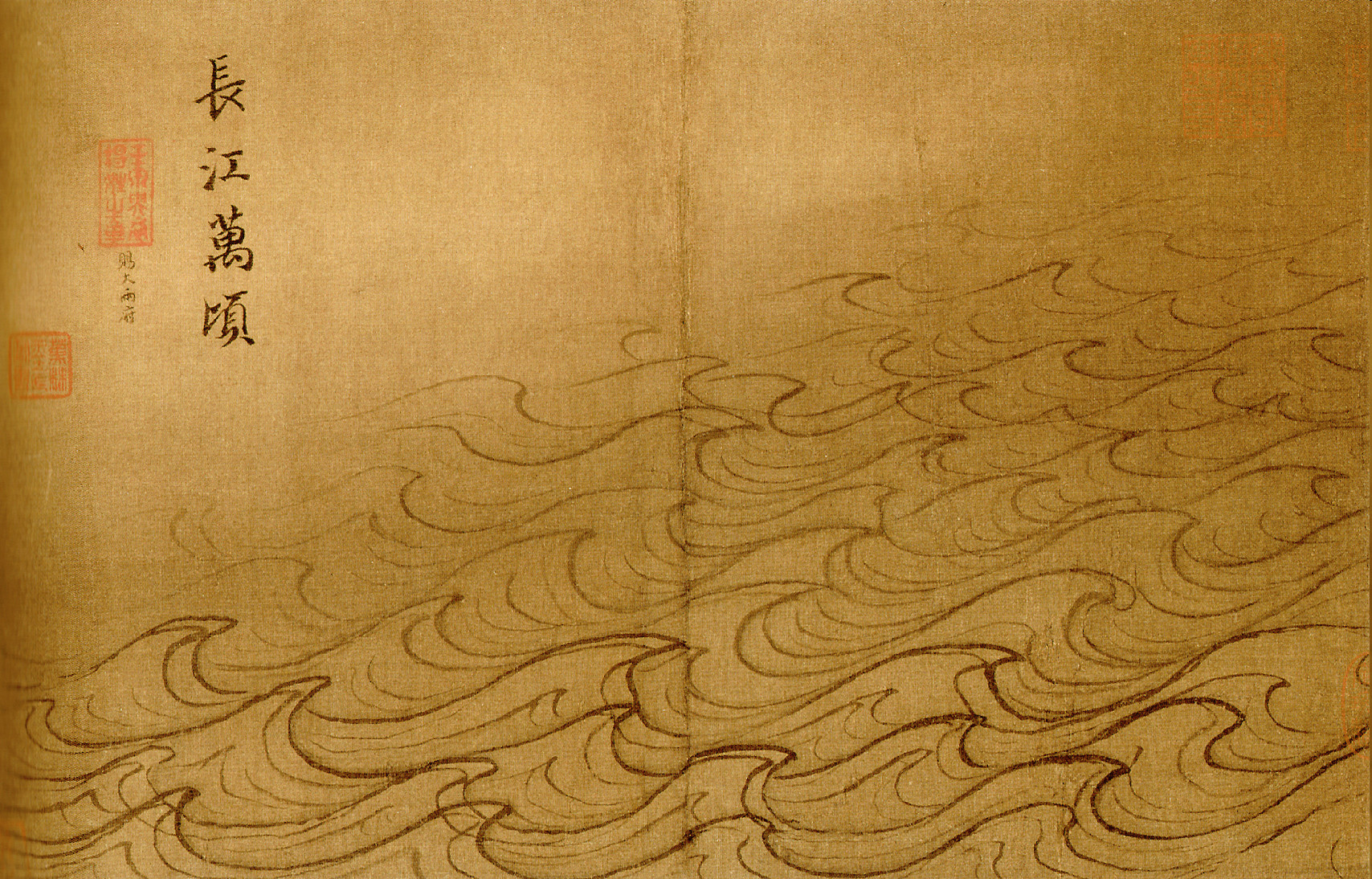

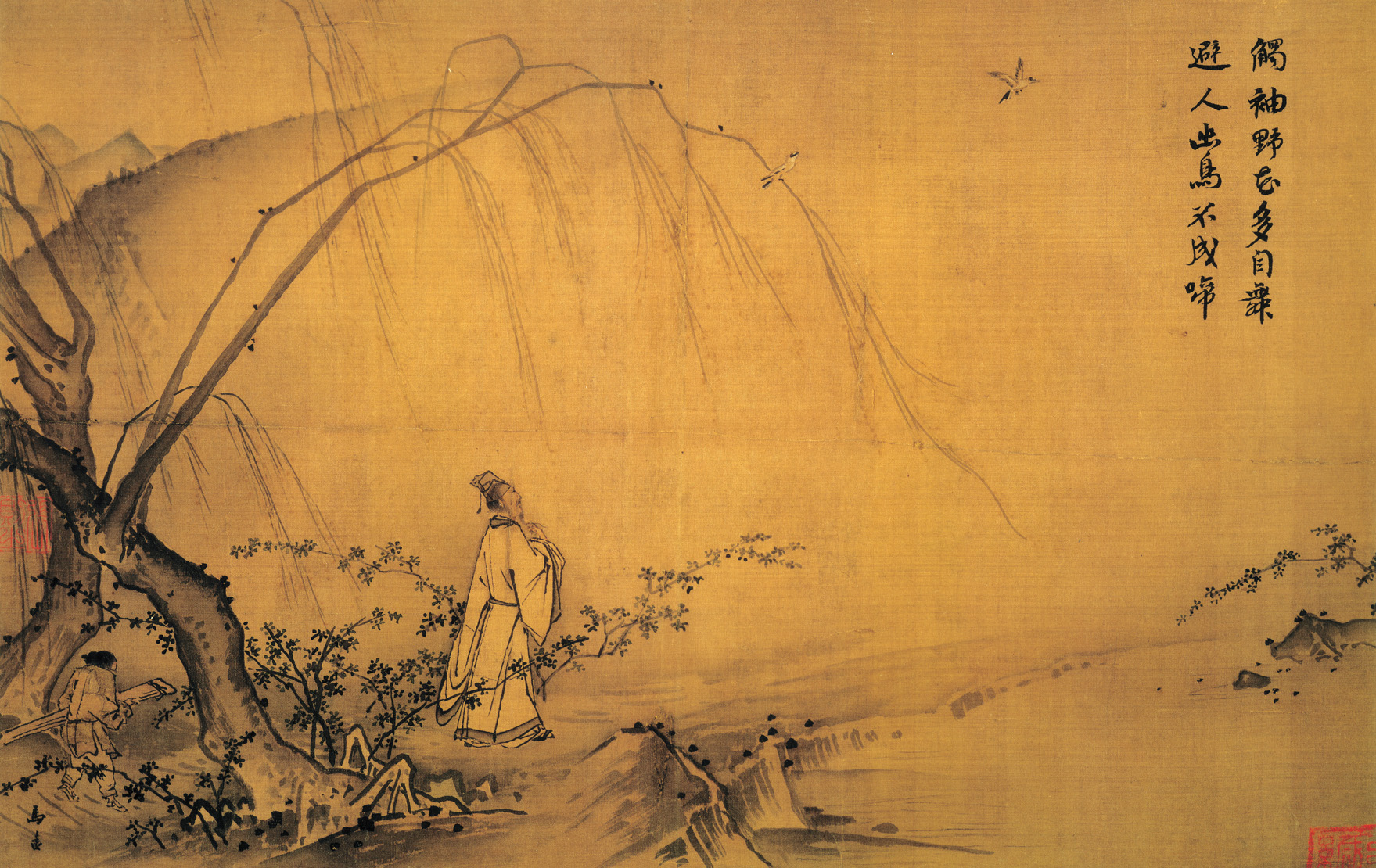

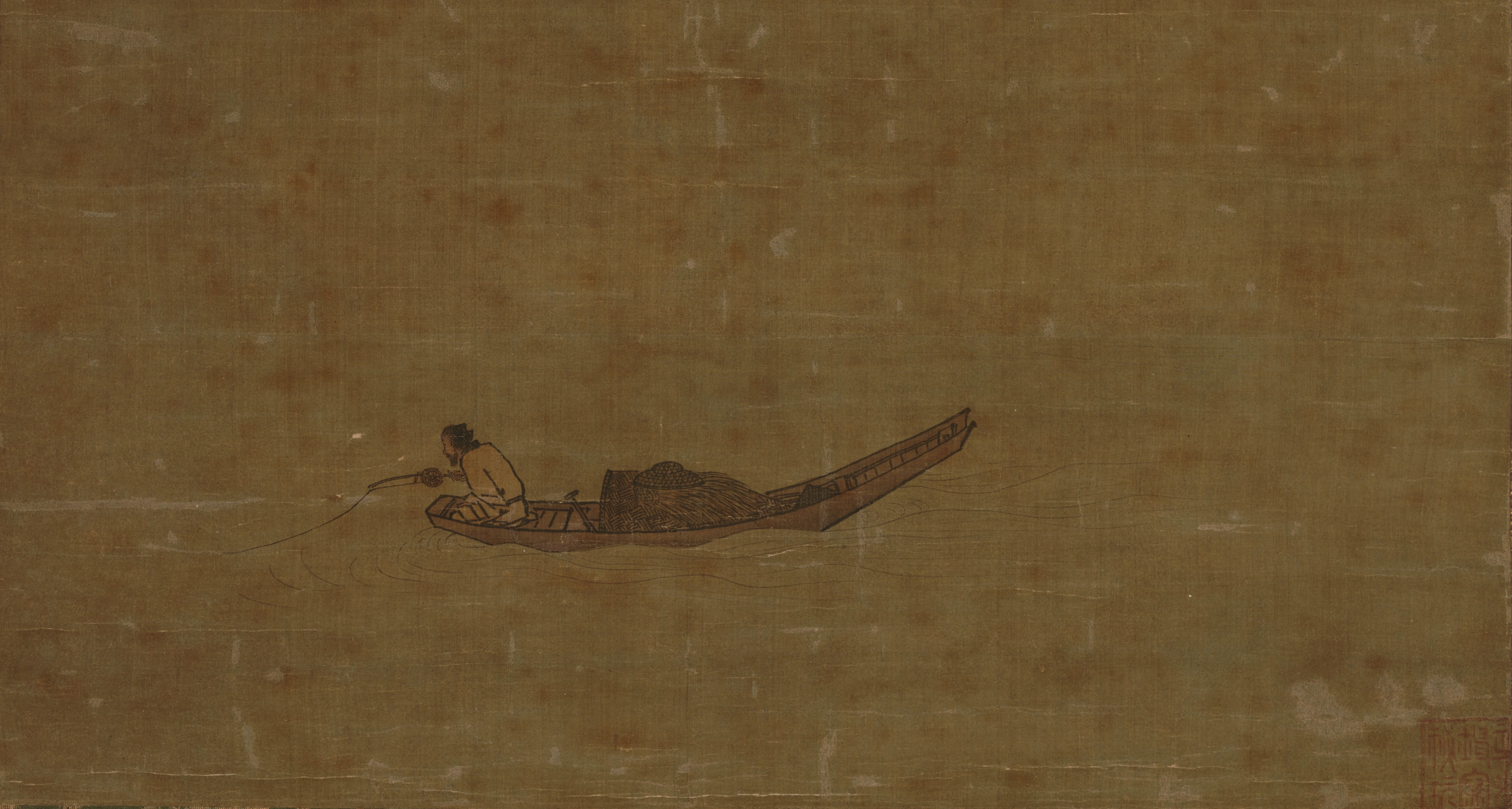

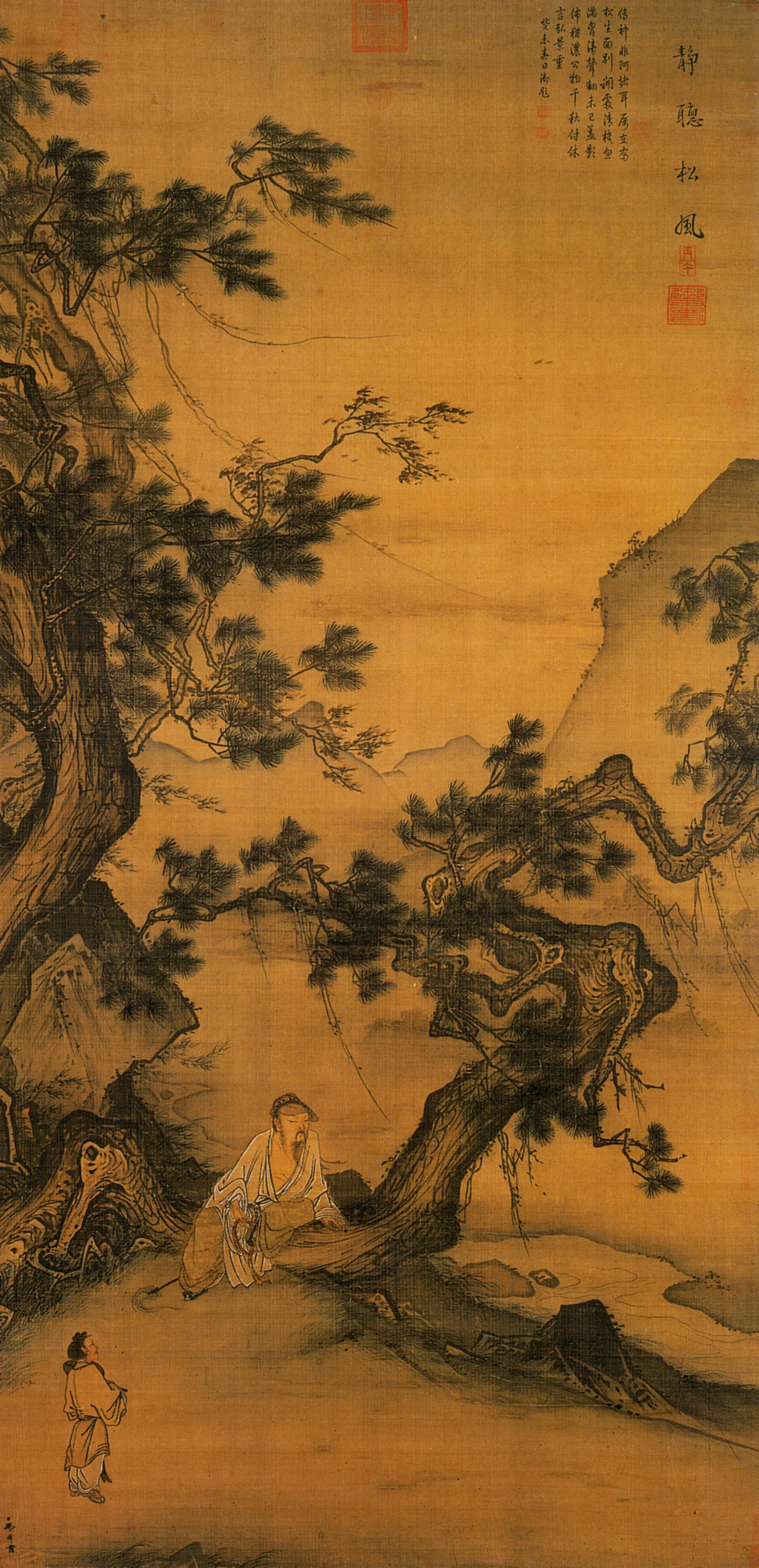

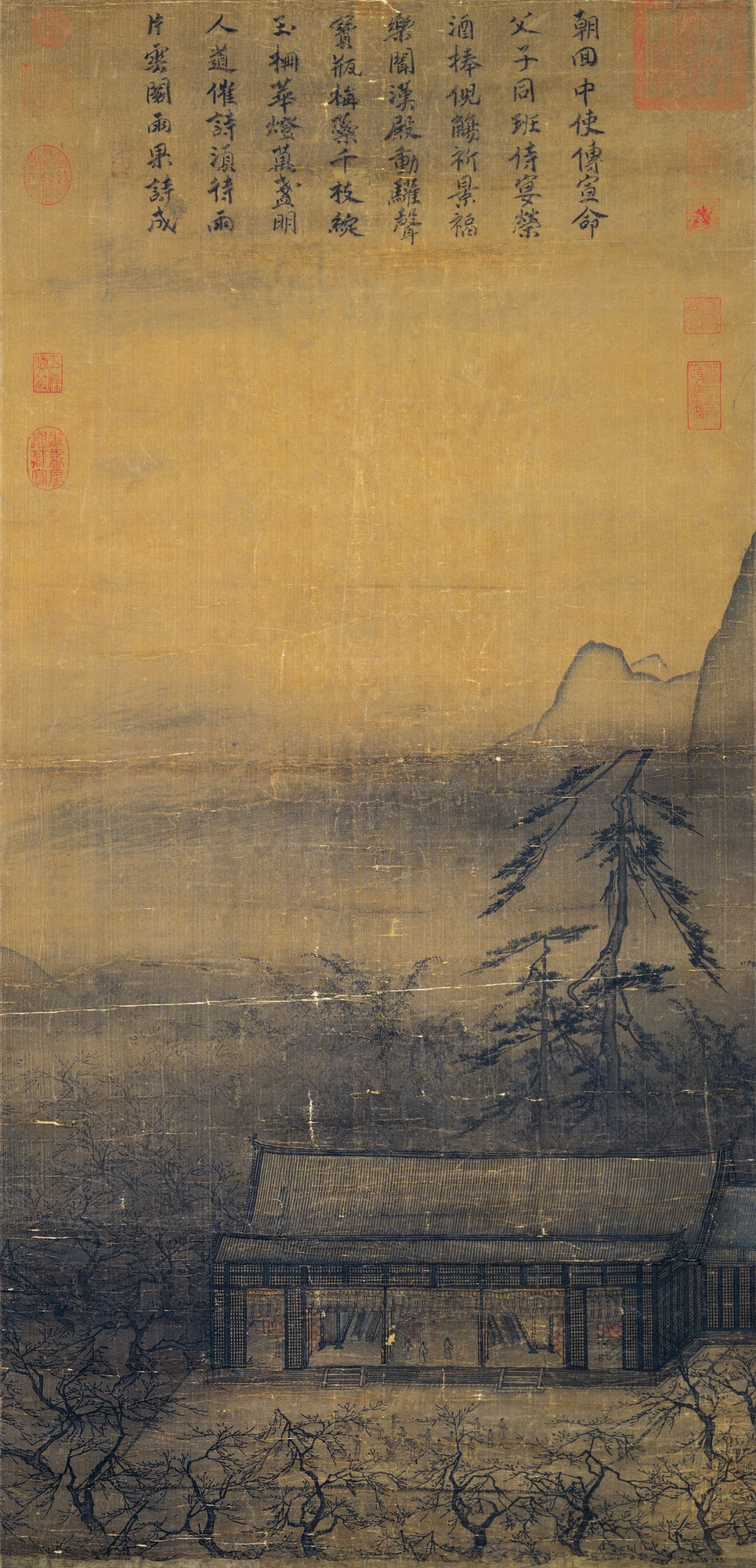

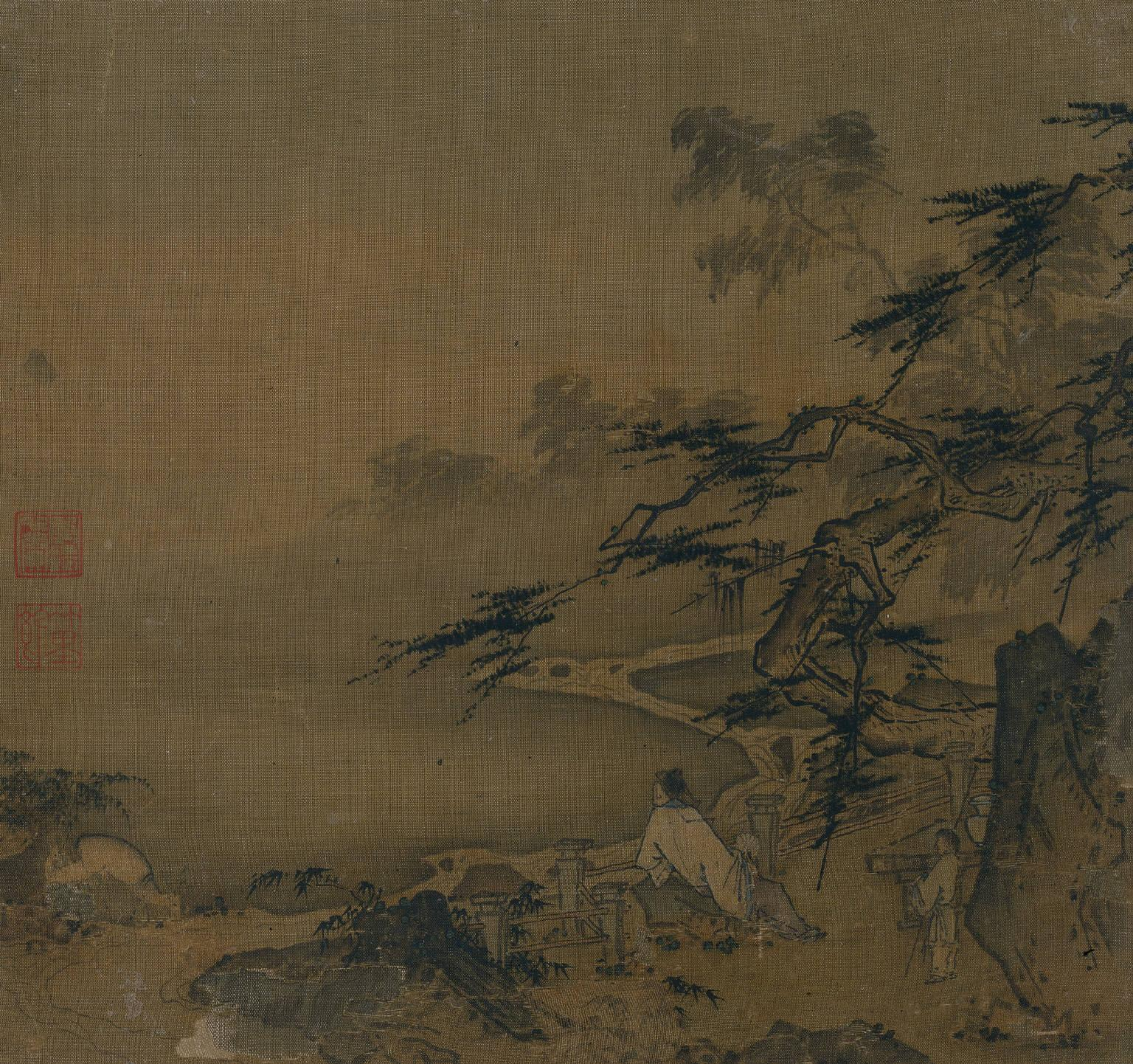

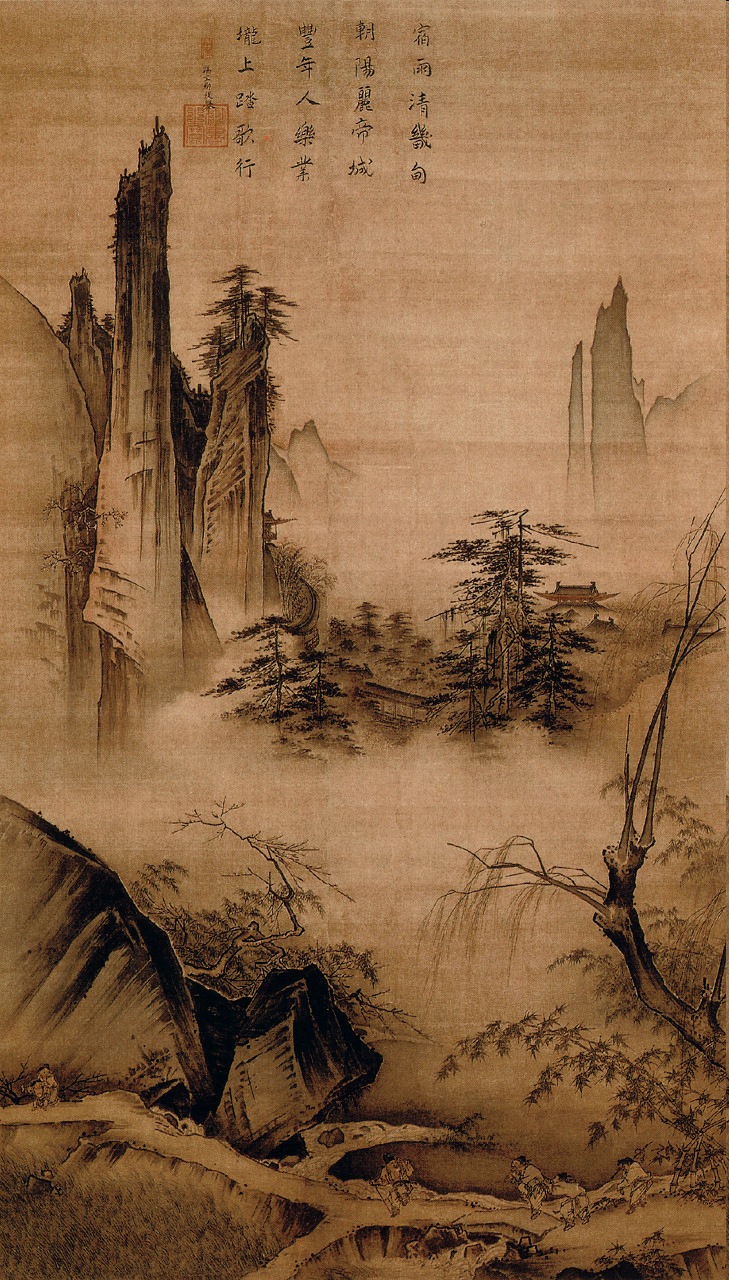

== See also ==
- Culture of the Song dynasty
- Chinese painting
- Chinese art
- History of Chinese art
