= National Museum of Asian Art =

Smithsonian Museum Washington D.C.

Coordinates: 38.8880°N 77.0268°W

National Museum of Art
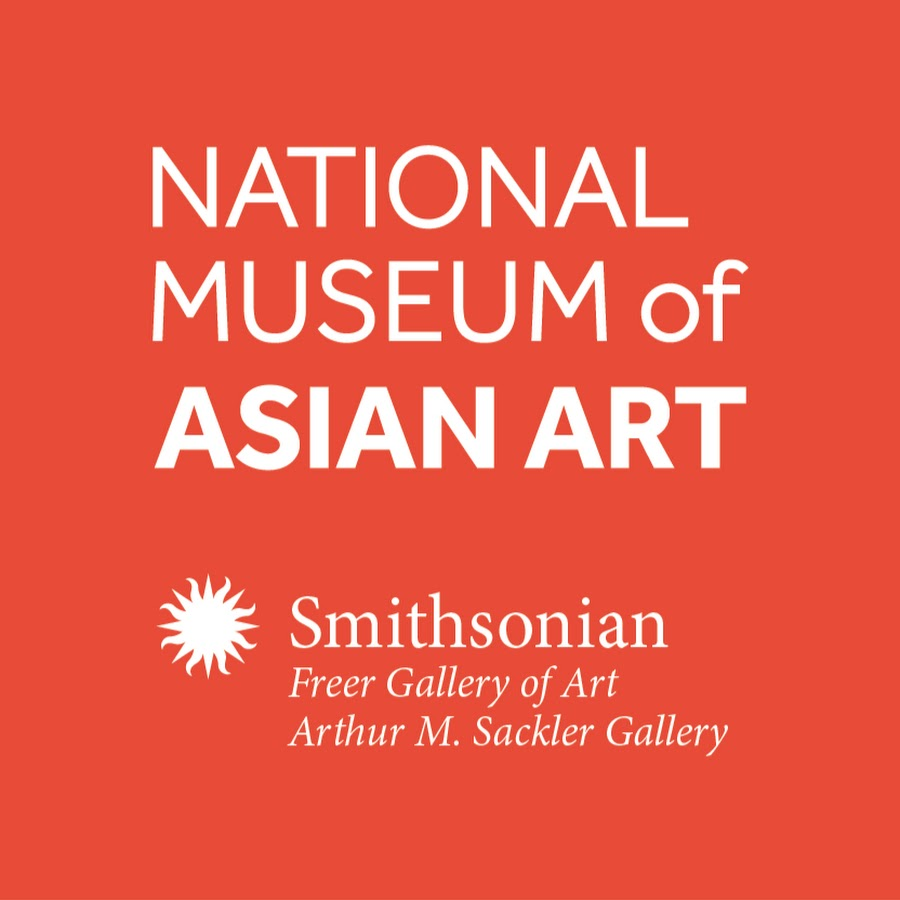
- Location: 1050 Independence Ave SW, Washington, DC 20004
- Website: asia.si.edu

The National Museum of Asian Art consists of the Smithsonian Institution’s two Asian art galleries, the Freer Gallery of Art and the Arthur M. Sackler Gallery, which are situated in connecting buildings on the National Mall in Washington, D.C. The galleries are operated by the same board of trustees and share a budget. Both institutions are run by the same management, curatorial and other staff. The two galleries feature 45,000 works of Asian art.

== History ==
First Lady Melania Trump and First Lady Peng Liyuan touring the National Museum of Asian Art, September 24, 2026

The Freer Gallery of Art opened in 1923 to display the nineteenth century American painting and Asian art collection of American industrialist Charles Lang Freer. Freer provided an initial endowment used to construct the gallery building. The Arthur M. Sackler Gallery was built next door to the Freer in 1987, after Arthur M. Sackler donated 1,000 objects of ancient Chinese art and $4 million for a museum to house them.

The museums have separate collections. Based on Charles Freer's will, the Freer gallery can exhibit only works in its collection, and those works are not allowed to travel. The Sackler gallery can accept loaned objects and can also loan pieces from its collection.

The museum is working to strengthen its connections with South Korea and art institutions there.

The museum ended cooperation with the Hong Kong Economic and Trade Office in 2022.

In February, 2023, the museum entered into an agreement with the government of Yemen to hold and preserve 77 works of art that had been looted from that country. The items will be returned to Yemen when the civil war there ends. Among the works are 65 carved stone funerary stelae, which are approximately 2,500 years old.

During Chinese leader Xi Jinping's state visit to the United States in September 2026, First Ladies Melania Trump and Peng Liyuan visited the museum, where they viewed various exhibitions including viewing a jade disk from the Shang dynasty, visiting The Peacock Room, viewing an 18th-century Qianlong-period Chinese porcelain, as well as looking at a scroll painting from the Yuan dynasty.
