= Chilean cuisine =

Culinary traditions of Chile

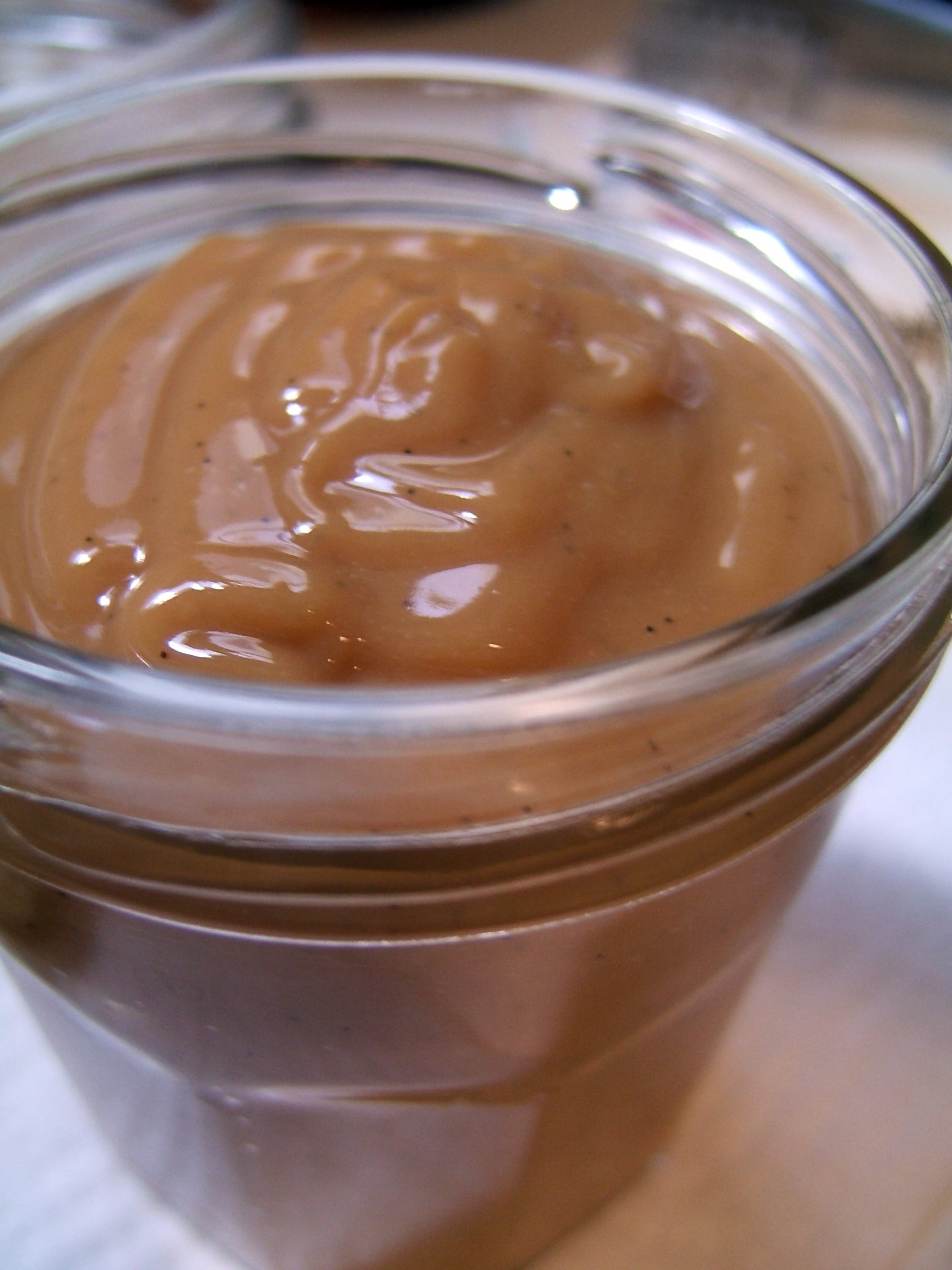
Dulce de leche, known in Chile as manjar

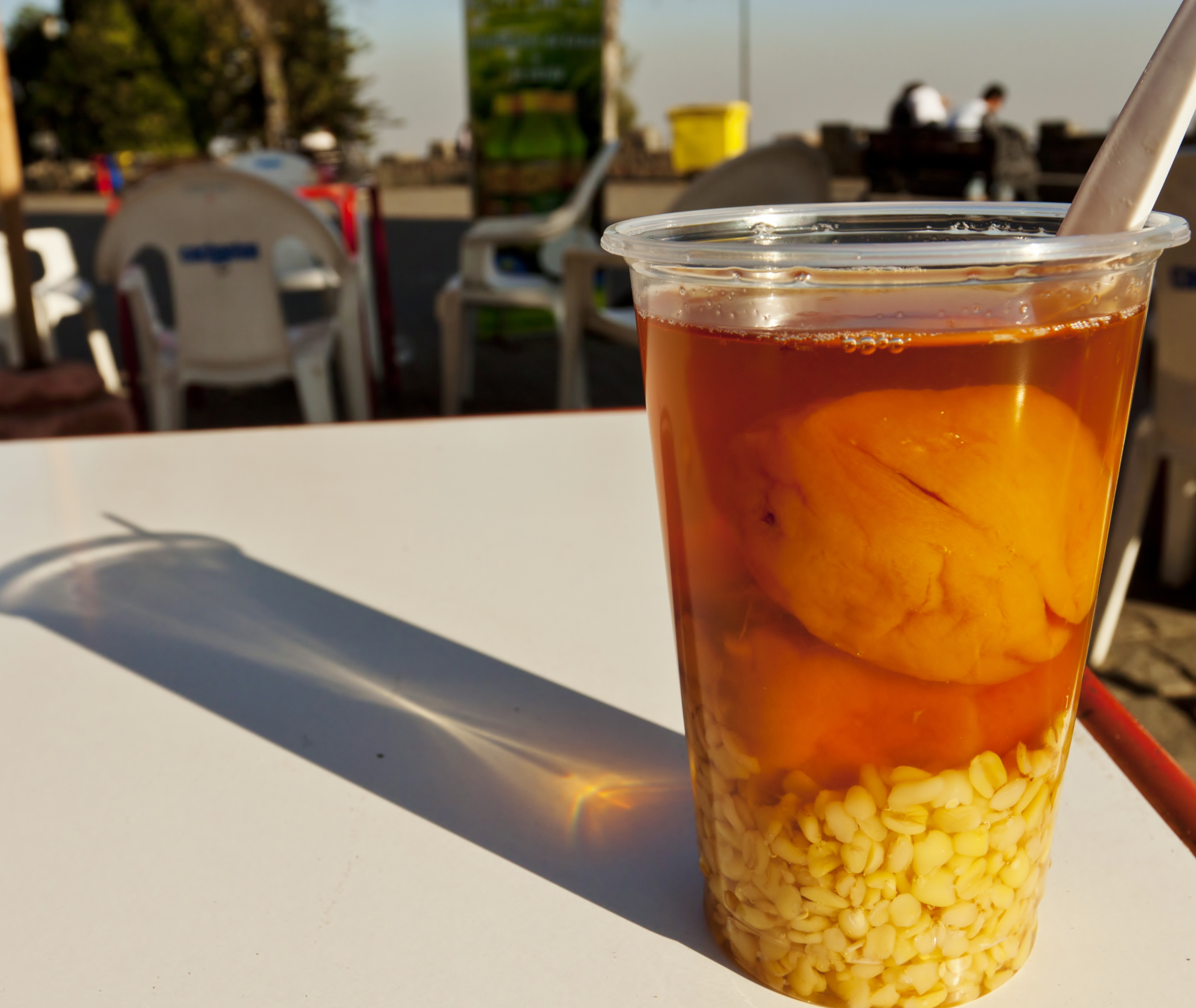
Mote con huesillo

Chilean cuisine stems mainly from the combination of traditional Spanish cuisine, Chilean Mapuche culture and local ingredients, with later important influences from other European cuisines, particularly from Germany, the United Kingdom and France. The food tradition and recipes in Chile are notable for the variety of flavours and ingredients, with the country's diverse geography and climate hosting a wide range of agricultural produce, fruits and vegetables. The long coastline and the peoples' relationship with the Pacific Ocean add a notable array of seafood to Chilean cuisine, with the country's waters home to unique species of fish, molluscs, crustaceans and algae, thanks to the oxygen-rich water carried in by the Humboldt Current. Chile is also one of the world's largest producers of wine and many Chilean recipes are enhanced and accompanied by local wines. The confection dulce de leche was invented in Chile and is one of the country's most notable contributions to world cuisine.

Chilean cuisine shares some similarities with Mediterranean cuisine, as the Matorral region, stretching from 32° to 37° south, is one of the world's five Mediterranean climate zones.

== History ==
With the arrival of the Spanish conquerors led by Pedro de Valdivia in 1540 came some of the products that would become staples of Chilean cuisine—wheat, pigs, sheep, cattle, chickens and wine—while the native peoples contributed potatoes, maize, beans, and seafood. Various combinations of these basic ingredients form the basis of most characteristic Chilean dishes. After the establishment of the colony, products and dishes like chuchoca (coarsely ground dry corn), humitas, locro, and seaweeds like cochayuyo and luche served with boiled eggs became popular. Meals in colonial times tended to be heavy and rich. Lunch was always bigger than dinner, starting with a dish called de residencia of fish, meat, or poultry, followed by a guiso stew with choclo (fresh sweet corn) and potatoes. There were three kinds of bread accompanying the meals: tortilla de rescoldo, Spanish bread (made of fatty dough), and Chilean bread (flat and crunchy). Lunch and dinner ended with herbal infusions, generally paico to help digestion, and finally fruit for dessert, mainly strawberries and lucumas.

In the seventeenth century, pastry was popularized by the nuns who baked it in convents. A popular Chilean saying, “tiene mano de monja” (“s/he has the hands of a nun”), comes from this period and refers to someone who is skilled at baking or cooking in general. The nuns’ pastry recipes quickly become popular among the rest of the Chilean population. During the same period, geese and turkeys arrived in Chile from Mexico and melons and watermelons came from Jamaica. During the eighteenth century, Chilean cuisine started to become more sophisticated, particularly among the aristocracy. Tea and coffee began to replace mate, Chilean wine became popular and people started to drink chicha, a sweet, undistilled wine made from fermented grapes or apples.

During the early years of Chilean independence, the so-called Patria Vieja, Chileans celebrated with empanadas, chicha and red wine, which is still traditional today at the annual celebrations of independence.

=== Immigration to Chile ===
During the nineteenth century, Chile began to form its own identity and food became a part of this. Immigration, which had been limited and incidental at the beginning of the young republic, was now actively encouraged by the Chilean government between late nineteenth century and early 20th century. The variety of produce increased with the arrival of German immigrants in the south of the country, who had a strong influence on Chilean cuisine, even until today. They brought with them pork dishes, sausages and pastries. Today, Berliners, strudels, and kuchens are common in bakeries throughout Chile. Italian immigrants contributed pasta and meat products, and in towns like Capitán Pastene in the south of Chile, they still prepare prosciutto in the same way as the first Italian immigrants.

In the twentieth century, French culture had a strong influence on Chile, including its cuisine. French gastronomy and techniques influenced the preparation of the food, and even replaced some dishes, for example the Spanish tortilla, which was replaced by the omelette. Along with the Italians, Germans, and French came Croatians, Greeks, Palestinians, Belgians and Basques. In the 21st century, Chile is a modern and prosperous country with strong economic growth bringing greater disposable income and the consequent development of a rich gastronomic industry.

To some extent, food consumption is related to blanqueamiento or whitening. For example, in Osorno, a Chilean city with a strong German heritage, consumption of desserts, marmalades and kuchens whitens the inhabitants of the city. While indigenous and raw dishes such a ñachi are associated with masculinity, European cuisine and specially desserts are considered feminine.

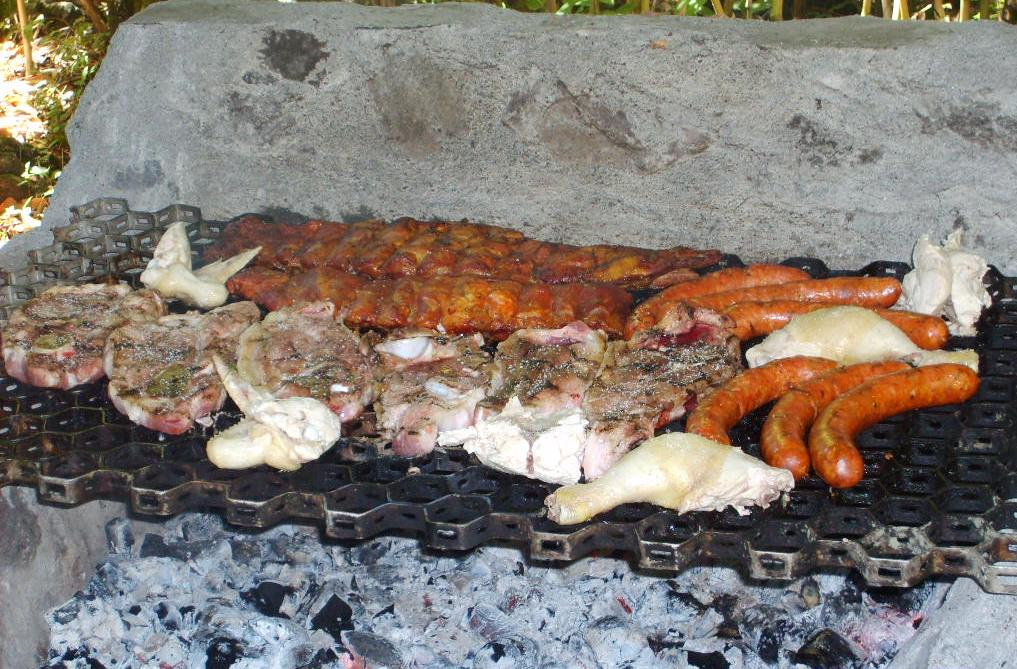
Asado Chileno

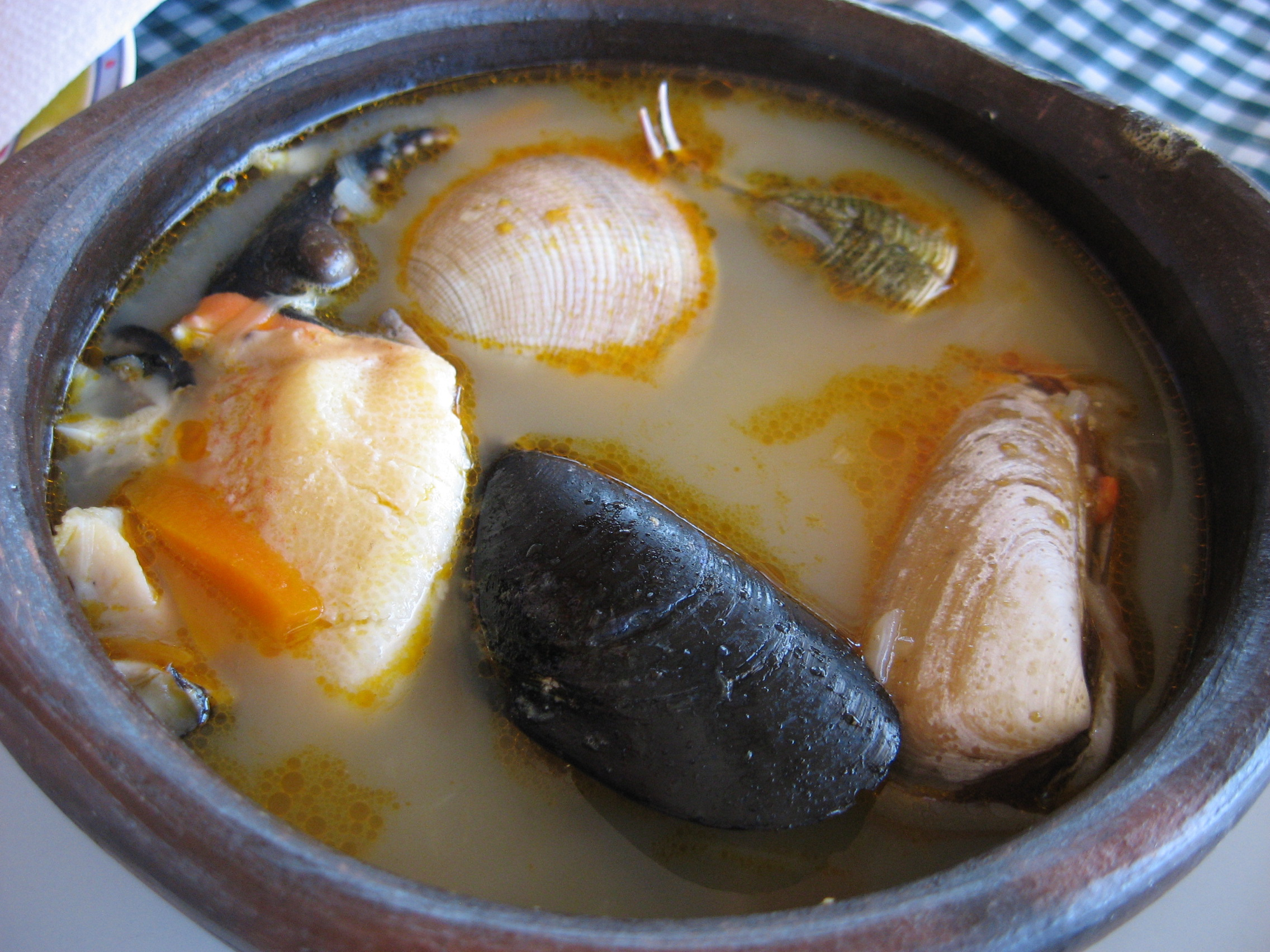
Paila marina, a shellfish soup containing different kinds of cooked fish and seasoned with herbs.

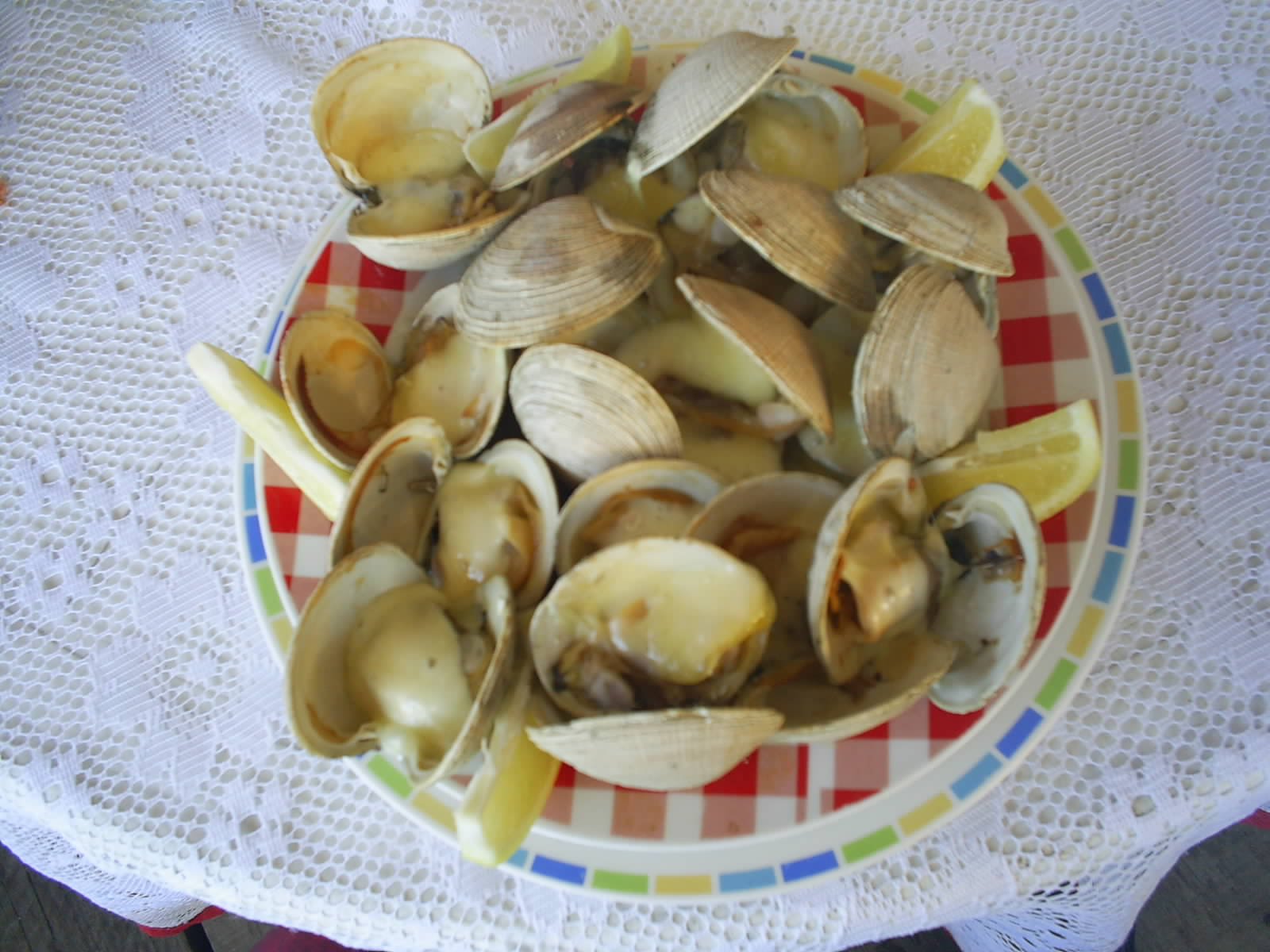
Almejas a la Parmesana

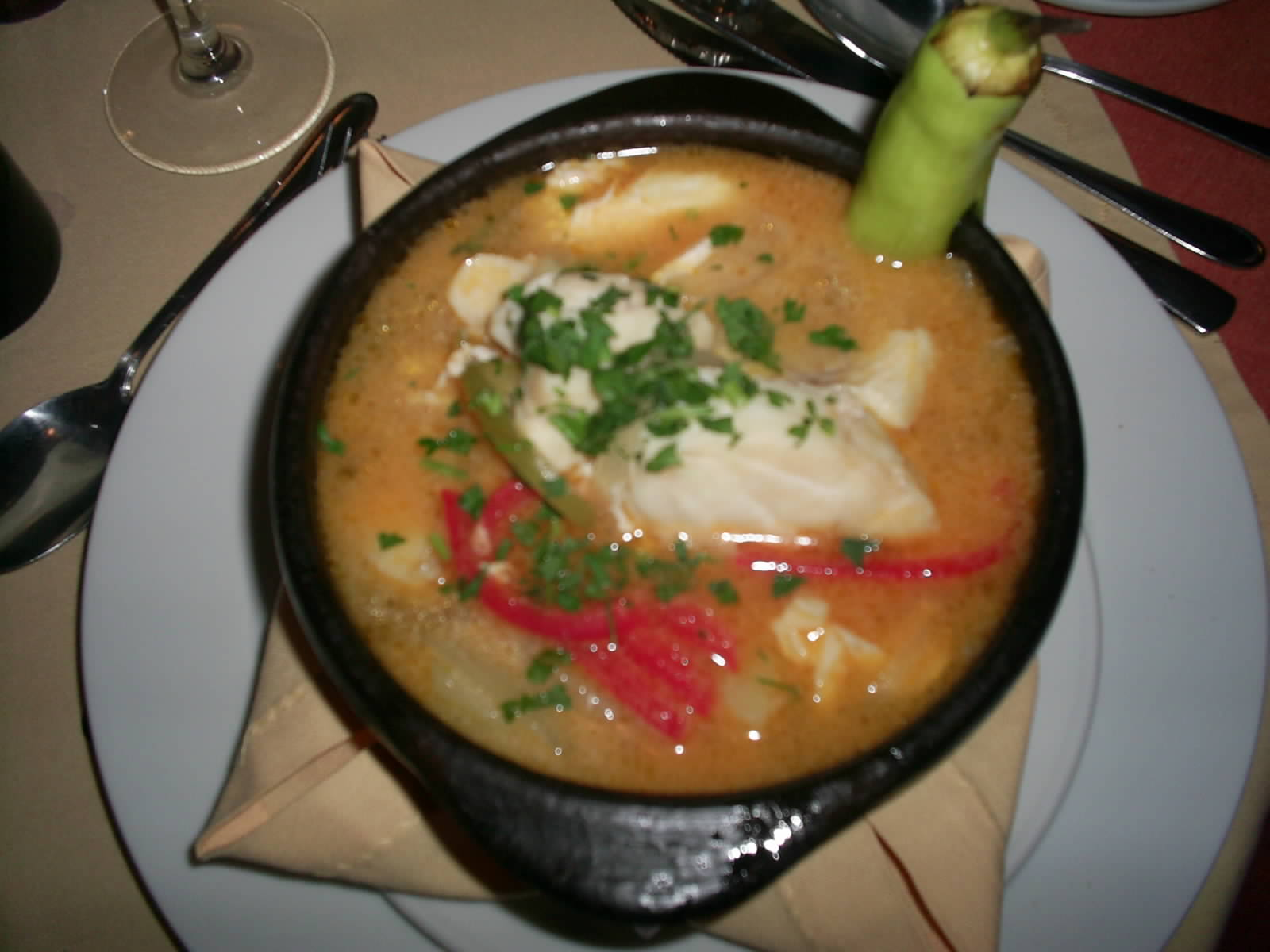
Caldillo de congrio (“caldillo” is a clear thin soup)

== Major crops and products ==
Agriculture in Chile encompasses a wide range of different activities and products, due to the unique geography, climate and geology. Historically, agriculture was one of the bases of Chile's economy; now, however, agriculture and related sectors like forestry, logging and fishing accounts for only about 4.9% of the GDP. Major agricultural products of Chile include grapes, apples, pears, onions, wheat, maize, oats, peaches, garlic, asparagus, beans, beef, poultry, wool, fish and timber.

=== American crops ===
- Cherimoya or chirimoya: this fruit native to the subtropical regions of the Peruvian Andes Mountains is widely consumed and produced.
- Maize: Known in Chile and Peru as choclo, and in some English-speaking countries as corn, maize was the staple diet that prospered in the empires of the Maya, Aztecs, and Incas. It was also cultivated using varying techniques by the Atacameño people of northern Chile. Through trade and travel, maize was brought to and eventually embraced by the Mapuche, who began using it in their own preparations. Chilean choclo is a different variety of maize than that known elsewhere. It originated in Peru and is distinguishable by its very large kernels, which are tougher than North American corn, and its savoury, somewhat nutty flavour.
- Lúcuma: A subtropical fruit of Peruvian Andes origin, native to Peru, lúcuma is grown in southern Ecuador and the northern coast of Chile. The fruit is very nutritious, having high levels of carotene and vitamin B_{3}. Lúcuma is exported all over the world and is a popular flavour for desserts and ice cream.
- Murta or murtilla: an endemic shrub native to southern Chile. The Mapuche name is uñi, and Spanish names include murta and murtilla (“little myrtle”); it is also sometimes known as “Chilean guava”. It was used by the Mapuche before the arrival of the Spaniards. It is used in the preparation of jams and liquor.
- Potato: Featured heavily in dishes such as cazuela, the potato has two centres of origin, namely the South of Peruvian Andes (Solanum indigenous) and the Chiloé Archipelago (Solanum tuberosum). It is a fundamental ingredient in a wide array of dishes.
- Quinoa: grown as a crop primarily for its edible seeds, quinoa originated in the Peruvian Andean region of South America, where it has been an important food for 6,000 years. Varieties of quinoa are grown in Concepción and Temuco.
- Nalca or pangue: The Chilean rhubarb is a plant species native to southern Chile. Its leaves are used in the preparation of curanto and the stems in salad, as fruit or in preserves.
- Avocado: Palta, as it is called in Chile, has been consumed since pre-Hispanic times. Avocado originated in Mexico and Peru. The Chilean variety is called Negra de la Cruz (“La Cruz Black”) after the town of La Cruz in the Valparaíso Region, the main producer; it is also called Prada or Vicencio.
- Aji verde (green chili): One of the most common varieties in Chile; called green chile because it is consumed before its maturation.
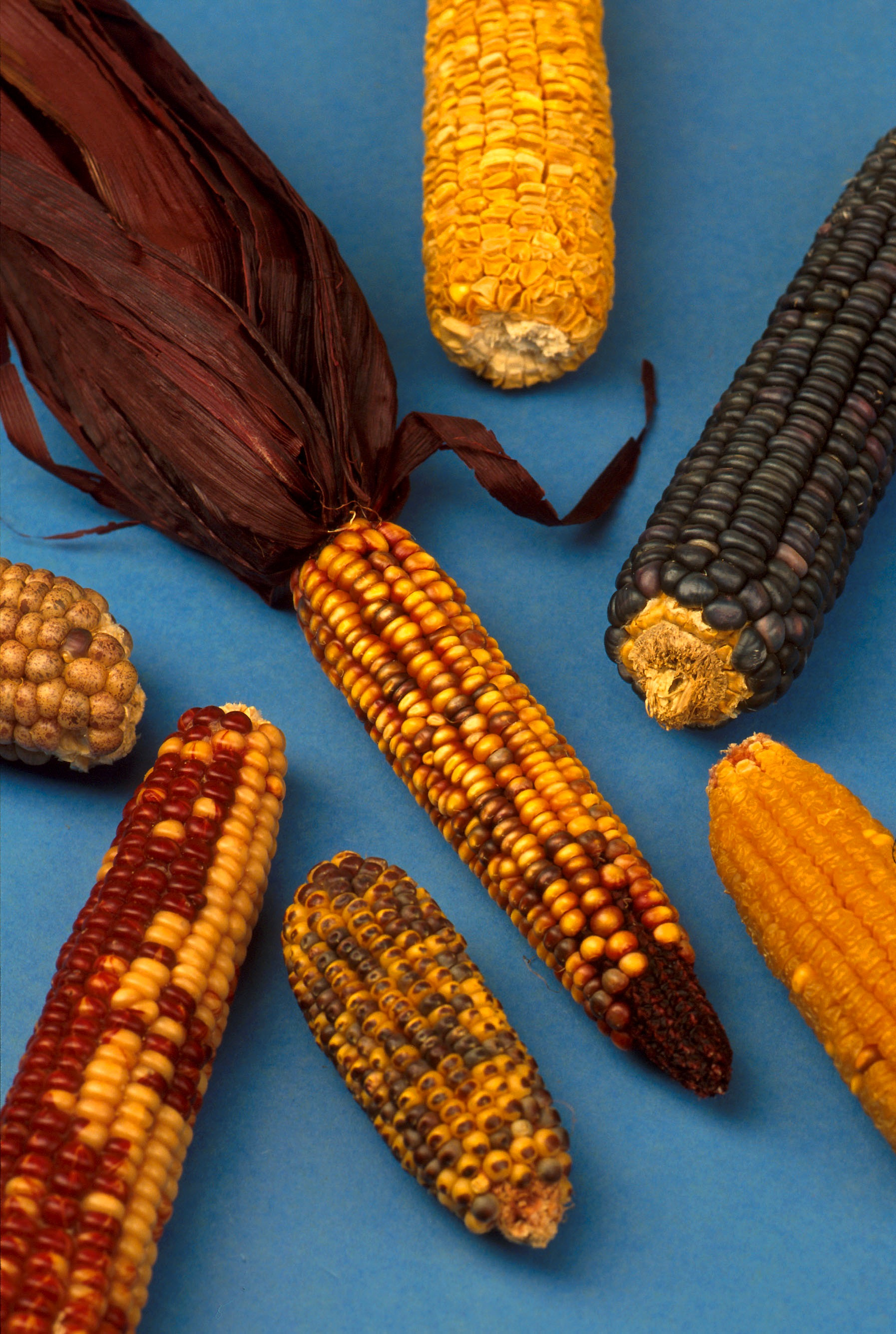
Choclo

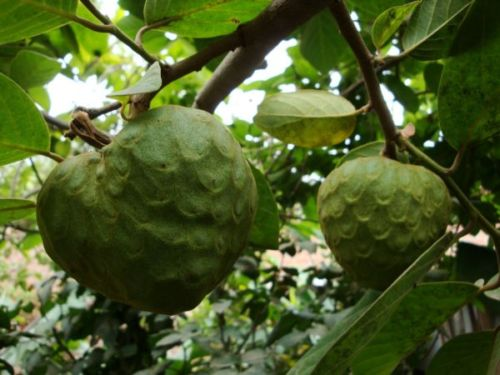
Chirimoya

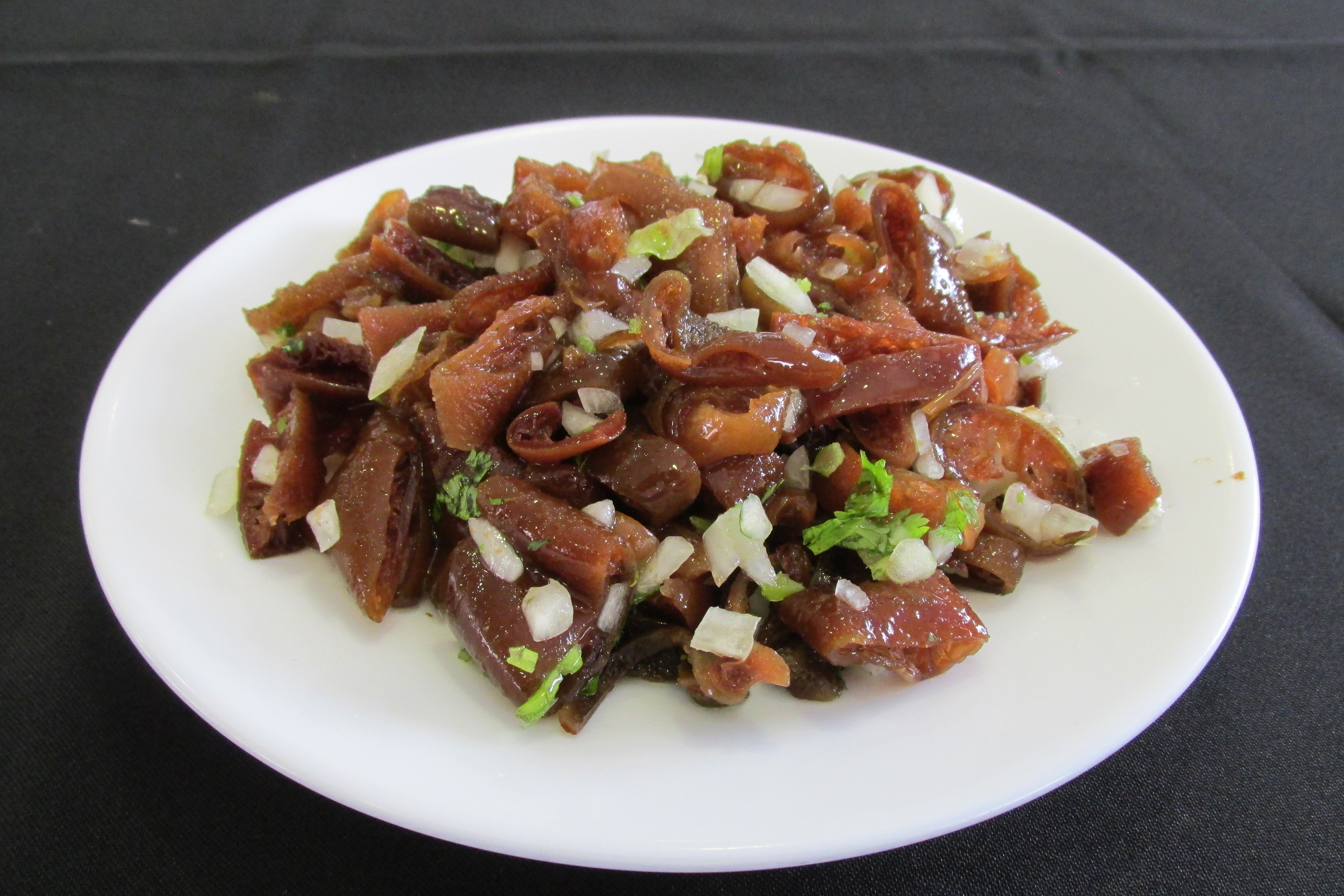
Cochayuyo salad

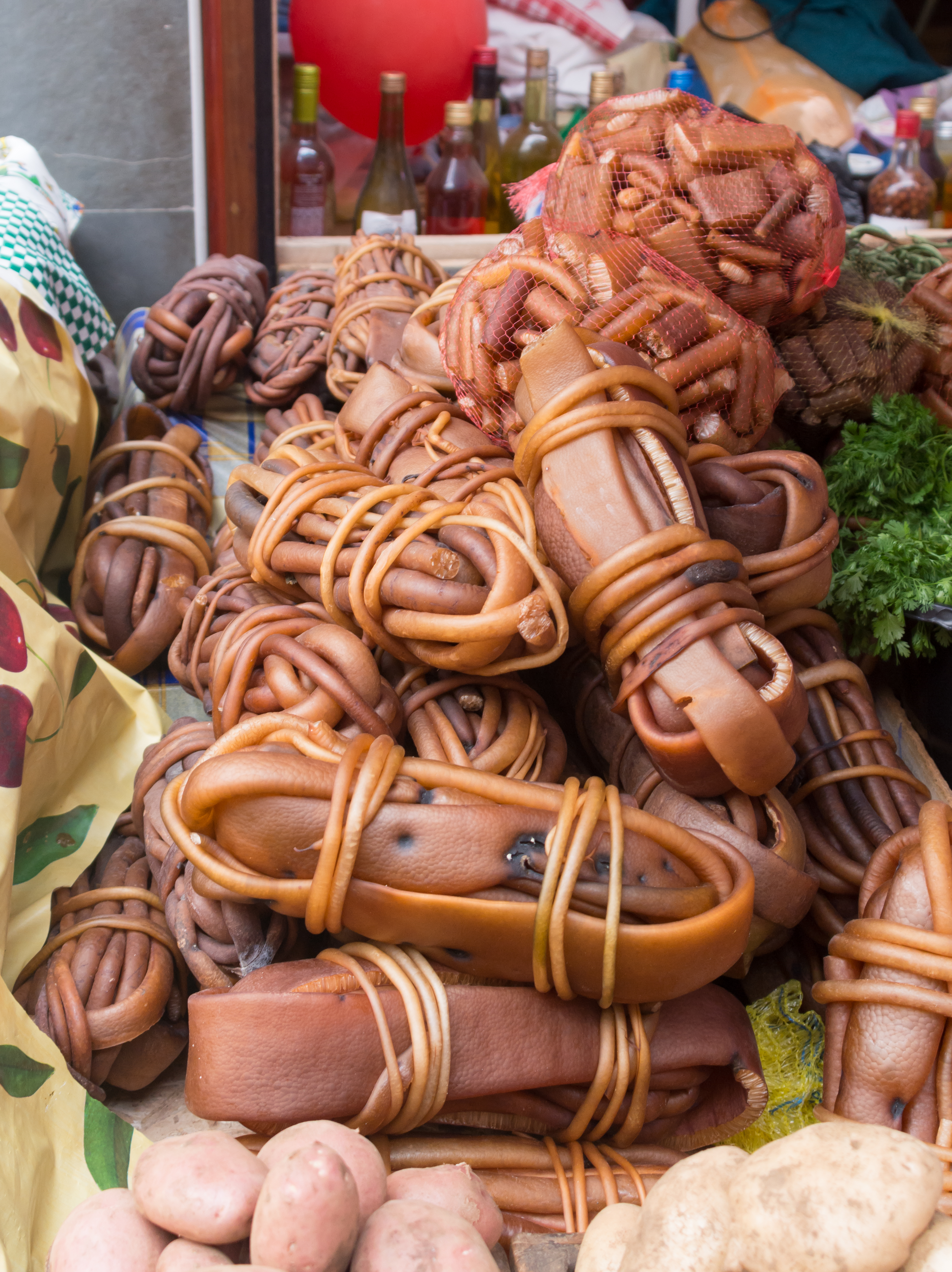
Bundles of cochayuyo

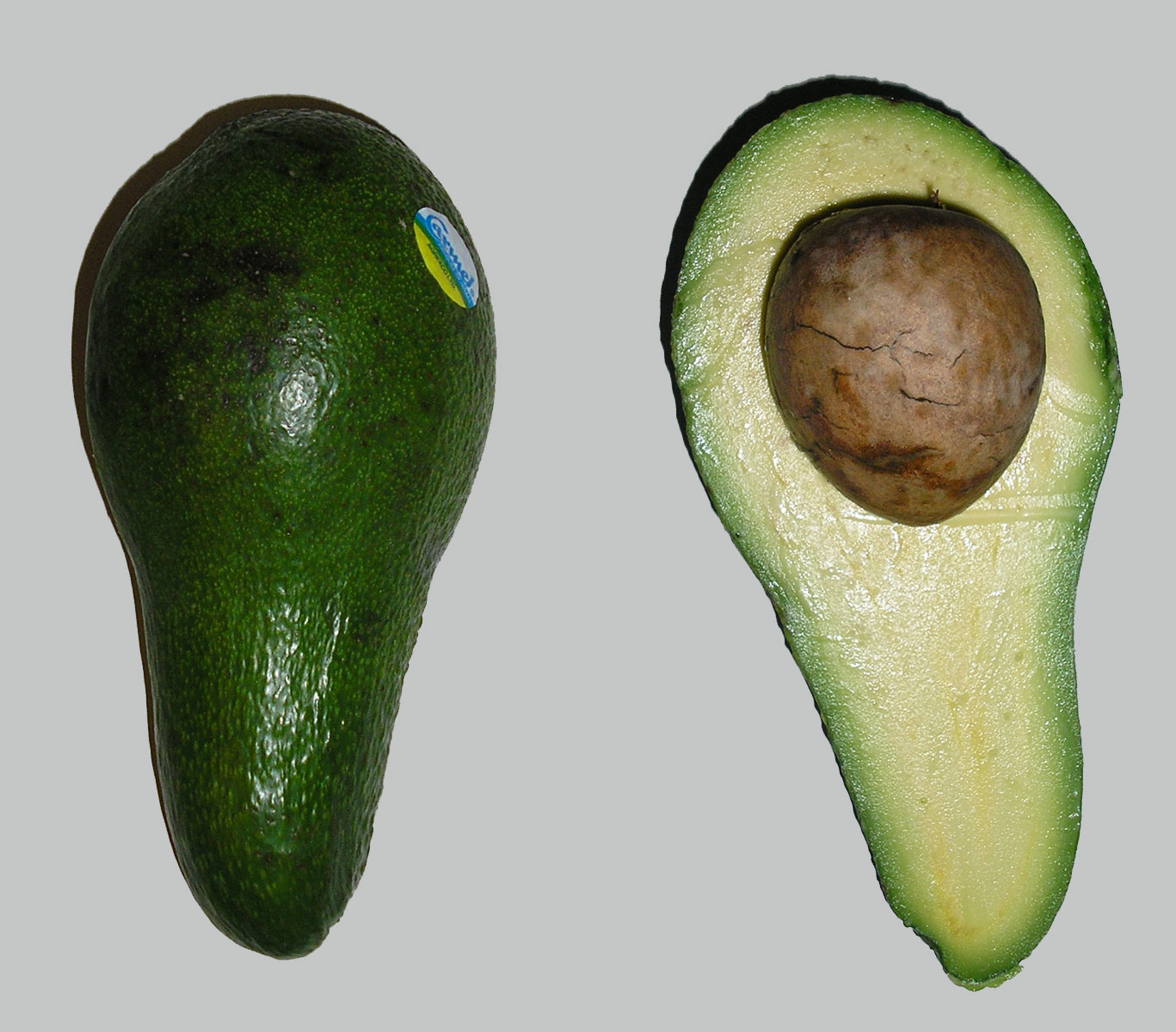
Avocado

=== Old-world crops ===
- Artichoke
- Garlic
- Lemon
- Lettuce
- Olives: Although originating in Europe, olives from Azapa in Arica are considered a variety of their own, typical of the dry northern region, and are widely recognized in Chile.
- Onion
- Quince
- Wheat

=== Fish and seafood ===
A characteristic of Chilean cuisine is the variety and quality of fish and seafood, due to the geographic location and extensive coastline. The Humboldt current brings a supply of seafood that gathers along the Pacific coast perpendicular to Chilean waters. These include:

==== Fish ====
- Soleidae (Solecane *use)
- Albacore
- Codfish (bacalao)
- Hake (merluza)
- Sciaenidae (corvina)
- Salmon
- Tuna
- Jurel
- Reineta (southern ray's bream, Brama australis)
- Congrio
- Patagonian toothfish (lubina)
- Swordfish (albacora)

==== Seafood ====
- Abalone
- Macha similar to Ensis macha is a kind of razor clams.
- Prawn
- Choros or mussels, (mejillones in other Spanish speakers countries)
- Clam
- Centolla Chilena or southern king crab
- crab (jaiba)
- Shrimp
- Oyster
- Lobster
- Langosta de Juan Fernández (Juan Fernández Island lobsters)
- Locos
- Picorocos
- Pyura chilensis (piure)
- Squid (jibia)
- Sea urchin (Erizo)
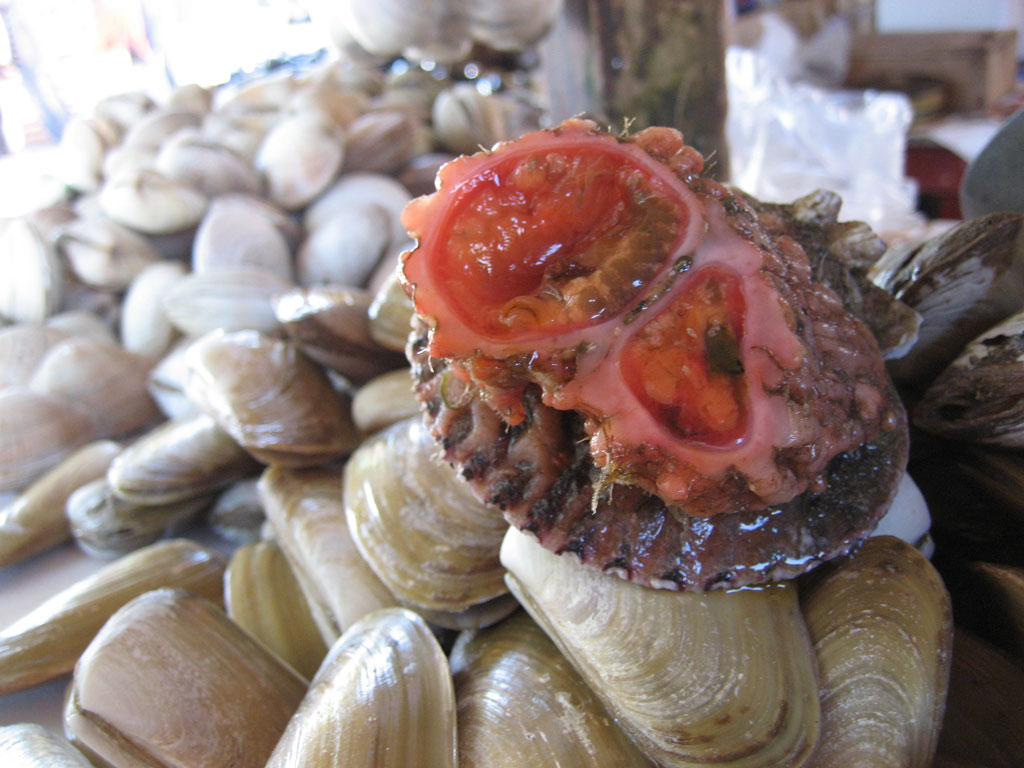
Pyura chilensis (Piure) on machas

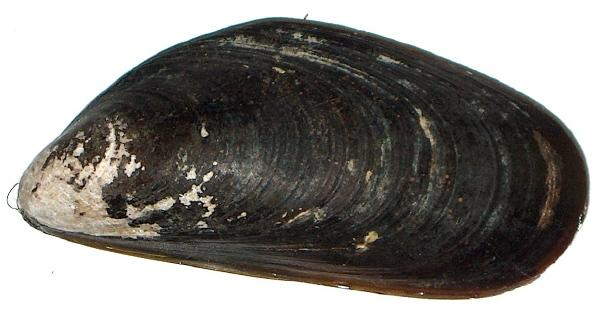
Chorito (Chilean Mejillon)

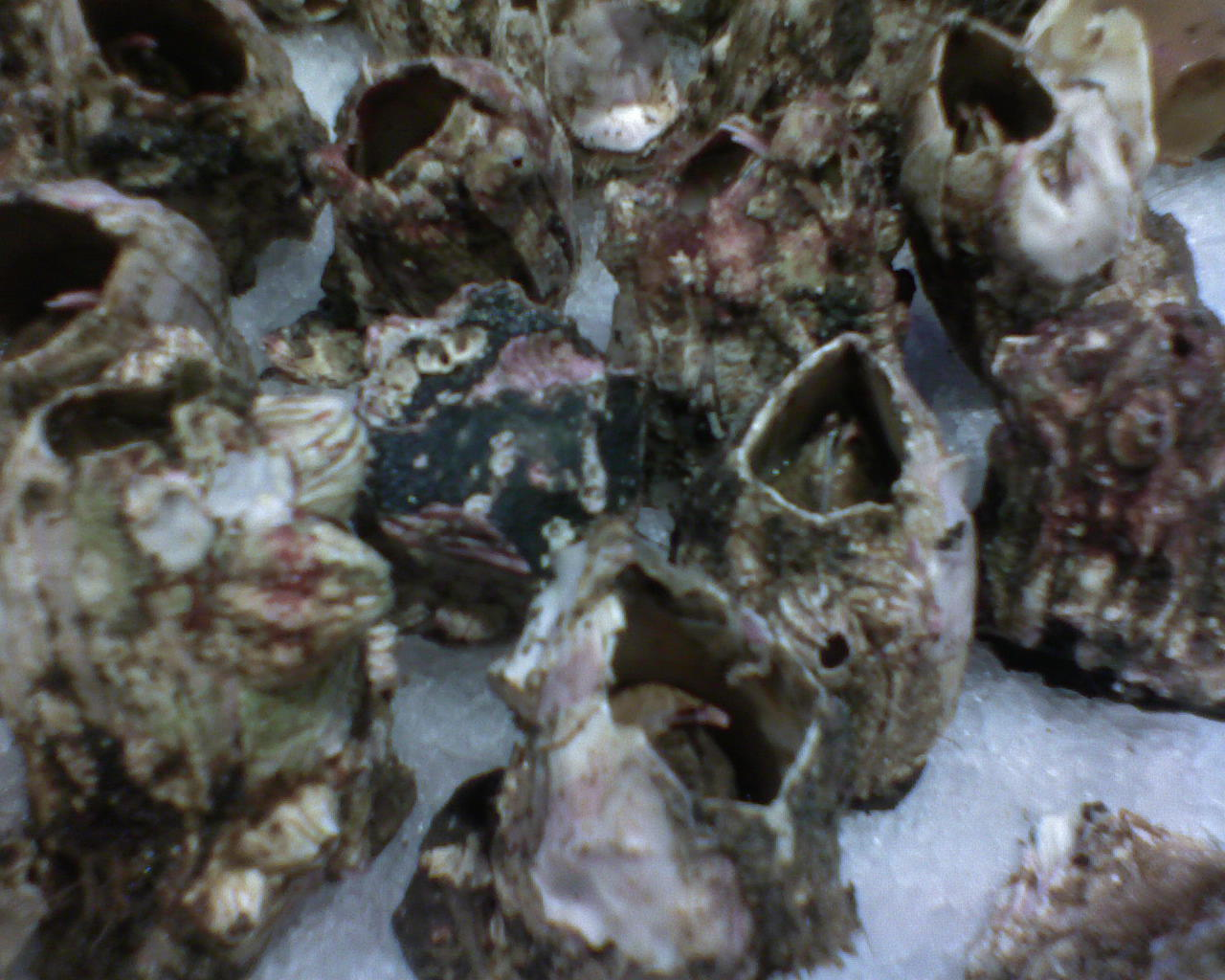
Picorocos

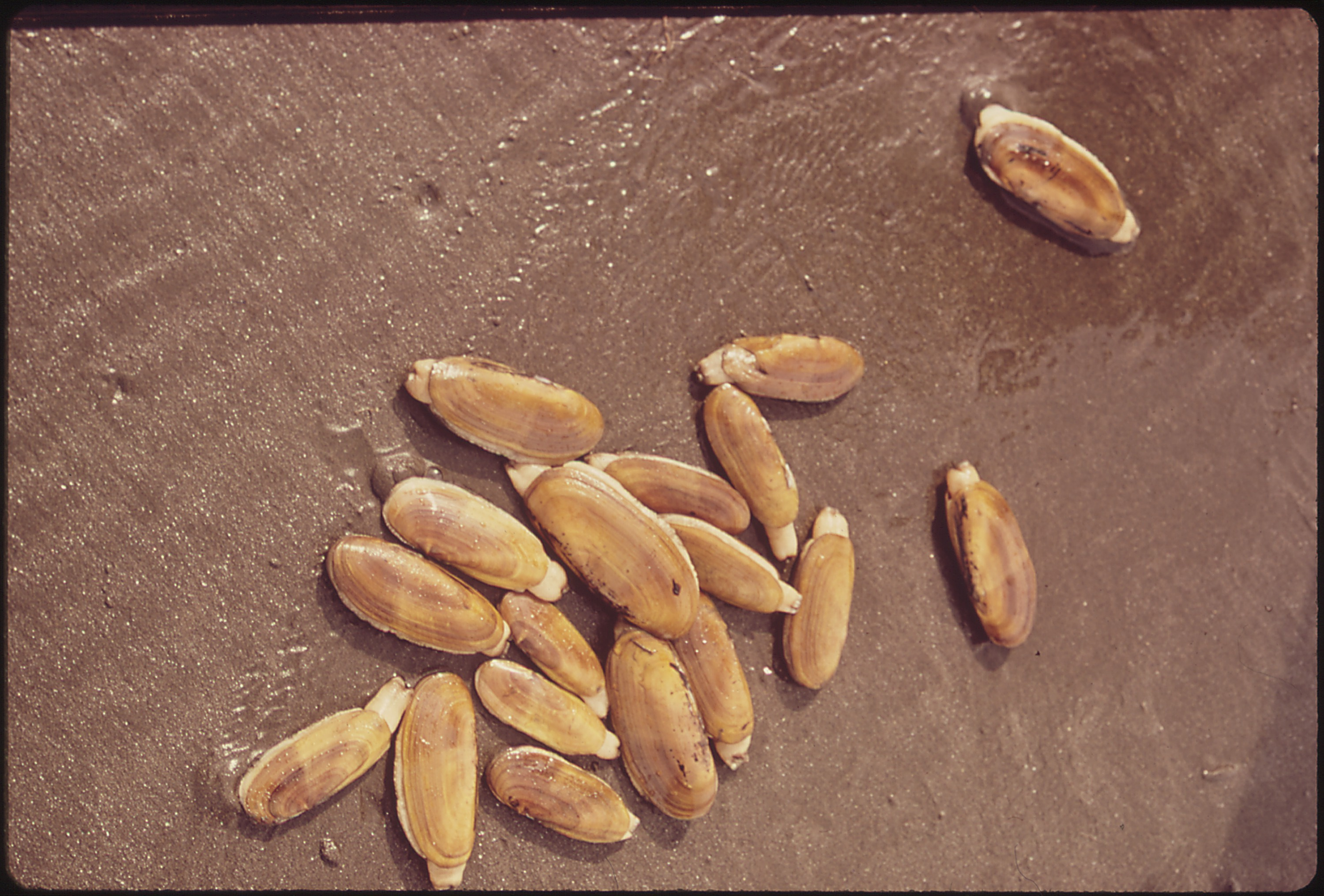
A Pacific razor clam similar to Chilean machas

== Cuisine of the north ==
Northern cuisine is strongly influenced by the Andean Aymara, Diaguita and Atacameño cultures, and also by the coastal Chango people. The northern diet is traditionally high in protein. The use of tubers like the apilla or oca and the ulluco is common, though these are practically unknown in central and southern Chilean cuisine. Traditional northern Chilean cuisine also includes the use of camelid meats like llama and alpaca. The herb rica-rica, which is endemic to the region, is used as a seasoning. Dishes like chairo have been prepared for centuries by the Andean cultures, although they are not as common nowadays among the northern Chilean population and are almost unknown in the rest of Chile.

=== Recipes from the northern regions of Chile ===
- Asado: Meat roasted on the barbecue. In the north it is possible to find asados prepared with alpaca meat.
- Chicharrón de papa: Pieces of meat and fat from llama and lamb, boiled and then fried. It may be served with potatoes or salad, or consumed as a snack by farmers and peasants.
- Guatitas: A stew of cow stomach (guatita means “tummy”).
- Chairo: An altiplanic llama stew, one of the least known in the rest of Chile.
- Charqui: Dried and salted meat, originally llama.
- Carapulcra: Spicy soup, with potatoes, corn and different kinds of meat.
- Tortilla de mariscos: A kind of omelette of beaten eggs fried with seafood and chorizo, similar to prawn tortilla from Spain.
- Machas a la parmesana: A type of shellfish similar to the razor clam that is cooked in the oven with bits of Parmesan cheese and other condiments. It is often eaten as an appetizer.
- Conchas de camarones: Prawns, leeks, and cheese, milk and other ingredients form a mix that is served in oyster shells.
- Erizos con salsa verde: Sea urchin is very abundant in the Chilean seas, but its extraction is limited by the government to only certain times of the year. It is often eaten raw as an appetizer with a little lemon, coriander or parsley, and onion.
- Caldillo de congrio: A fish stew with conger eel and vegetables, commonly found throughout the country.
- Picante de conejo, cow stomach or chicken: Spicy dish of vegetables fried and stewed with meat of rabbit, chicken, or cow stomach. Hand crushed potatoes are added at the end.
- Plateada con quinoa: Literally “silver-plated”. A cut of beef known in English as “rib cap” is cooked with quinoa, onions, garlic and white wine.
- Cazuela marina: A stew of different types of seafood, such as razor clams, oysters and shrimp, similar to paila marina but with more vegetables.
- Estofado de cordero: Lamb stew.
- Ensalada chilena nortina: Onions and tomatoes prepared a la julienne. It is similar to the basic ensalada chilena with the addition of goat cheese and olives.
- Ensalada de quinoa: Quinoa salad comprising quinoa and other vegetables.
- Timbal de quinoa: A mix of quinoa, avocado and other ingredients; served shaped like a timbal drum.
- Risotto de quinoa y pimientos amarillos: Quinoa risotto with yellow peppers.
- Sango: A kind of bread made from wheat flour cooked with oil and salt; served with chicharrones

== Cuisine of the central valley and coast ==
The cuisine of the central valley and coast has been influenced by the traditions of the native people and European immigrants, particularly those who arrived during the second half of the nineteenth century, with farm life and agriculture the most important influence. In the past, agriculture was a very important aspect of the economy and the Fundo (ranch, farm) was the centre of everyday life. Country traditions still survive and food is a good example of this.

=== Dishes from the central regions of Chile ===
- Sopa de mariscos: A soup of mixed seafood.
- Locos con mayonesa (“locos with mayonnaise”), accompanied usually with lettuce and potato salad.
- Palta reina: Avocado stuffed with chicken salad, tuna, prawns, or other fillings.
- Tomates rellenos: Stuffed tomatoes, generally filled with sweetcorn, mayonnaise, and other ingredients.
- Pastel de choclo: a layered pie, usually made in a deep dish or a clay paila with chopped beef at the bottom prepared “al pino” (a thick stew of minced or chopped beef, chopped onions and seasoning), chicken, olives and a hard-boiled egg, topped with a mixture of ground fresh corn and basil, and baked in the oven.
- Humitas: similar to Mexican tamales, the humita is a mixture of fresh and ground corn baked inside corn husks.
- Porotos granados: a stew of fresh white beans, ground choclo and other vegetables.
- Albóndigas al jugo (meatballs in sauce)
- Cazuela de ave: like normal cazuela but with chicken instead of beef
- Empanadas fritas de queso: empanadas stuffed with cheese and then deep fried.
- Pantrucas: a type of dumpling or pasta made without eggs, cut in irregular pieces and later mixed with vegetable soup or beef stock.
- Charquican: a stew of charqui (dried beef) or regular beef, with potatoes, corn and other vegetables
- Jaibas rellenas: stuffed crabs
- Pastel de jaiba: crab pie
- Tomaticán: a thick vegetable stew, similar to Charquican but with tomatoes.
- Pastel de papa: a pie made in layers, with minced beef in the bottom and mashed potatoes on top, similar to the English cottage pie.
- Brochetas: a variety of anticucho or kebab
- Pan de Pascua: similar to a sweet sponge cake flavoured with ginger, cinnamon, liquor and honey. It usually contains candied fruits, raisins, walnuts and almonds.
- Pan amasado: a traditional type of bread, which has animal fat in it. It is kneaded for a long time to achieve a very dense type of bread.
- Leche asada: A baked milk dessert with caramel, similar to the original panna cotta made with eggs instead of gelatine, as it is made in most places today.

== Cuisine from southern Chile ==
Southern Chilean cuisine has been greatly influenced by Mapuche cuisine and Chilote cuisine. There are two products that have attracted particular attention: the Merkén condiment and the “Kollongka”, Araucana or Mapuche chicken, known by their unusual blue-green eggs. Another great influence on southern Chilean cuisine was immigration from Europe, particularly the German migration of the nineteenth century. Traditional German cakes and desserts have been adopted in much of Chile. As in the rest of Chile, seafood has a very important place in the diet, but due to the thousands of islands that make up the southern region, the ocean has a particular relevance here.

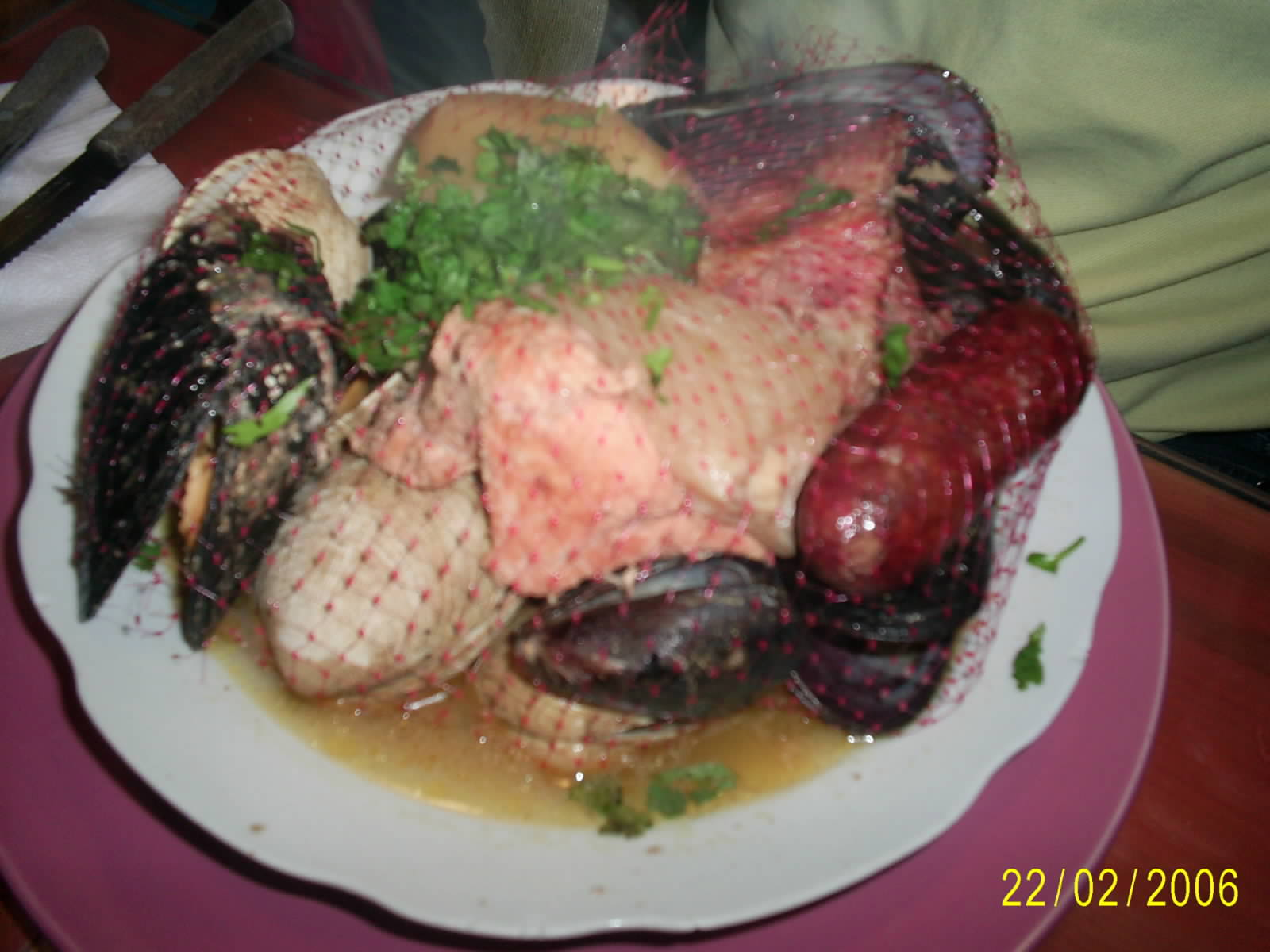
Curanto a la olla or Pulmay

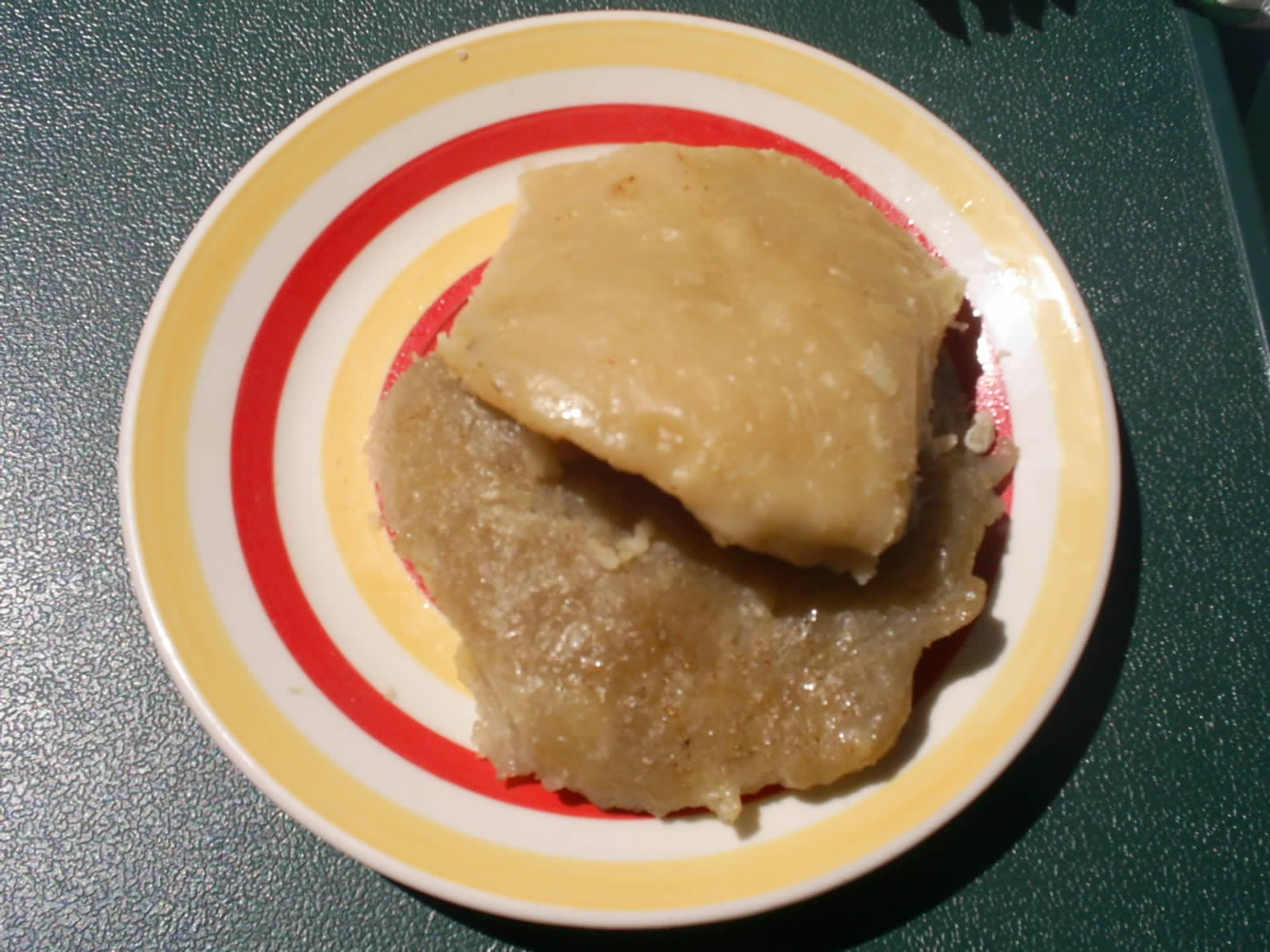
Milcao for the curanto

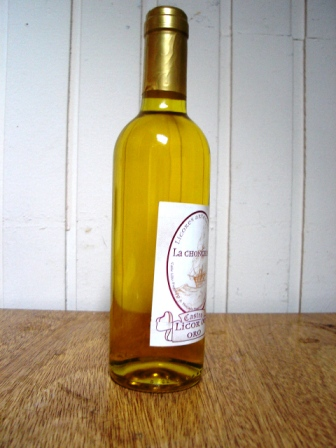
Bottle of Licor de oro

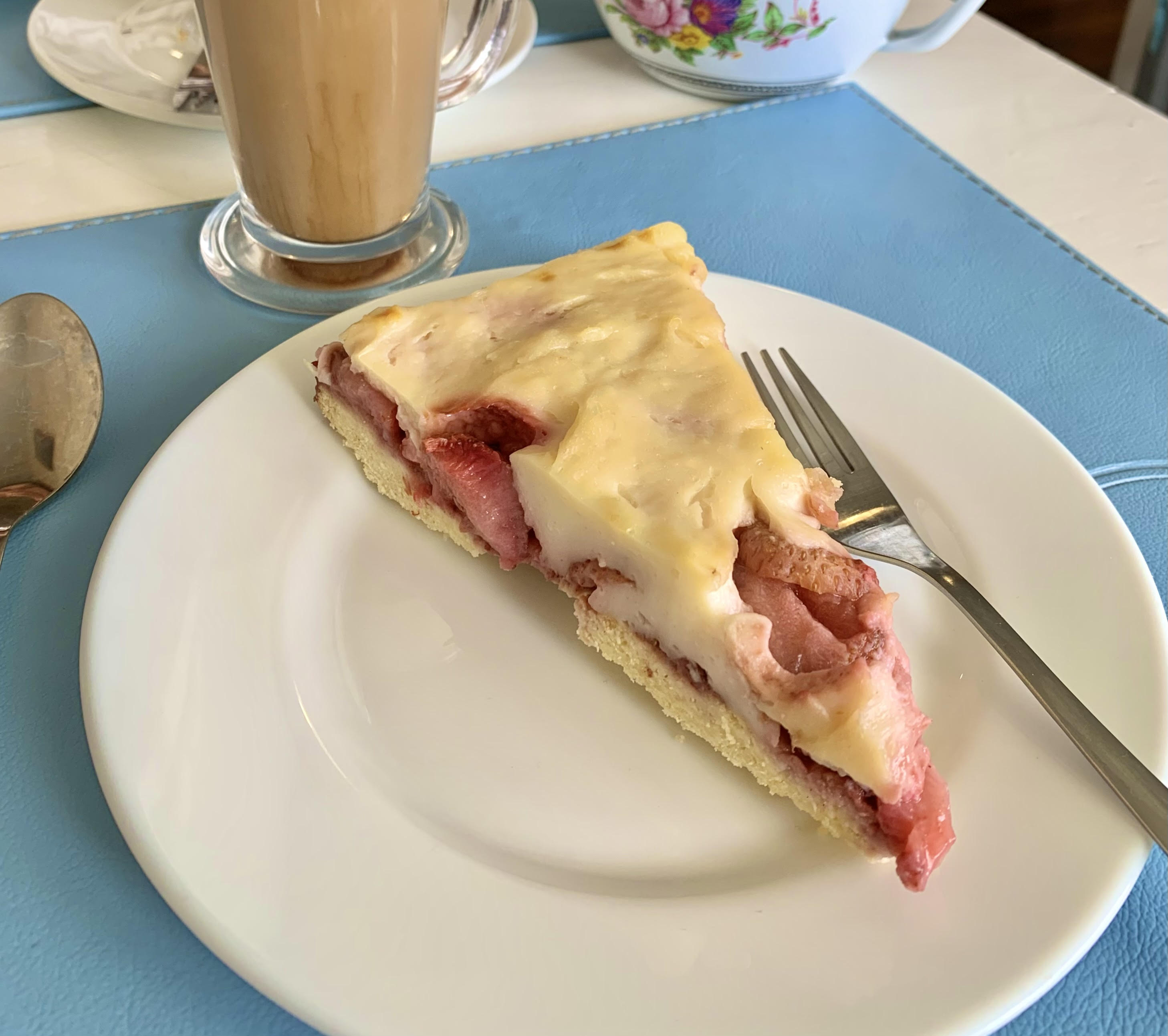
Kuchen, one of the Chilean traditional cakes introduced by German migrants

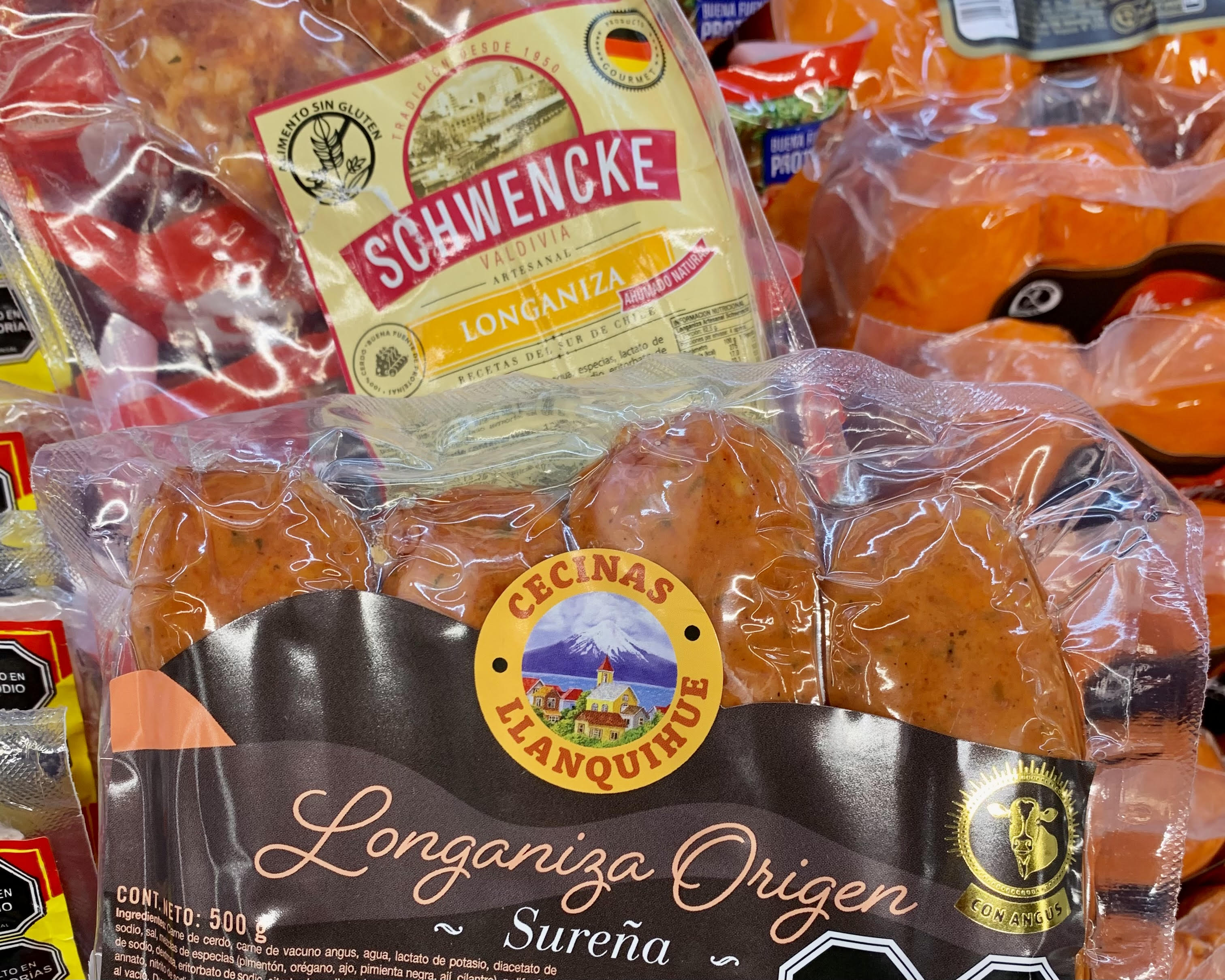
Sausage, brands from southern Chile with German influence

=== Dishes from southern Chile ===
- Merkén: a traditional Mapuche condiment, made with dried and smoked red chillis and coriander, ground to a fine powder. It is used to season all kinds of dishes.
- Araucana, Kollongka or Mapuche Chicken: Endemic to southern Chile, known by their light blue/green eggs.
- Caldillo de almejas: Clam soup (“caldillo” is a clear thin soup).
- Chupe de locos: A rich stew made with the loco or Chilean abalone, served with bread and baked in clay pots or “Paila de greda”
- Sopa de ostras: Oyster soup
- Pastel de pescado: Fish pie
- Arrollado de chancho and Arrollado de huaso: Pork roll and chilli roll.
- Asado de cordero: Lamb barbecue.
- Asado al palo: A form of roasting or barbecuing meat in which the whole animal (usually a lamb) is put on a stick next to a big wood fire and cooked for several hours until tender.
- Cancato: A baked stew of fish, cheese, onions and pepper, seasoned with lemon and wine.
- Cazuela chilota: The Chiloé version of cazuela differs from traditional cazuela because the stock is made either of dried cholgas (ribbed mussels) and cabbage or of luche (a brown leafy alga) and lamb instead of beef or chicken, giving it a very distinct flavour.
- Sopa chilota de pescado seco: Dried fish soup.
- Curanto: A traditional preparation where seafood and meat is cooked in a big hole in the ground using heated stones.
- Pulmay: A kind of curanto, cooked in a big casserole dish instead of a hole.
- Chapalele: A Chilean dumpling made from boiled potatoes and wheat flour.
- Crudos: Crudos (Spanish for “raw”) is a typical German-Chilean dish similar to a steak tartare.
- Empanadas: a stuffed baked pastry, filled with meat, onions and other condiments. They can also be fried or have different fillings.
- Milcao: The dish is a type of potato pancake prepared with raw grated potatoes and cooked mashed potatoes mixed with other ingredients.
- Chochoca: Also known as chochoyeco, trotroyeco or trutru, this is a traditional Chilote dish prepared with raw squeezed potatoes and boiled mashed potatoes or flour, stuck to a pole and roasted in a fireplace.
- Valdiviano: One of the oldest dishes in Chilean cuisine and named after the conquistador Pedro de Valdivia, this soup made of jerky, onions and potatoes was one of the dishes eaten by the conquering Spanish troops.

Baked goods, desserts and breads

- Brazo de Reina: a classic Swiss Roll, usually filled with strawberry jam, raspberry jam or manjar (Chilean dulce de leche), and topped with chocolate swirls or icing sugar.
- Empanadas de manzana: a baked pastry filled with baked apples and cinnamon.
- Kuchen: the traditional German cake filled with seasonal fruits such as strawberries, blackberries, apricots, plums, peaches, rhubarb, etc.
- Murta con membrillo
- Tortilla de rescoldo
- Mazamorra de manzana
- Sopaipillas: A deep fried dough. There are two versions: one plain, which is made with white flour, animal fat and water, and another in which pureed pumpkin is mixed to the dough. In each version, the dough is formed as disks and then deep fried. It can be eaten sweet, with icing sugar or a sweet caramel sauce, or as a salty snack, topped with a chili sauce or mustard.

Alcoholic and non-alcoholic beverages

- Chicha de manzana: A fermented apple cider.
- Chicha de calafate: chicha made with calafate, a berry that only grows in Chilean and Argentinian Patagonia
- Licor de oro
- Muday: an alcoholic beverage made of corn, wheat or piñón, the seed of the Araucaria araucana tree.
- Murtado: Made by preserving Ugni molinae (Murta) inside a bottle with aguardiente for some weeks and then mixing it with syrup.

== Other typical Chilean dishes ==
=== Easter Island or Rapa Nui cuisine ===
Easter Island cuisine includes dishes of both Chilean and Polynesian extraction. It includes a much wider array of fish than the mainland cuisine, and some fruits and tubers that are not possible to find in continental Chile.

- Ceviche: Can be made with soy or coconut milk, in contrast to the traditional continental version, and with mata huira (glasseye), toremo (yellowfin tuna) or kana-kana (swordfish).
- Po`e: Banana or cassava cake.
- Umu Rapa Nui: The Easter Island version of curanto.

=== Alcoholic and non-alcoholic beverages ===
Chile's unique combination of geography and climate make it ideal for wine growing. This tradition goes back to the sixteenth century and the arrival Spanish conquistadors, and has grown as an industry in recent decades, making Chile one of the world's biggest wine producers. Wine is not the only traditionally produced and consumed beverage, however: the northern regions produce aguardiente, a distillation of grape, the favourite liquor of many Chileans, and the southern regions are known for their high-quality beers.

- Borgoña (drink): Cold red wine with chopped strawberries and sugar.
- Chicha: Sweet fermented wine, usually made from grapes but sometimes from apples too. This is typically drunk around the 18 September independence day celebrations.
- Chilean Aguardiente: Similar to Italian grappa, made by distilling grape residues.
- Licor de oro (golden liquor): A liquor distilled from a mixture of aguardiente and fermented milk.
- Cola de mono (literally, monkey's tail): Made and consumed throughout Chile, this is a traditional Chilean drink served around Christmas time, very much like the tradition of serving eggnog during Christmas in North America. Its texture and taste are somewhat similar to a White Russian.
- Murtado: Liquor based on Aguardiente and Ugni molinae.
- Fanschop: A glass of half beer and half orange soda Fanta.
- Jote: Red wine with cola, popular among students.
- Melon con vino: Honeydew melon, called Melon Tuna in Chile, with the top cut off and filled with ice and wine.
- Navegado: Warm red wine with slices of orange and sugar, similar to mulled wine.
- Pipeño or Vino pipeño: A type of sweet fermented wine.
- Piscola: Pisco with cola and ice.
- Ponche a la Romana: Champagne with pineapple ice cream. Typically served on New Year's Eve.
- Terremoto (Earthquake): Vino pipeño with pineapple ice cream served in a one-liter glass. The next round usually contains the same drink though only in a glass that holds half a liter. This is called a Replica (aftershock).
- Mango sour: a mixture of aguardiente and mango juice, similar to the Peruvian pisco sour
- Papaya sour: a mixture of aguardiente and papaya juice.
- Pajarete: originally from Spain, a sweet viscous wine produced in the Atacama Region and Coquimbo Region.
- Té frío: A curiosity rather than a unique beverage. In the market of Angelmo, Puerto Montt, at a time when it was forbidden to serve alcohol, the white wine was served in a cup of tea instead of a glass to disguise the forbidden content.
- Vaina Chilena: A cocktail containing cognac, aged wine, egg yolk, cinnamon and sometimes cocoa liquor.
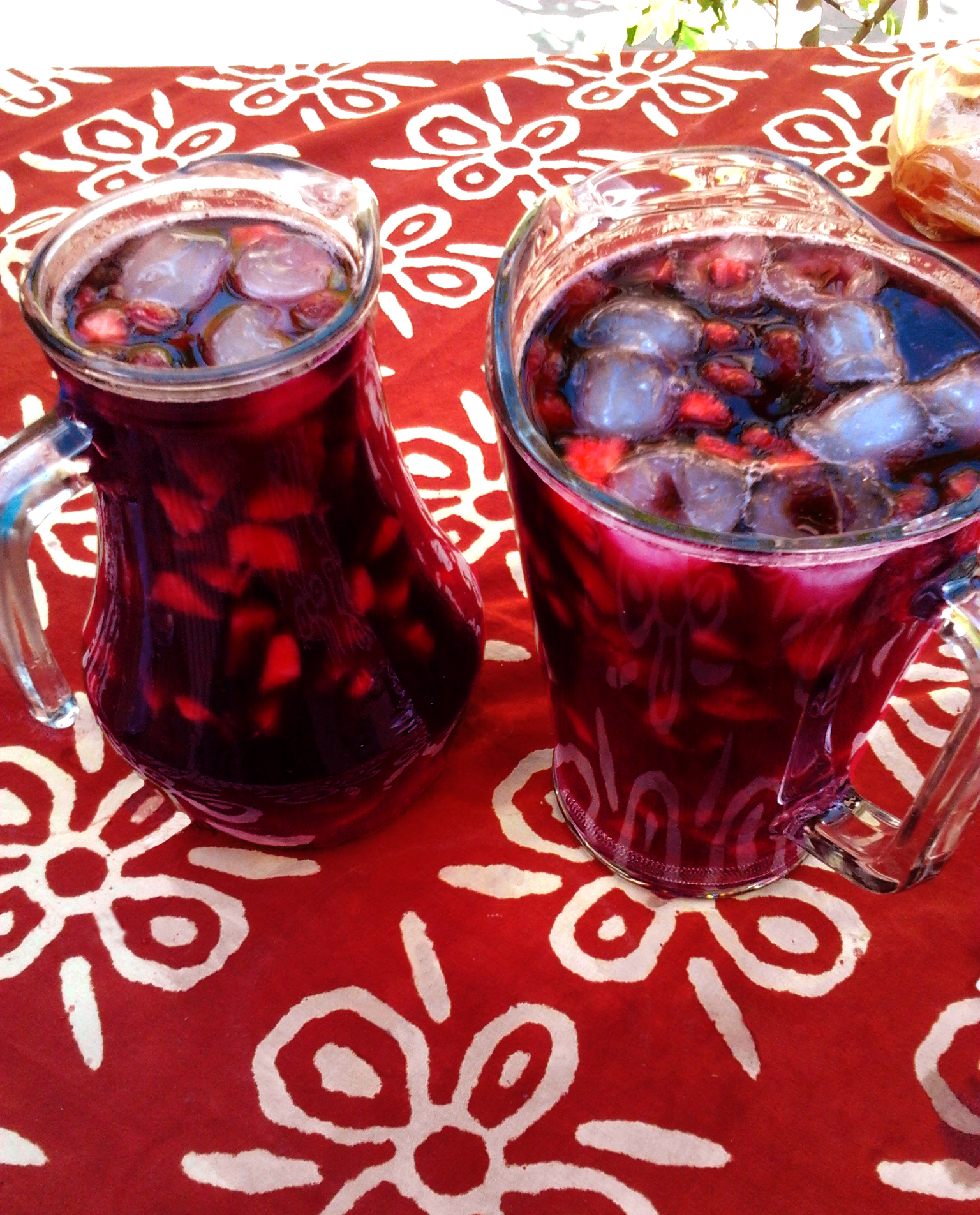
Borgoña

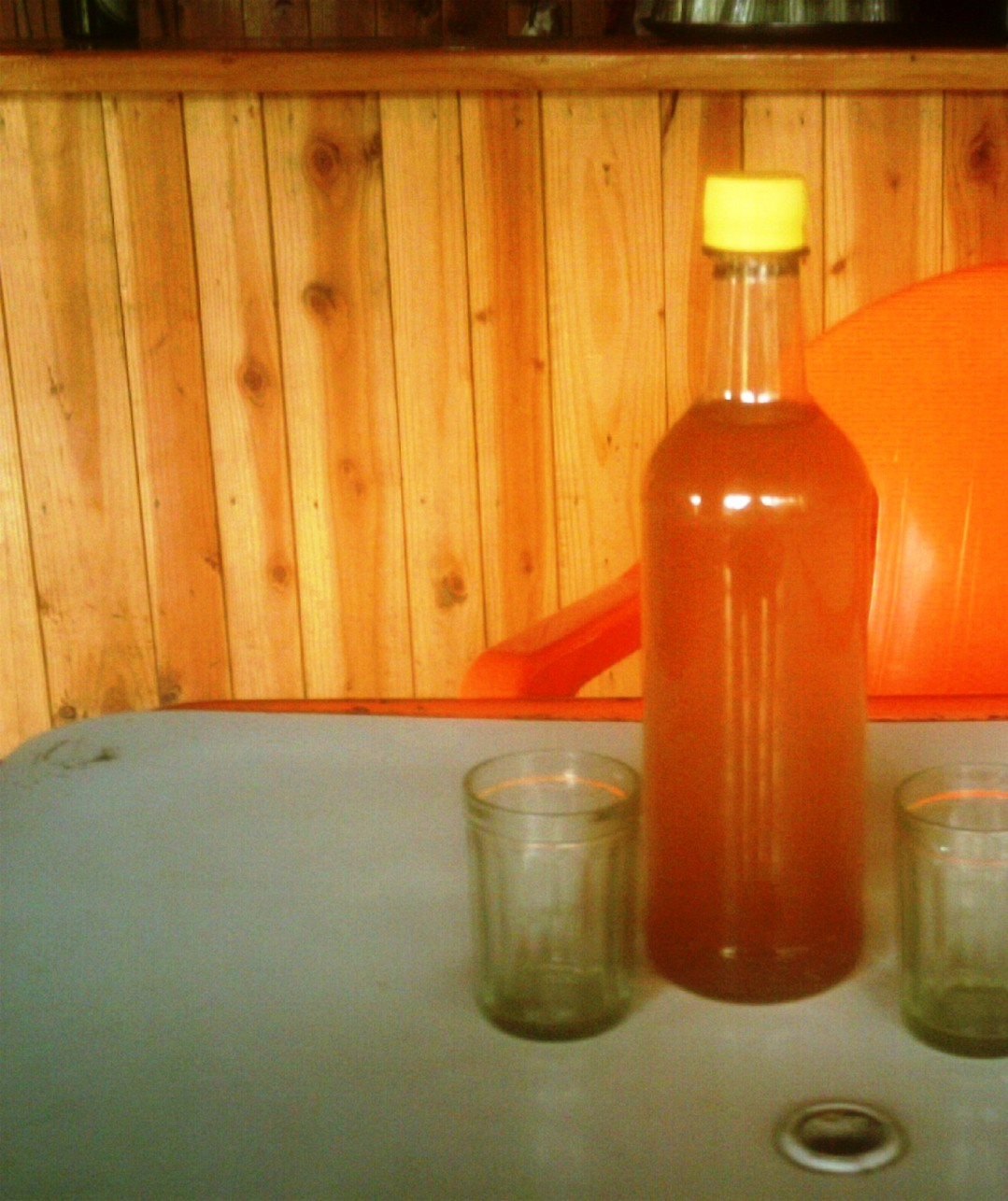
Chicha

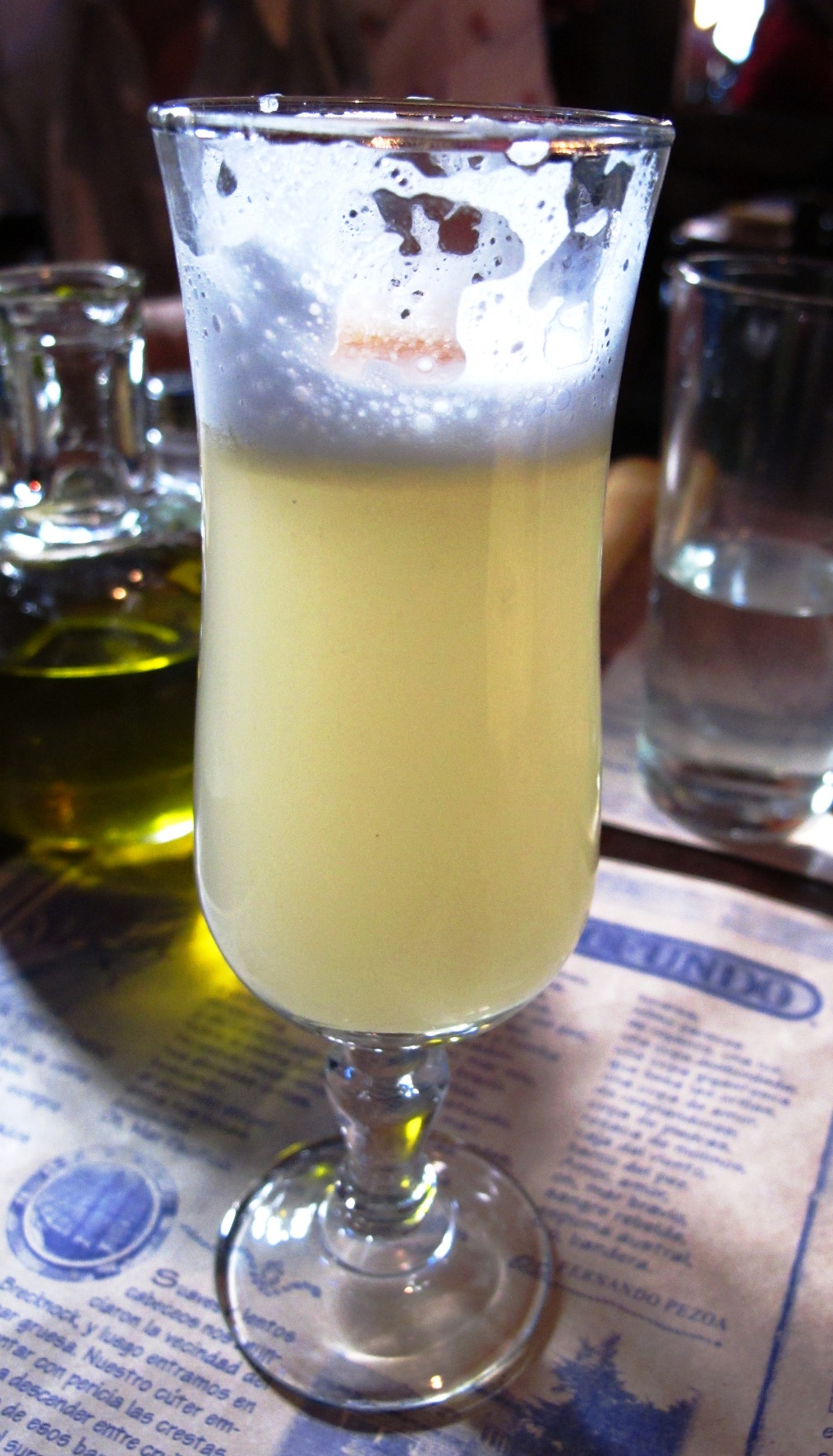
Chilean Pisco Sour

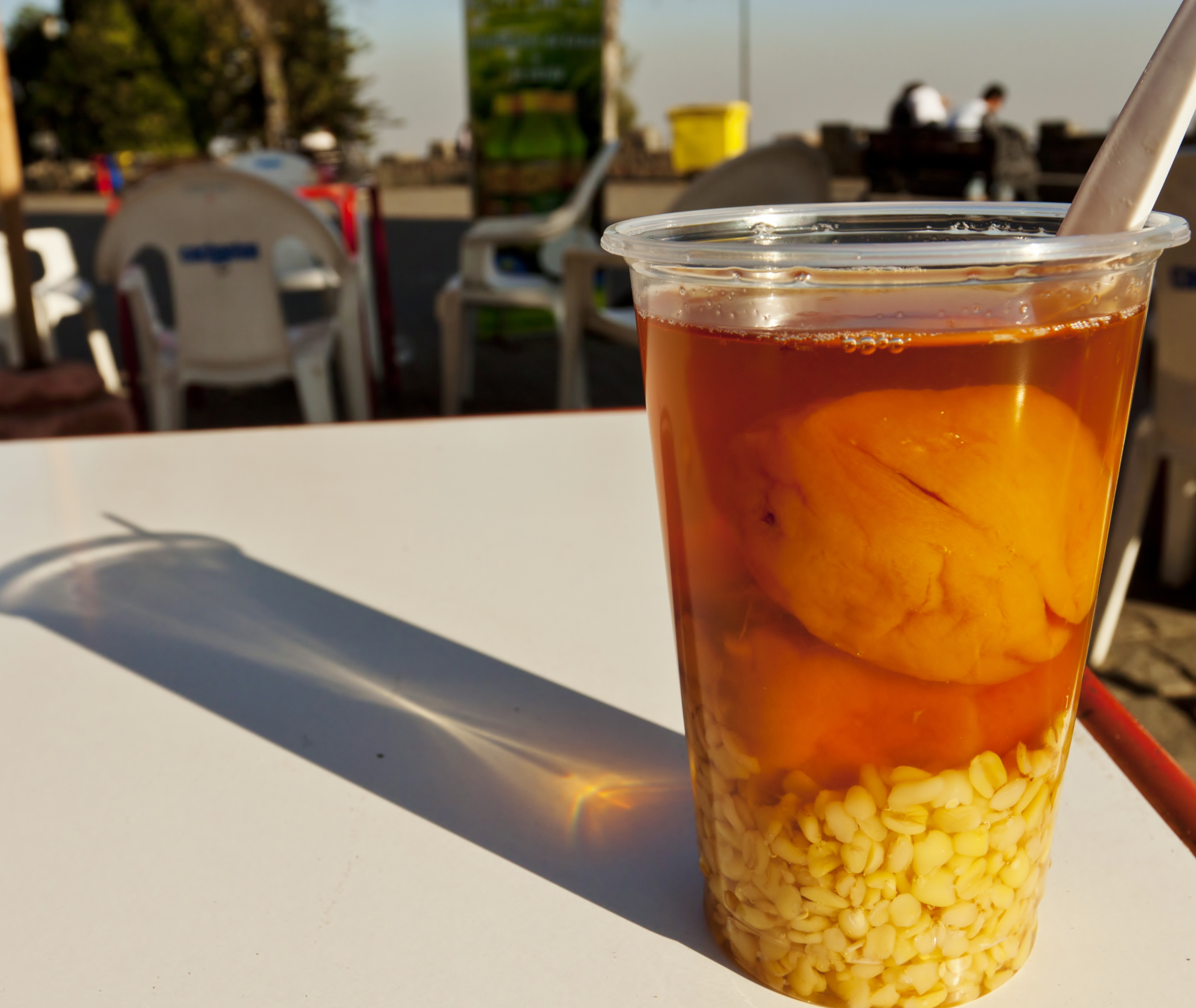
Mote con huesillo

Non-alcoholic beverages

- Ulpo: Toasted flour and water or milk.
- Leche con plátano: Fresh milk blended with banana and ice.
- Leche con lucuma: Fresh milk blended with lucuma and ice
- Mote con huesillo: Cooked dried peaches and fresh cooked husked wheat served as a drink. It can also be classified as a dessert.

=== Sandwiches and Chilean fast food ===
Beside the big fast food chains present in almost every country in the world, Chile has its own traditional “fast food”. The traditional empanada can be eaten at September independence day celebrations or as a quick lunch. The Chilean version of the hot dog is more complex than standard North American hotdogs: as well as mustard and ketchup, it can be topped with mashed avocado, chopped tomatoes, sauerkraut and home-made mayonnaise. During the cold winter, sopaipillas are also a popular snack served on the streets.

- Barros Jarpa: Grilled cheese and ham on white bun. Named after Chilean minister Ernesto Barros Jarpa.
- Barros Luco: Grilled cheese and meat on white bread. Named after the Chilean President Ramón Barros Luco (President from 1910 to 1915).
- Churrasco Italiano (Italian): Named after the colours of the Italian flag (red tomatoes, white mayonnaise and green mashed avocados), it is a beef sandwich topped with tomato, avocado and mayonnaise.
- Chacarero: like the normal churrasco, but with green beans and tomatoes.
- Choripán: chorizo or longaniza in bun, which in Chile is usually a piece of marraqueta.
- Completo: Hot dog with tomato, avocado, salsa Americana (a mashed mixture of gherkins, pickled carrots and onion) and sauerkraut (chucrut).
- Italiano: Hot dog with tomato, avocado and mayonnaise.
- Lomito Alemán (German): Pork sandwich topped with tomatoes, mayonnaise and sauerkraut; may contain sliced pickles.
- Sopaipilla
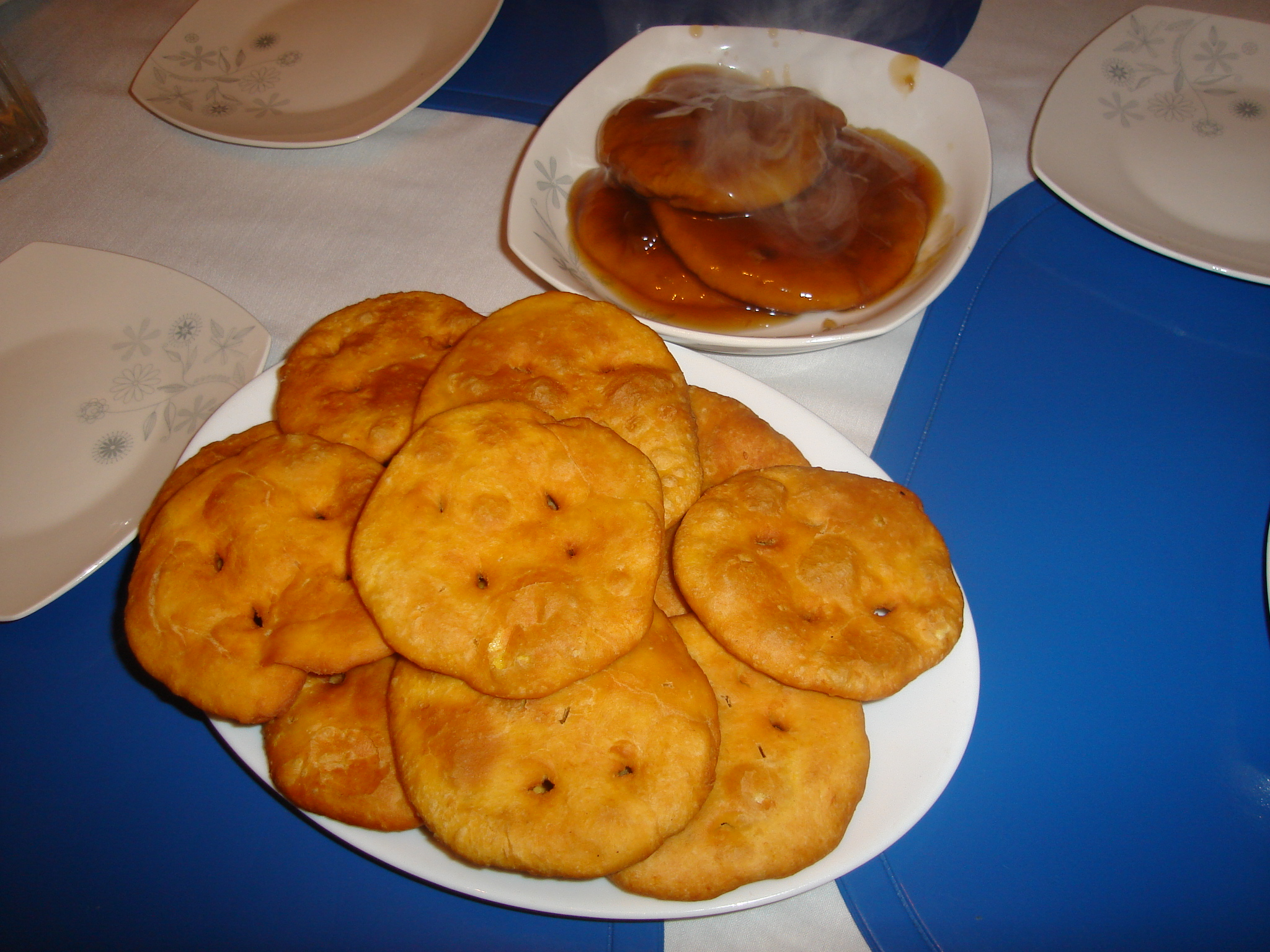
Sopaipillas, in background with chancaca

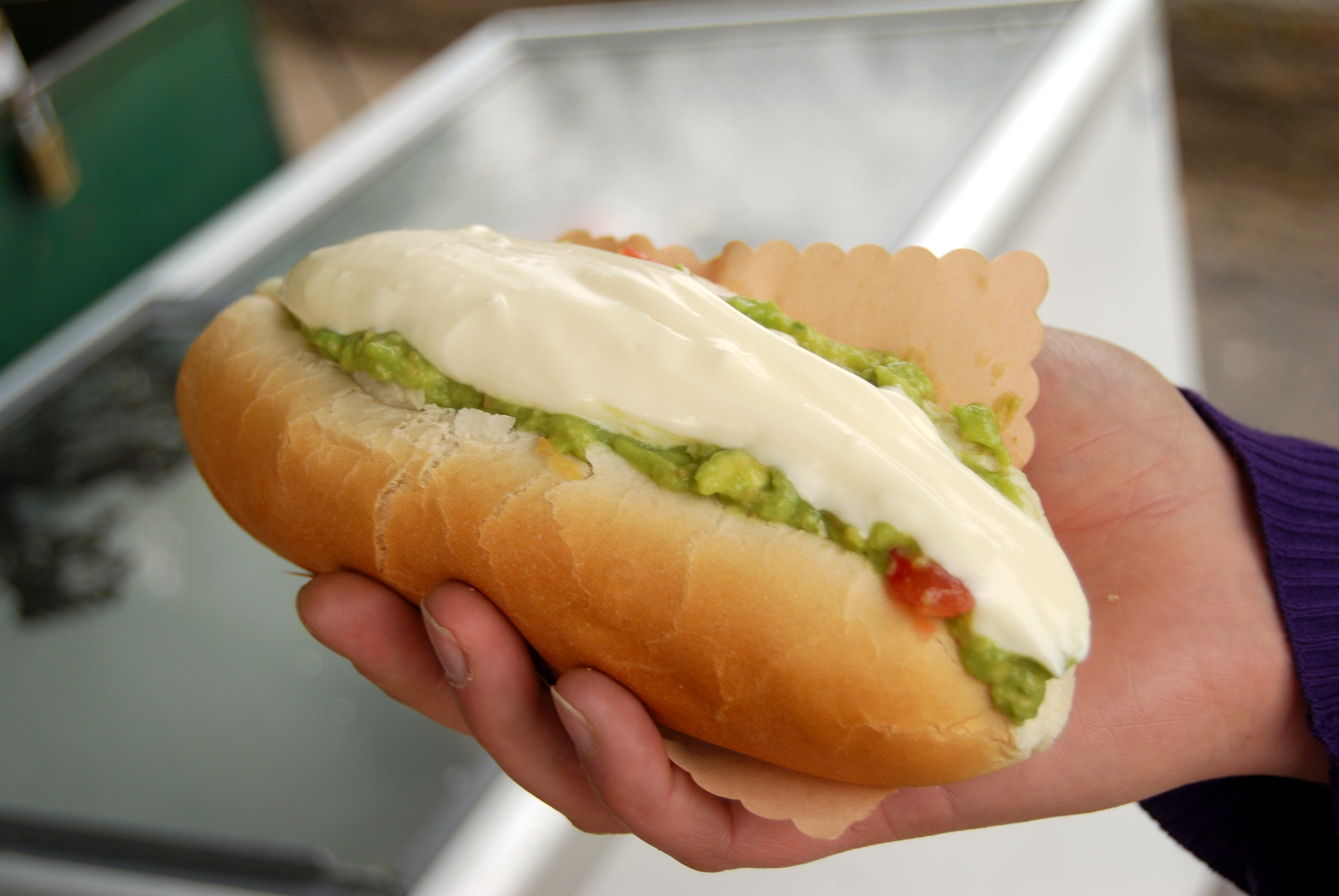
Completo italiano (Chilean hotdog)

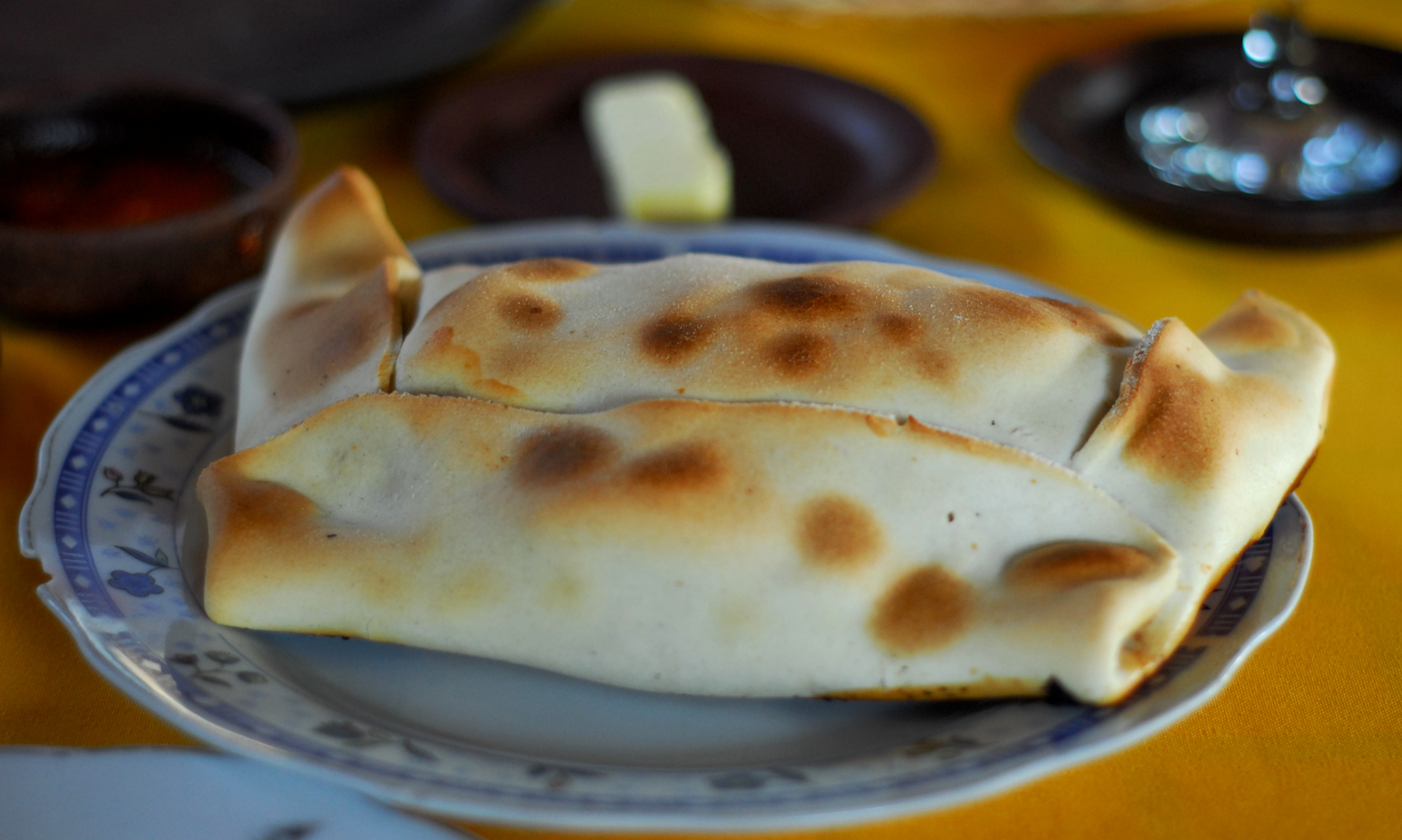
Empanadas

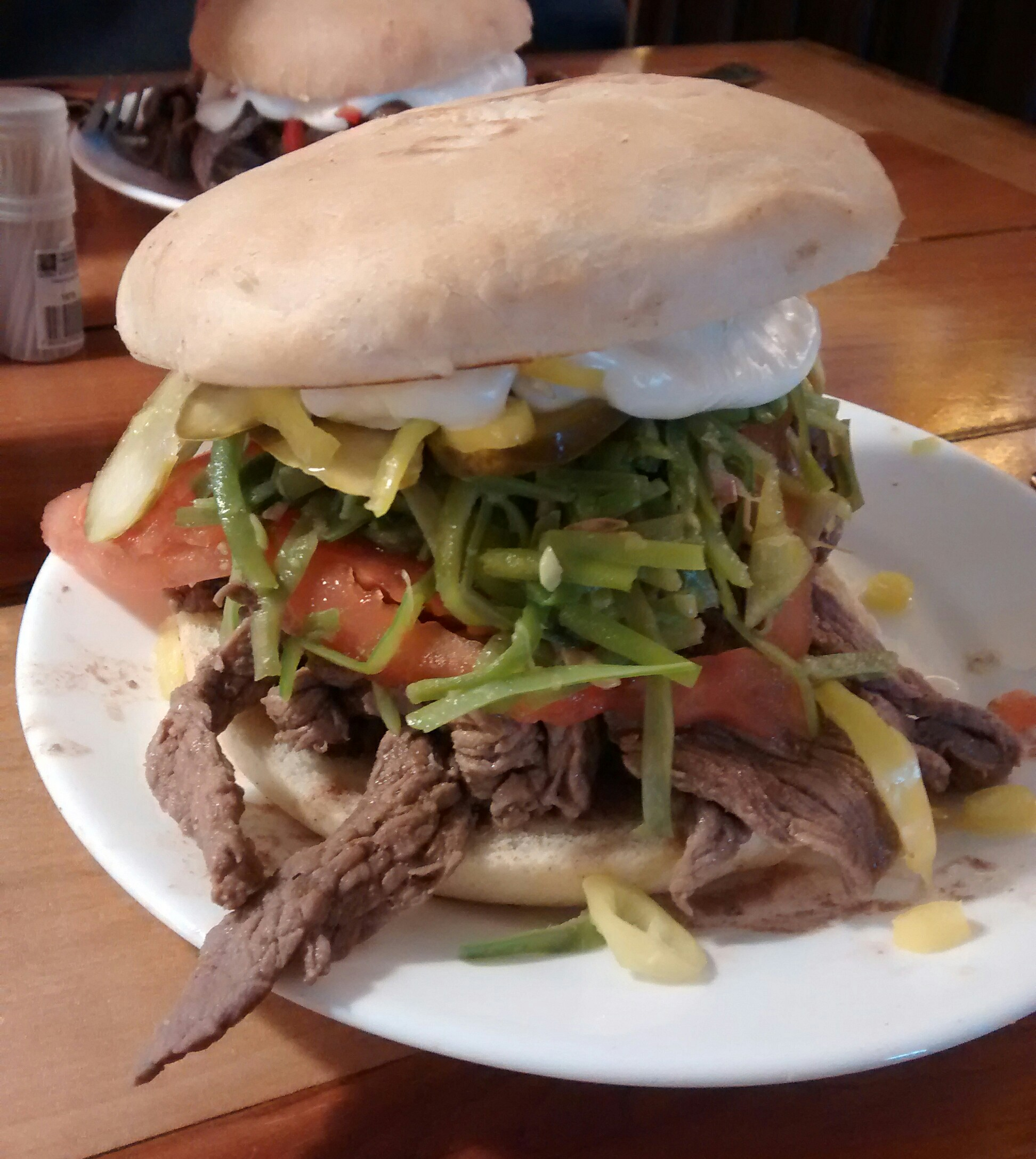
Chacarero, one of the most popular sandwiches

=== Starters and salads ===
- Ensalada Chilena
- Ensalada Chilena Nortina
- Ensalada de pencas
- Ensalada de apio: Celery salad, with the celery peeled chopped and seasoned with lemon, salt and olive oil. It can also contain boiled eggs.
- Panqueques verdes: Layered pancakes filled with vegetables.
- Zapallitos rellenos: Stuffed zucchini.
- Palta reina: Stuffed avocado.
- Tomates rellenos: Stuffed tomatoes.
- Tortilla de porotos verdes: Green bean tortilla.

=== Cereals and legumes ===
Legumes have been important in Chilean cuisine since pre-colonial times, with beans, lentils and chickpeas as part of a traditional diet and generally cooked with rice, fresh sweet corn or even pasta (Porotos con rienda)

- Garbanzos con arroz: Chickpeas with rice cooked in a stew.
- Porotos con riendas (literally, “beans with reins”): A stew of beans and spaghetti.
- Porotos Granados con mazamorra: fresh beans and ground fresh corn.
- Porotos Granados con pilco: Pilco is a mix of corn, tomato, onion, garlic, cumin, basil, green chilli, paprika and pumpkin.
- Lentejas con arroz: Stew of lentils and rice, usually accompanied by longaniza or chorizo.
- Arroz graneado: Rice is one of the most popular side dishes, in Chile is generally fried with a clove of garlic and carrot (Brunoise). It can also contain red peppers and onions.
- Arroz con huevo: Arroz graneado and fried eggs
- Choritos con arroz: Arroz graneado topped with mussels before the rise of fully cooked.

=== Pasta ===
Pasta is very common in everyday Chilean meals, but is not prepared very differently from in other countries, except for some changes in the name and forms of the pasta itself. Bolognese, white sauce (béchamel), and cream-based sauces are the most common.

=== Tortillas ===
- Croquetas de pescado: Fish cakes, generally made of tuna and called “croquetas de atun”.
- Fritos de coliflor: Cauliflower cakes
- Panqueques: Crepes, are usually eaten with Dulce de leche or Manjar, but they can also be a main course, layered with vegetables, or layered into a sweet cake.
- Tortilla: The basic flour and egg tortilla can be mixed with potatoes, cauliflower, peas, green beans, carrots, seafood and many other ingredients.
- Sopaipillas: can be also described as tortillas.
- Chapalele
- Milcao

=== Empanadas ===
Empanadas are common in many cultures with different names. In Chile, empanadas can have distinctive fillings and can also be cooked in unusual ways to give them a very distinctive flavour and shape. For this reason, empanada sellers in Chile (whether a restaurant, street stand, market, etc.) always specify if their empanadas are fried or baked.

- Empanadas: Can either be “de horno”, baked, or “fritas”, fried.

The most popular fillings are

- Pino (beef and onions)
- Cheese, and, more recently, ham and cheese.
- Seafood (mix of mussels, clams, and other molluscs).
- Onions, called Empanadas Pequenes.
- Prawns
- Cheese, basil and tomatoes.

=== Breads ===
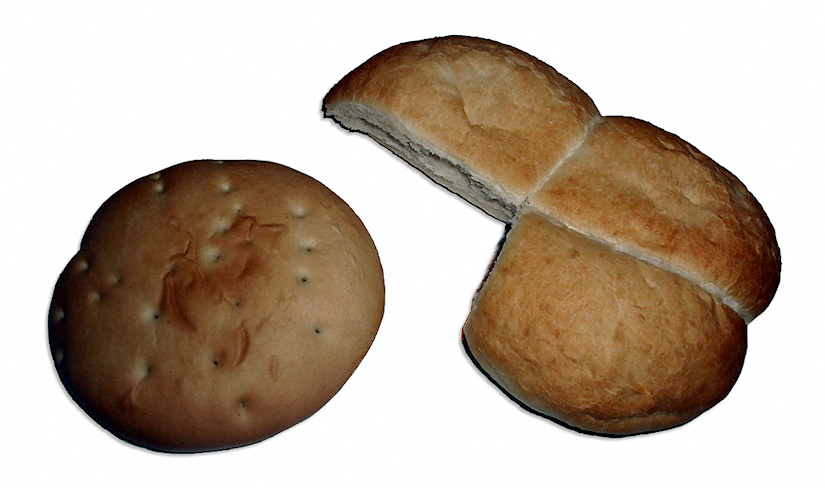
Chilean breads Hallulla and Marraqueta

Chile ranks among the highest per capita consumers of bread globally, second only to Germany. Bread is consumed throughout the day at breakfast, lunch (as a side or appetizer), las onces, and dinner. It is traditionally purchased fresh daily from local bakeries, particularly for service during onces.

Around the 1920s, a tin toaster was invented in Chile, also known as Chilean toaster, which over the years began to be used to heat bread, also due to the difficulty of toasting certain varieties (such as marraqueta) in electric toasters.

- Marraqueta, also called Pan Batido or Pan Frances: a staple in any home, marraqueta is a simple kind of bread which is characteristic for having a crispy crust and a soft, airy interior. Marraqueta and mashed avocado are the most common element in “las onces”.
- Hallulla
- Pan amasado
- Pan de huevo
- Coliza This bread is rectangular or diamond shaped with a flat top. The bread is made of layers and layers of dough and is easily pulled apart. It also looks like the bread is folded over and over.
- Dobladas, also called dobladitas: similar to colizas, made of fatty and heavy dough folded in triangles.
- Pan con chicharrones
- Tortilla de rescoldo

=== Salsas (sauces) ===
- Pebre
- Chancho en piedra
- Salsa verde: Parsley, onion, lemon juice and white vinegar, finely chopped or blended
- Salsa americana: Puréed gherkins, pickled onions, and pickled carrots

=== Meat dishes ===
Meat is very important in Chilean cuisine and for many Chileans it is essential ingredient in every dinner or lunch. According to studies, Chilean per capita meat consumption (including poultry, beef and pork) has doubled in the last two decades while seafood consumption has decreased.

- Cazuela: This soup/stew can contain poultry, beef, pork lamb or goat.
- Asado: Barbecues can also contain poultry, beef, pork lamb or goat.
- Carne al disco or asado al disco: meat prepared in a disc over a bonfire.

Poultry dishes

Chicken is the most common of the poultry meats and is an ingredient in traditional dishes like Asado, Pastel de choclo and Cazuela. Although in recent years turkey has become popular, it is not quite a tradition. Duck is rarely consumed in the centre and northern regions, but can be popular in southern countryside.

- Pollo arvejado: Chicken and pea casserole.
- Pollo al Cognac: Chicken stew slowly cooked with plenty of cognac and white wine.

Beef dishes

Although imported beef is available from other Latin American countries, Chileans prefer locally produced beef. Chilean cattle is fed with mineral-rich prairie grass and produced generally in small herds in small farms instead of being mass-produced and fattened on corn, as in some other countries. This produces leaner beef, but since it is the fat within the muscle tissue that makes beef tender, it also makes it tougher beef. Along with the previously mentioned asado, cazuela and empanadas, other Chilean beef dishes include:

- Niños envueltos (literally, “wrapped children”): This peculiarly-named dish contains vegetables and other ingredients wrapped in thin sliced beef.
- Crudos
- Lomo a lo pobre/Bistec a lo pobre: Beef (steak or loin respectively) with fries, fried onions and fried eggs.
- Tapapecho a la cacerola: Tapapecho casserole, similar to spare ribs; also known as Pescetto.
- Chorrillana
- Carne mechada
- Arrollado de Malaya

Pork dishes

- Costillar de chancho: A whole rack of pork ribs, roasted in the oven or barbecue.
- Arrollado de chancho and Arrollado Huaso
- Queso de cabeza (literally, “head cheese”):A kind of pudding with a jelly consistency made from the soft parts of a pig's head.
- Longaniza
- Chorizo
- Chicharron Fried pieces of meat and fat.
- Prietas con Papas Cocidas: a blood sausage with boiled potatoes.
- Estofado de chancho: Pork stew.
- Patas de chancho Rebozadas: Pork feet boiled with herbs, accompanied by pebre and bread.
- Pernil con papas cocidas: Roasted pork leg with boiled potatoes, and usually accompanied by sauerkraut.

=== Lamb and goat dishes ===
This rich meat is not commonly eaten in much of Chile but it is very popular in Patagonia among both local people and tourists.

- Cordero al palo: Another characteristic dish of the southern regions - a lamb roasted on a stake over a bonfire. In the northern regions, similar dishes are prepared but with young goats, called cabritos.

Rabbit dishes

- Conejo escabechado is probably the most popular rabbit dish. The rabbit is cooked in a casserole with oil, vinegar, onions and garlic.

Rabbit can also be prepared as:

- Conejo al horno: Roasted
- Estofado de conejo: Stewed

=== Intestinos (offal) dishes ===
- Criadillas: Bull testicles
- Guatitas: Beef stomach
- Lengua con salsa tártara: Beef tongue
- Panitas: Liver
- Bistec de Panitas: Liver steak
- Riñones al Jerez (wine): Kidney and sherry
- Ubres asadas: Udders quickly roasted
- Queso de cabeza (head cheese): A kind of pudding with a jelly consistency made from the soft parts of a pig's head.

=== Various stews ===
- Ajiaco
- Carbonada
- Guiso de acelga: Chard stew
- Charquicán
- Charquicán de cochayuyo

=== Fish and shellfish ===
Chileans enjoy all kinds of seafood, sometimes prepared raw with lemon, coriander and onions, or just simply in the shell with lemon juice and a glass of white wine. Seafood markets are commonly found in fishing villages.

Fish

- Reineta a la plancha: Grilled reineta
- Caldillo de congrio
- Caldillo de pescado: like caldillo de congrio, but made with any other fish.
- Pescado frito: Deep-fried buttered fish; can be congrio, merluza or others.
- Ceviche
- Corvina al horno: A whole corvina stuffed with cheese, tomatoes and longaniza, baked.
- Smoked salmon
- Jurel: Eaten in salad or as a cheaper substitute for tuna.

Shellfish

- Almejas al matico
- Camarón de mar
- Camarón de río (Caridea)
- Cangrejo or Jaiba: can be prepared in a pie made of the crab carcass, as pie filling, steamed, or even roasted in a barbecue.
- Centolla
- Choritos (mussels) en salsa verde
- Choros zapato (mussels): “Shoe mussels” are like normal mussels but bigger (shoe size).
- Langostas de Juan Fernández (lobsters from Juan Fernández Islands)
- Oysters
- Scallops
- Piures
- Picorocos
- Empanada de mariscos: Seafood empanadas
- Machas a la parmesana: Baked with Parmesan cheese and white wine.
- Choritos al vapor: Steamed mussels
- Chupe de mariscos
- Consomé de locos
- Locos Chilean abalone
- Mariscal
- Pastel de jaibas: Crab pie
- Cholgas al Alicate: Stuffed mussel shells wired closed.
- Chupe de locos: Crab or any other seafood can be used in this recipe.
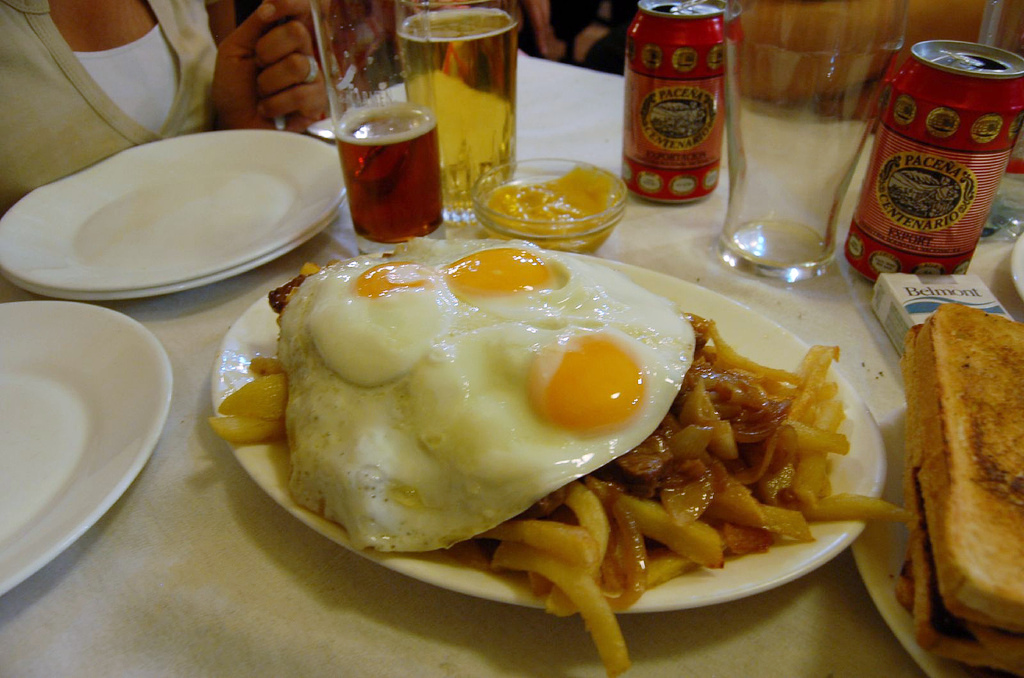
Chorrillana

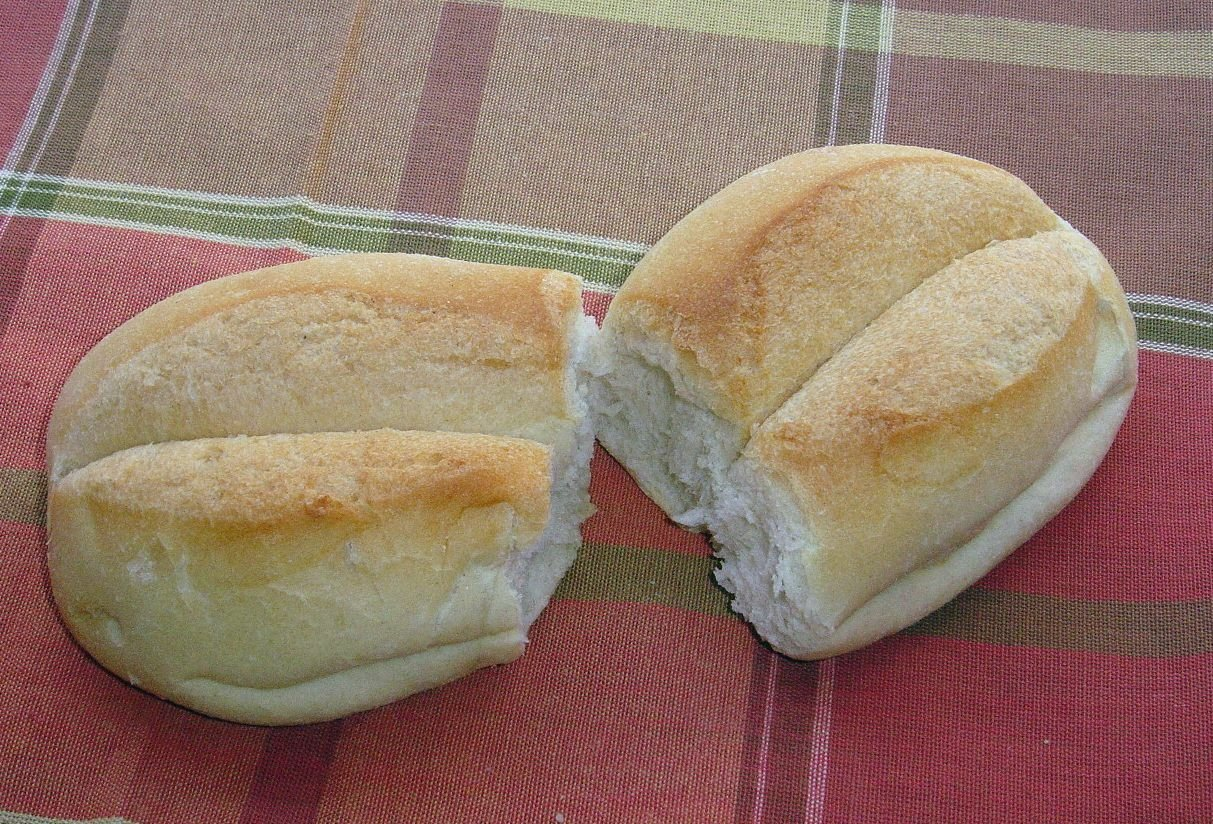
Marraqueta, one of the favourite breads among Chileans.

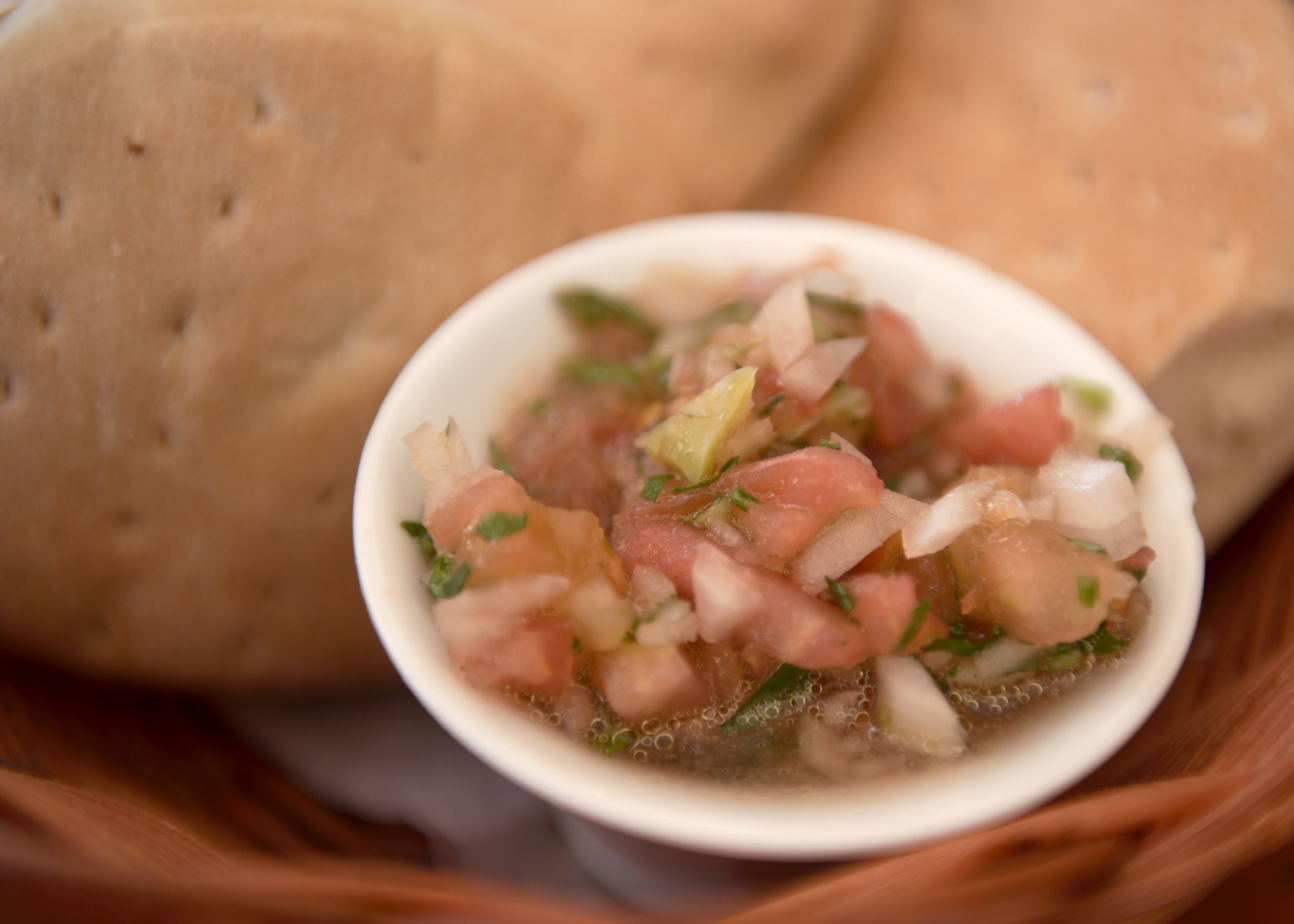
Pebre and bread is served on the table before the meal at most restaurants in Chile.

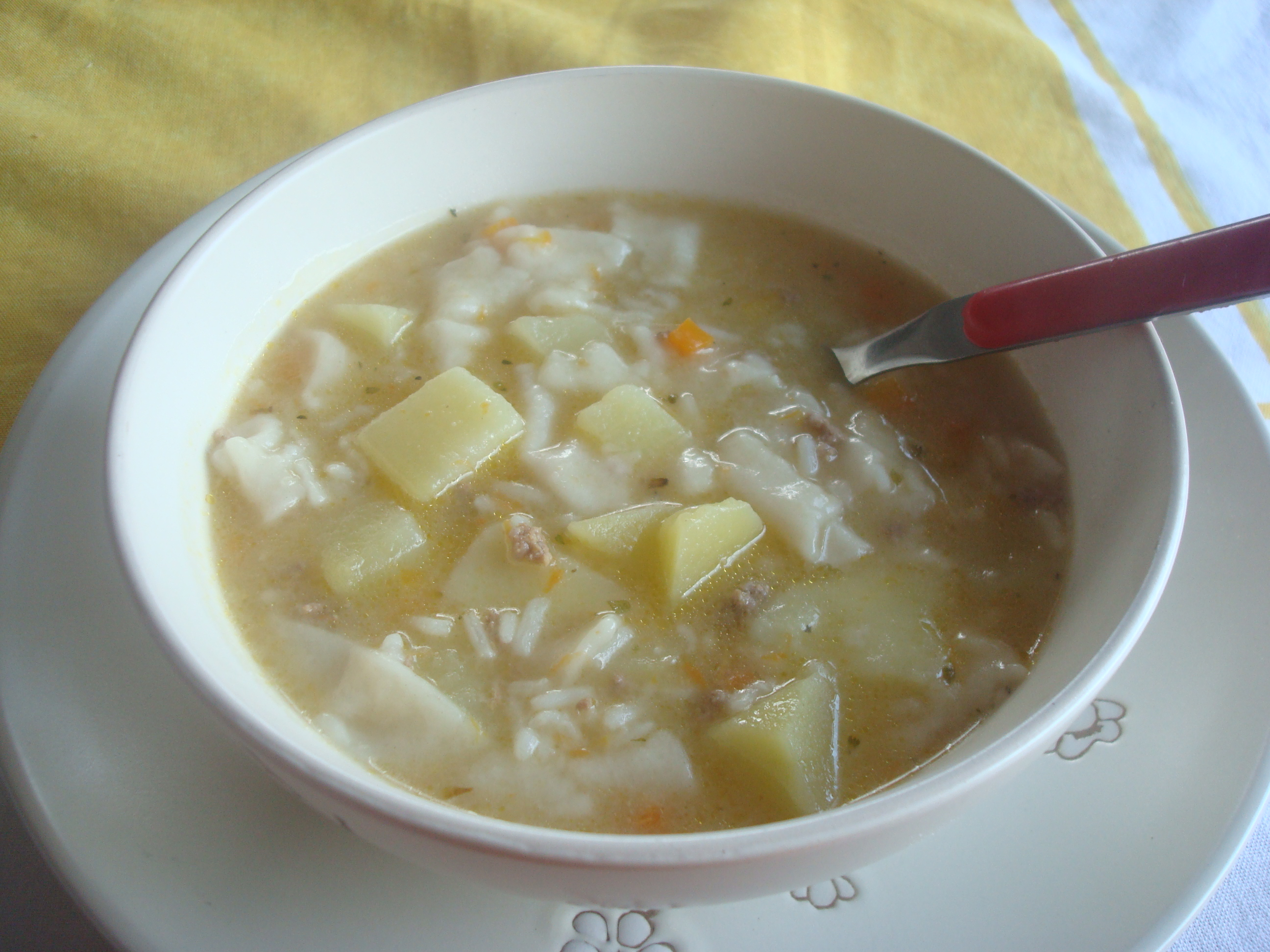
Pantrucas and beef soup

== Sweets, cakes, and desserts ==
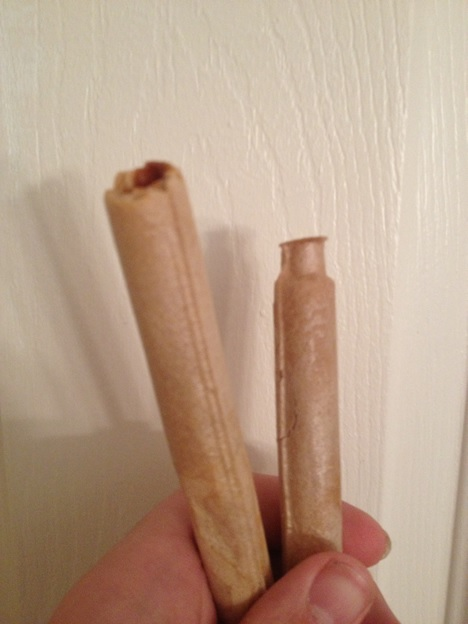
Two cuchuflíes.

There are many different kinds of cakes in Chile and home baking is a popular alternative to the bakery. These are the most common varieties:

In Chile, most desserts and sweets include dulce de leche, which is referred to as manjar

- Alfajor: A kind of cookie filled with manjar.
- Tortas: Sponge cakes in layers, filled with whipped cream, creme patissiere, Dulce de leche and fruit. The sponge should be very light and moist, and can be covered with more whipped cream or meringue. This is the most common type of cake for birthdays.
- Empolvados: A small pastry consisting of two small, spongy cakes covered in powdered sugar with manjar in between.
- Queques: A heavier and drier cake, with no layers and usually covered in icing sugar.
- Pasteles: Like a torta but smaller in size, usually square.
- Tartaletas: Like a pie covered in fruit.
- Torta tres leches
- Pan de huevo
- Cuchuflí: A spongy pastry tube, filled with manjar.
- Barquillo: The cone from an ice cream cone.
- Berlines
- Kuchen
- Pie de Limon: Lemon pie

== See also ==
- List of Chilean ingredients
- Rincón Chileno
