= Pichanga (dish) =

Traditional dish in Chile

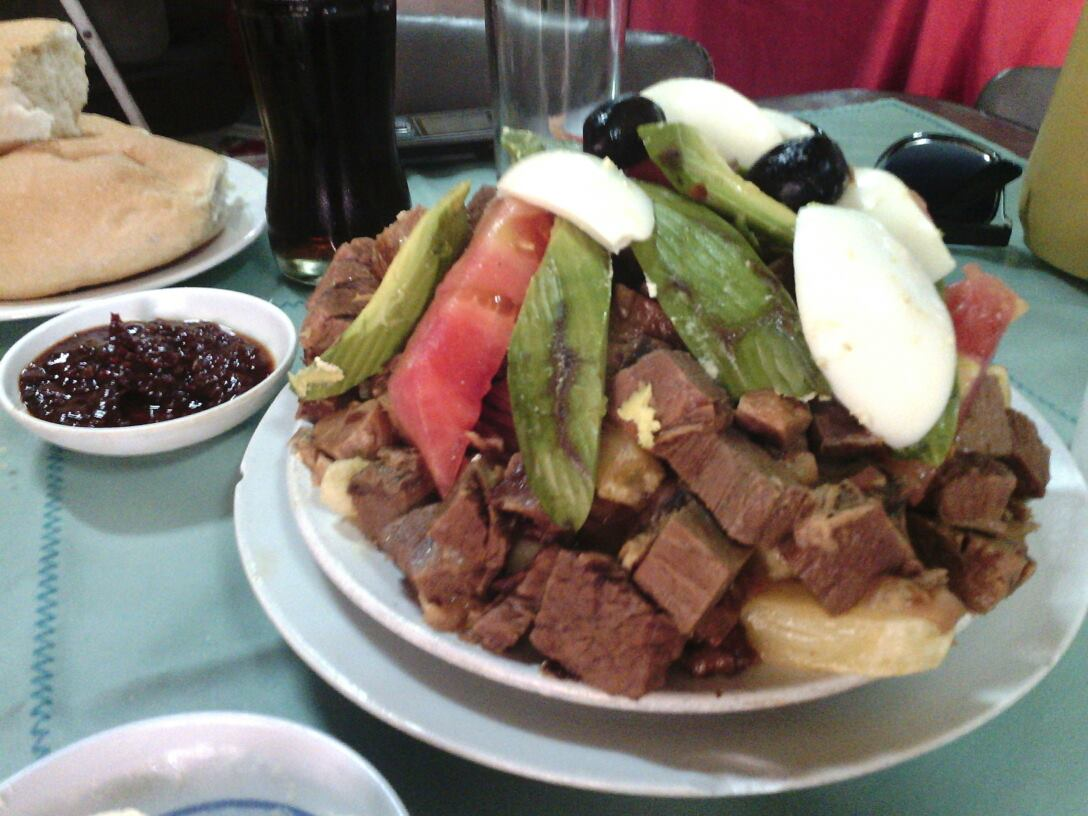
Pichanga

Pichanga is a Chilean dish consisting of a mixture of pickled food items, small pieces of ham, different types of cheese, olives, and salami. All cooked in vinegar, canola oil, and several spices, as well as (in some cases) hot dog and sausage pieces, chunks of meat, and other 'delectable' items.

Pichanga Caliente, often confused with Chorrillana-French fries, beef strips, fried onions, and fried eggs- consists of mix of chips (fries in the US), fried meat, beef, chicken and/or pork, topped with a variety of vegetables, from pickles to tomatoes, often on a plate large enough to share.
