= Murtado =

Liqueur from southern Chile

Murtado (from Murta the Spanish name for Ugni molinae or Chilean guava) is a typical liqueur from southern Chile where the endemic Chilean guava grows. It is made by conserving fruit inside a bottle with aguardiente for some weeks and then mixing it with syrup.
