= Porotos con riendas =

Chilean dish

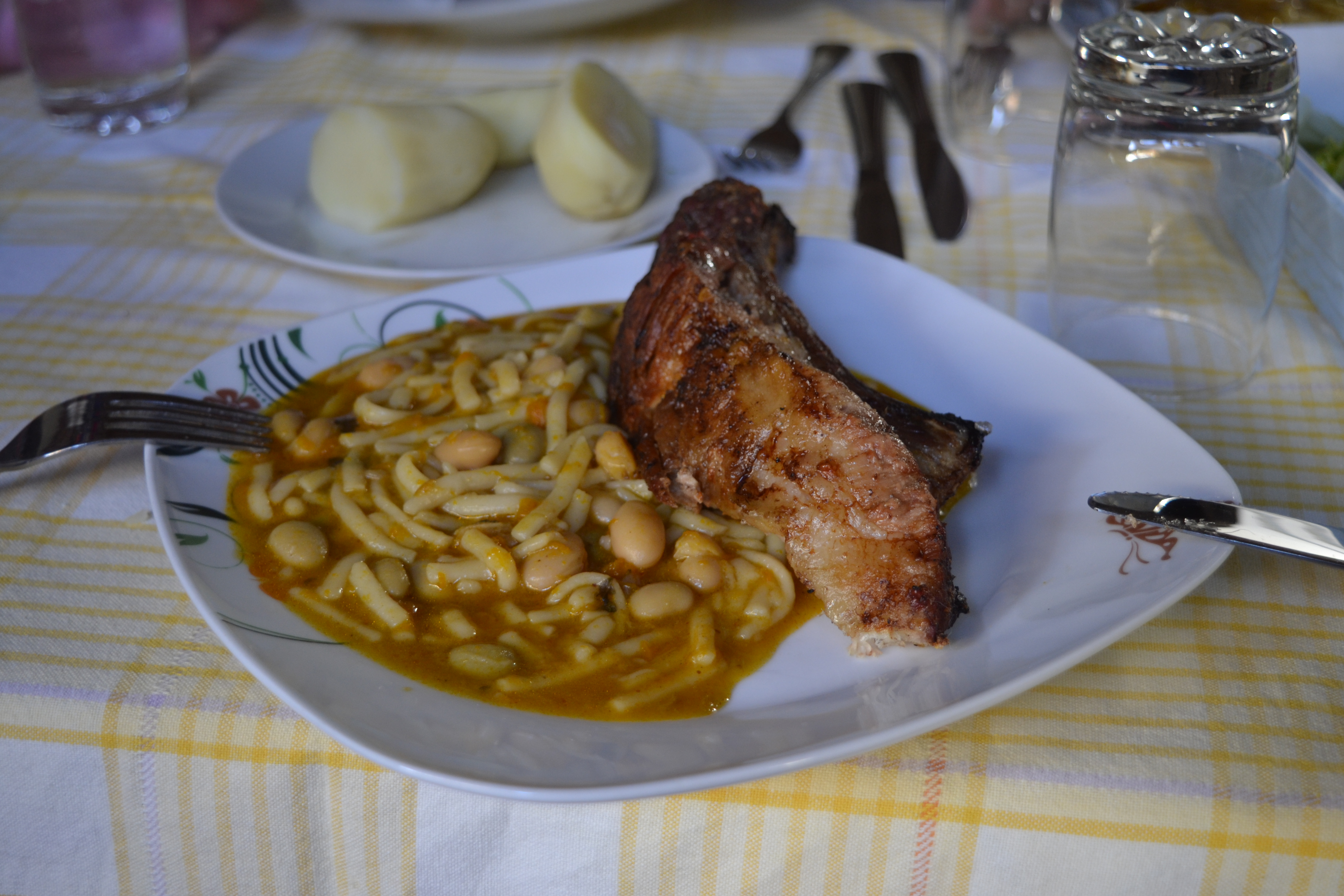
- Porotos con rienda, here served with roast pork
- Place of origin: Chile
- Serving temperature: Hot
- Main ingredients: Spaghetti, beans

Porotos con rienda (English: beans with reins) is a typical Chilean dish made of boiled beans with spaghetti, chorizo, diced pumpkin, chili, and onions. It is considered a traditional winter meal.
