= Salsa americana =

Chilean relish

- A Chilean completo topped with tomato, sauerkraut and salsa americana (Pickles, pickled carrot and pickled onion).
- Alternative names: Americana
- Type: Relish
- Place of origin: Chile
- Serving temperature: Chilled
- Main ingredients: Pickles, pickled carrot, pickled onion

Salsa americana, also known as americana, is a Chilean relish made from a finely chopped or blended mixture of pickles, pickled carrots and pickled onions. One typically finds this condiment topped on a traditional completo; along with tomato, sauerkraut (chucrut), and mayonnaise.
