= Pantruca =

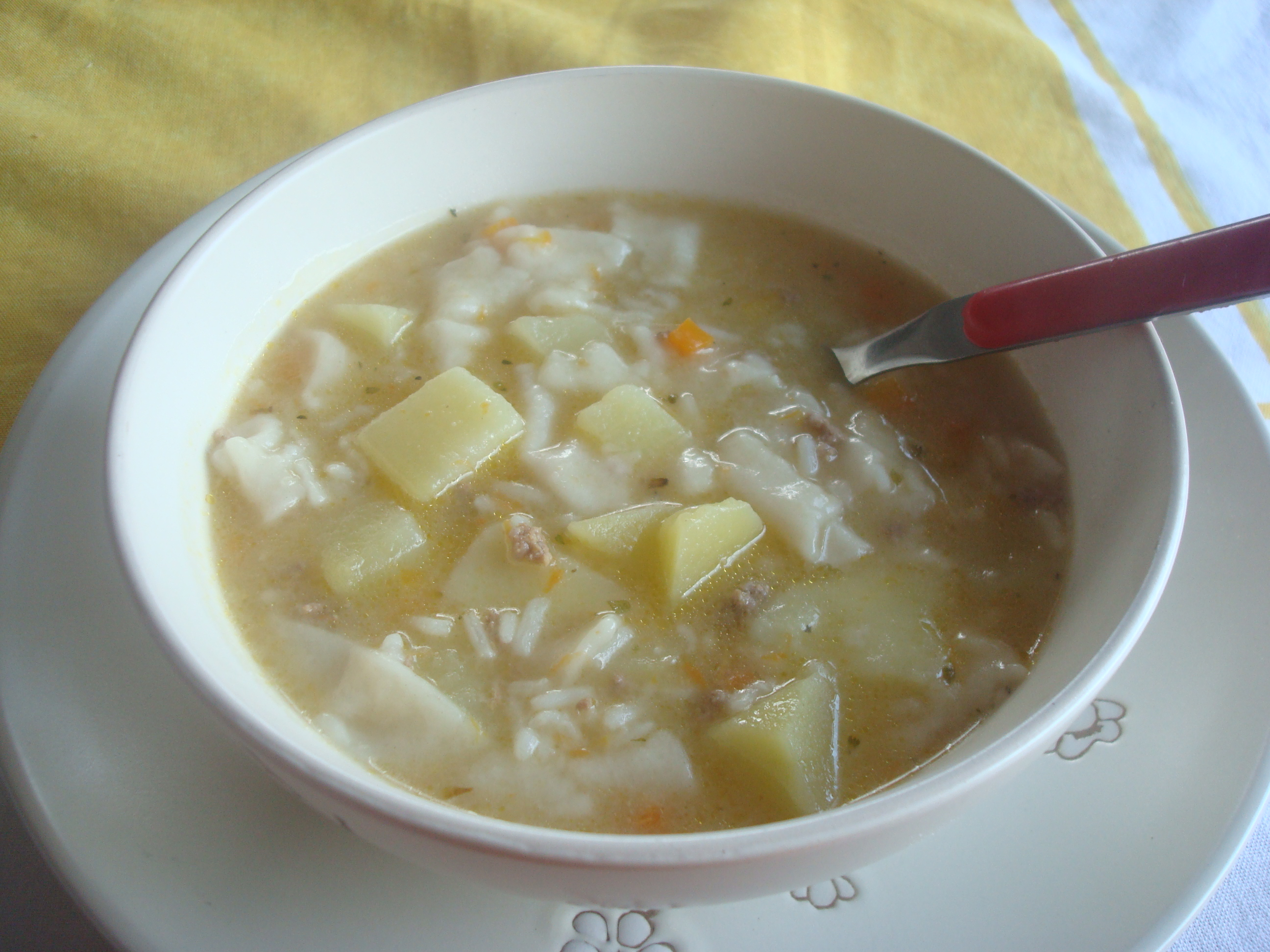
- Pantrucas in beef stock
- Type: Dumpling
- Place of origin: Chile
- Main ingredients: Flour, water, oil

Pantruca, is a typical food of Chile made with flour. It is a type of dumpling whose dough is made with water, flour and a bit of oil, cut in irregular pieces and later mixed with vegetable soup or beef stock.
