= Cabeza =

Mexican dish of beef head

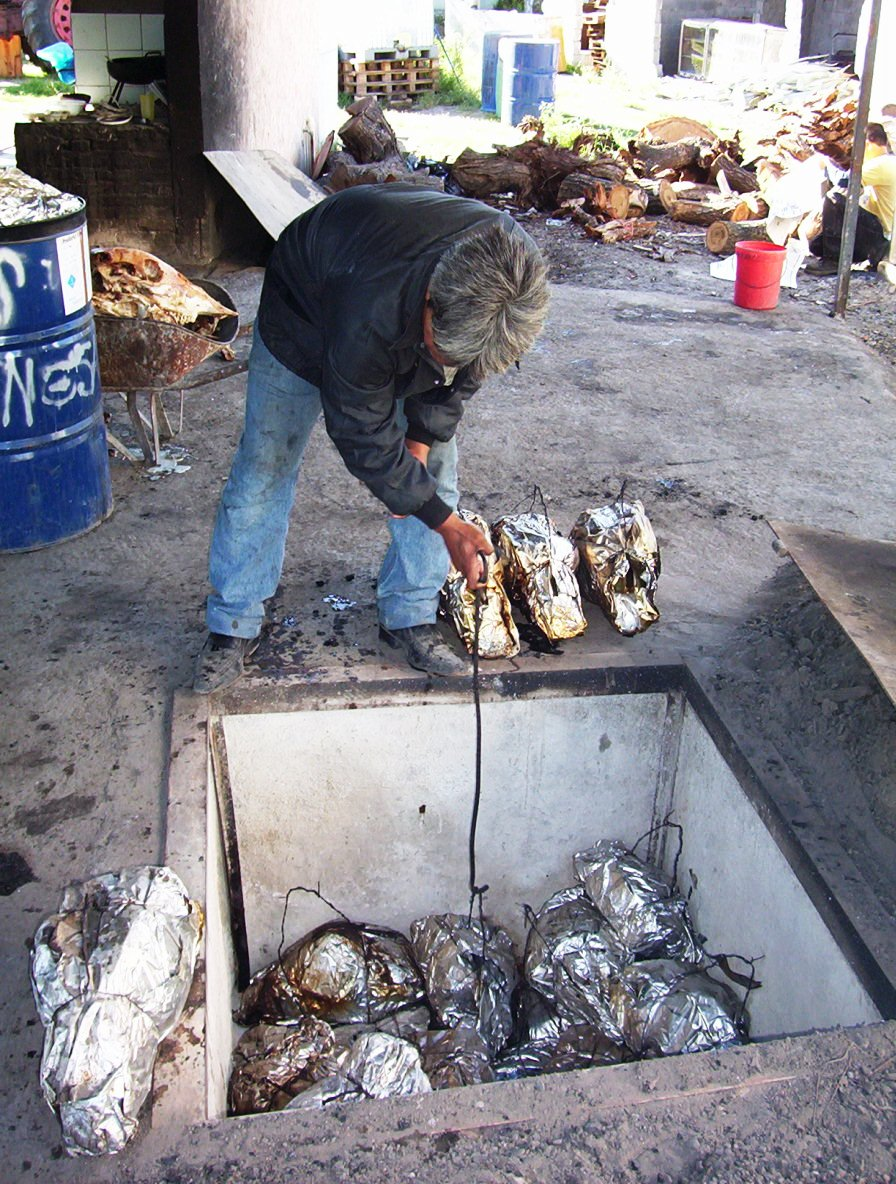
Beef heads, wrapped in aluminum foil, cooked in barbacoa.

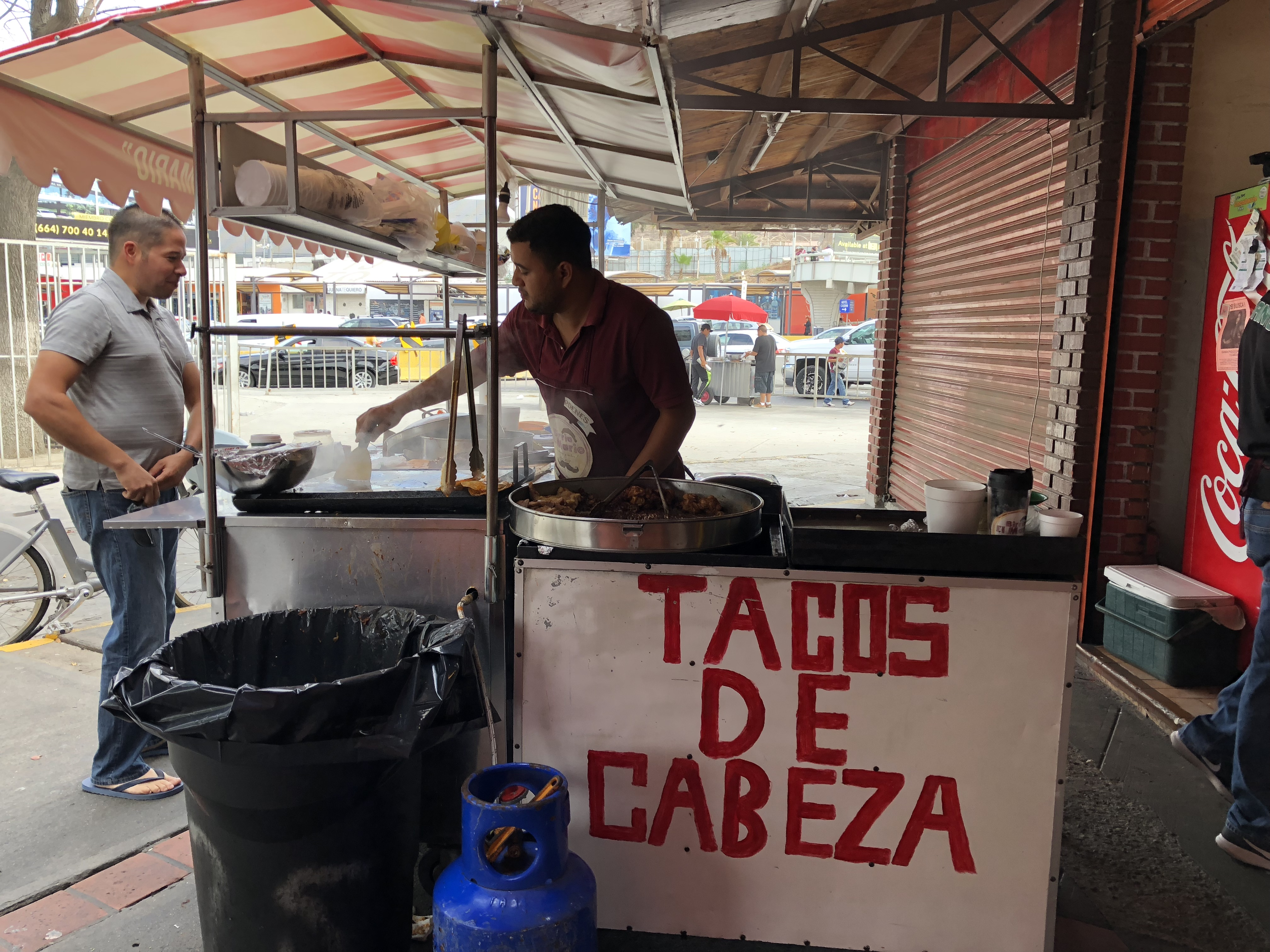
A taco stand advertising tacos de cabeza in Tijuana, Mexico

In Mexican cuisine, cabeza (lit. 'head'), from barbacoa de cabeza, is the meat from a roasted beef head, served as taco or burrito fillings. It typically refers to barbacoa de cabeza or beef-head barbacoa, an entire beef-head traditionally roasted in an earth oven, but now done in steamer or grill.

When sold in restaurants, customers may ask for particular parts of the body meats they favor, such as ojo (eye), oreja (ear), cachete (cheek), lengua (tongue), sesos (brains), or labios (lips).

== History ==
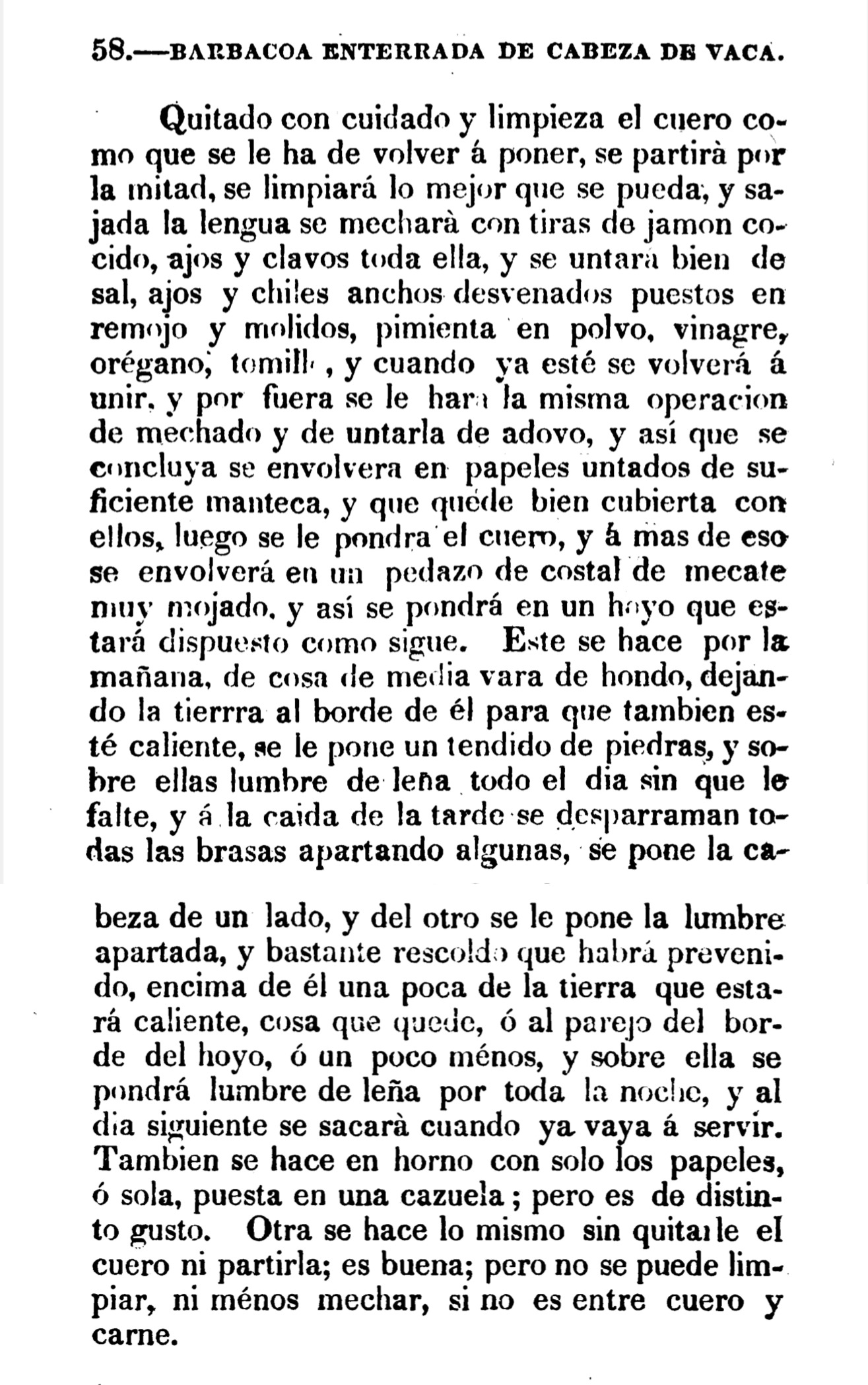
A Barbacoa de Cabeza recipe from 1836, from the Mexican cookbook “Nuevo y Sencillo Arte de Cocina, Repostería y Refrescos” by Antonia Carrillo.

Barbacoa in Mexico, refers to the local indigenous variation of the primitive method of cooking in a pit or earth oven. It generally refers to slow-cooking meats or whole sheep, whole cows, whole beef heads, or whole goats in a hole dug in the ground covered with agave (maguey) leaves, although the interpretation is loose, and in the present day (and in some cases) may refer to meat steamed until tender. This meat is known for its high fat content and strong flavor, often accompanied with onions and cilantro (coriander leaf).

The most common barbacoa prepared and consumed all across Mexico is barbacoa de res (beef barbacoa). In many regions, especially in southern Mexico and along the Gulf Coast, entire cow barbacoa is prepared. But the most common, and one of the oldest, is barbacoa de cabeza, or beef-head barbacoa.

Barbacoa de cabeza, also known as Cabeza guateada in Argentina and Paraguay and berarubu (or “cabeça de boi assada no chão”) in Brazil, consists in roasting an entire cow head, including tongue and brains, in an earth oven. After being cleaned and seasoned, the beef-head is wrapped either in maguey or banana leaves, or in a burlap sack. Then it is traditionally buried in a hole in the ground that had been previously prepared and heated with fire. The head will remain cooking in this natural oven for up to 15 hours.

A type of offal, eating beef or calf’s head was once a mainstream and highly prized dish all across the Western World up until the early 20th century. This typical dish made its way to the Americas, including the United States, and to Mexico where it was done in the traditional barbacoa.

Besides being a highly prized, mainstream dish, another reason why Barbacoa de cabeza was prepared in Mexico and South America was out of the need to use every part of the cow after slaughtering it for tasajo. In 18th and 19th century Mexico, and Latin America, most of the beef consumed was dried salted beef known as “tasajo” (or cecina). After slaughtering a cow, most of the flesh was salted and dried, with the exception of the lomo (loin, ribs), organs, and head. Typically, the lomo, ribs, and the organs, like the tripas, were roasted al pastor style (spit roasted), while the head was cooked in barbacoa. Mexican folklorist and historian, Leopoldo Bello López, explains the process:

“. . . an unbranded bull, about four years old, preferring death than losing its freedom, choked itself to death when it was lassoed. Without saying anything, three of the young vaqueros went to it to remove the hide, dismember it and bring it to camp. That night there would be a great feast: pieces of liver, kidneys and the loin on the spit over an open fire and the rest would be sliced and salted, and the head cooked in "barbacoa" in a hole made in the ground, that the next day would become a meal fit for kings.”

19th century recipes for Barbacoa de Cabeza are common and appear in many Mexican cookbooks of that time. In her cookbook —Nuevo y Sencillo Arte de Cocina, Repostería y Refrescos (1836)— Antonina Carrillo includes two barbacoa de cabeza recipes, one in which the head, after being seasoned, is wrapped with its own skin, and another one in which the skin is left on. In Mariano Galvan Rivera’s —Diccionario de Cocina o el Nuevo Cocinero Mexicano en Forma de Diccionario (1845)— includes many recipes for barbacoa including one for barbacoa de cabeza.

=== Folk history ===
An often repeated and unsubstantiated story among the Chicanos and Tejanos is that barbacoa de cabeza was invented in Texas, specifically in the South of the state, by Tejano vaqueros (cowboys) who were supposedly paid by their Anglo bosses by giving them the unwanted parts, the offal, of the slaughtered cattle, ignoring the fact that barbacoa de cabeza has a long history throughout Mexico and South America. The story holds that such items as the head, the entrails, and meat trimmings such as the skirt were the origin of not only dishes like barbacoa de cabeza (head barbecue), but also dishes such as menudo (tripe soup) and fajitas or arracheras (grilled skirt steak), which they also claim to have invented. The hypothesis holds that such dishes were only known to South Texas.

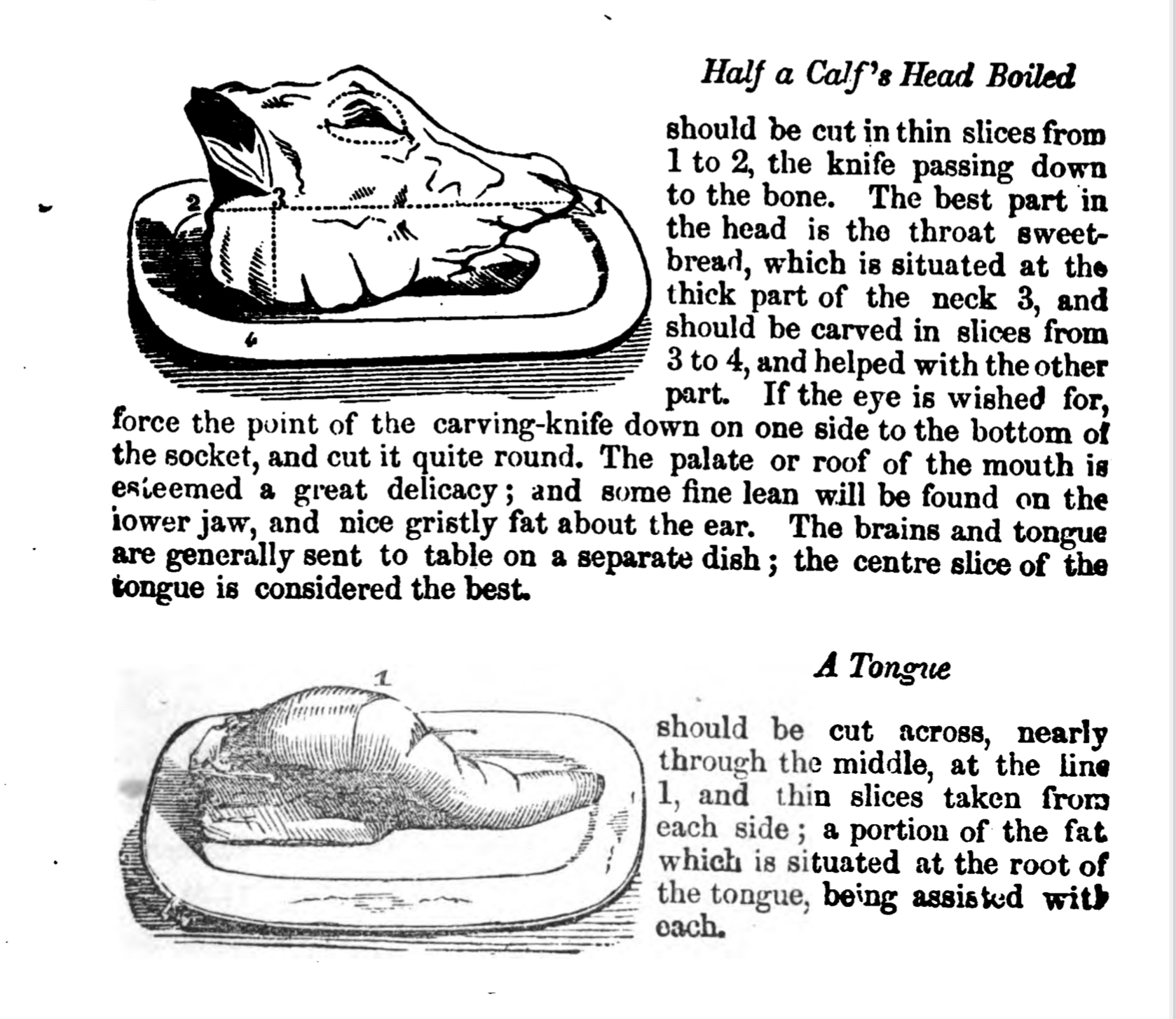
Boiled calf’s head and tongue, from the American cookbook “The American Home Cook Book” (1854). Beef head, tongue, sweetbreads, and brain, used to be a mainstream and highly prized dish in American cuisine.

This story is extensively repeated and widely accepted by the American public, including scholars and writers. Some even go so far as to claim that the rich Texas ranchers were starving the Tejano population to death. But while it’s a widely accepted story, it has no evidence to support it. On the contrary, evidence shows that Tejanos were the ones giving away the calf heads and sweetbreads to Anglo-American and European arrivals to Texas in the 19th century as they themselves didn’t find them valuable. Auguste Fretelliere, a French colonist, remarked in 1843:

. . . sweetbreads, calves' flesh and head not being appreciated by the Mexicans, they gave them to us for nothing.

Beef or calf heads, were actually once considered a mainstream and highly prized cut of beef and dish in the United States. Calf head recipes appear in many early mainstream American cookbooks, from American Cookery by Amelia Simmons to The Virginia House-Wife by Mary Randolph, to What Mrs. Fisher Knows About Old Southern Cooking by Abby Fisher.

The Tejano invention narrative also ignores the fact that such dishes have existed for a long time, not only throughout Mexico but also in South America. Menudo, for example, also exist in South America where it goes by Mondongo and Guatitas, since it was a dish brought from Spain where it’s known as Callos.

== See also ==
- Barbacoa
- Cabeza guateada
- Huatia
- Pachamanca
- Curanto
- Brain as food
- Eggs and brains
- Brain sandwich
- Maghaz
- Phospho-Energon
