= Barbacoa =

Style of cooked meat preparation originating in Latin America

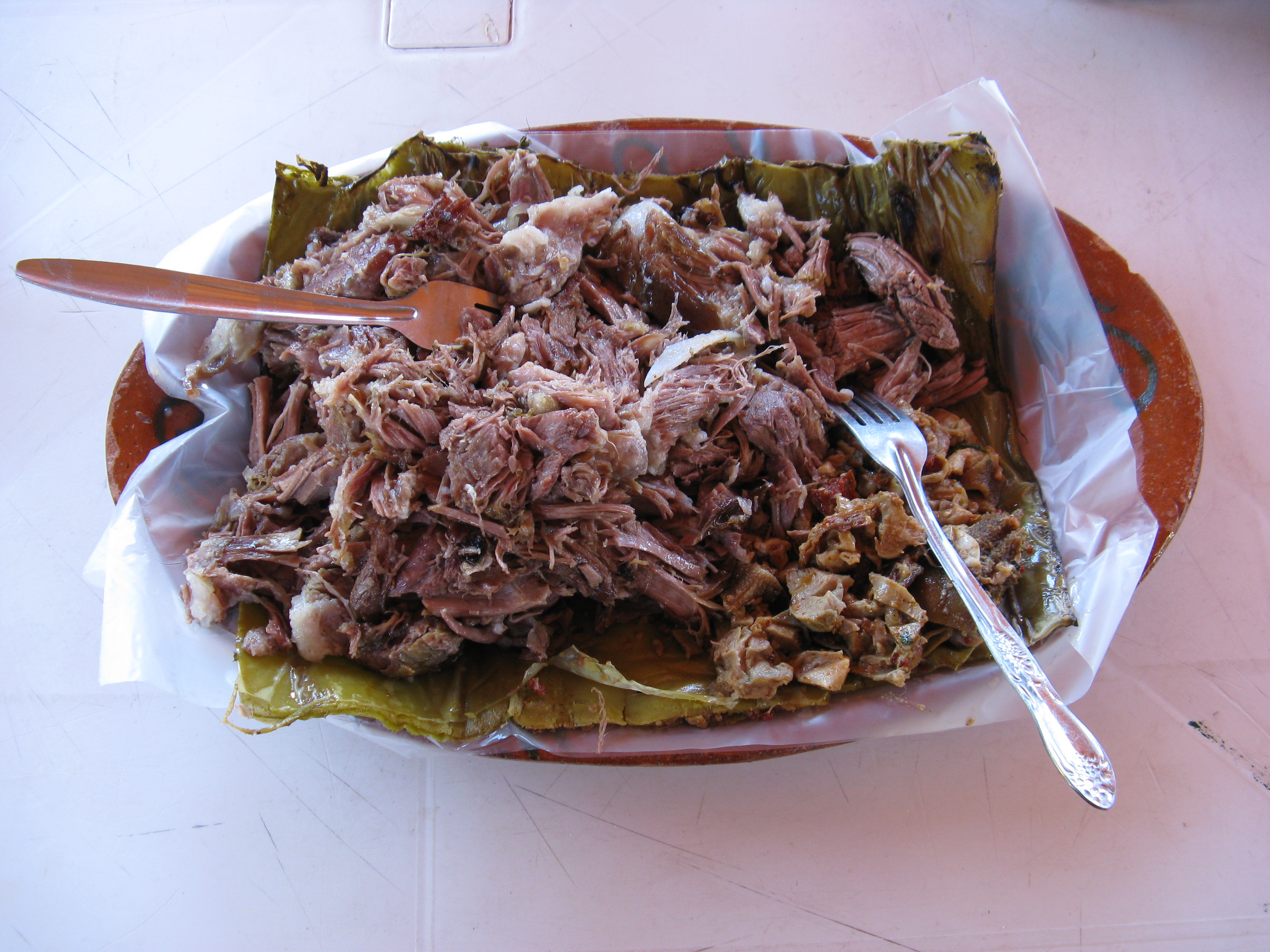
Barbacoa

Barbacoa, or asado en barbacoa (Spanish: [baɾβaˈkoa]) in Mexico, is the indigenous variation of the method of cooking in a pit or earth oven. It generally involves slow-cooking meats or whole sheep, whole cows, whole beef heads, or whole goats in a hole dug in the ground, and covered with agave (maguey) leaves, although the interpretation is loose, and in the present day (and in some cases) may refer to meat steamed until tender. This meat is known for its high fat content and strong flavor, often accompanied with onions and cilantro (coriander leaf). Because this method of cooking was used throughout different regions by different ethnic groups or tribes in Mexico, each had their own name for it; for the Nahuatl it was called nakakoyonki; for the Mayan it was called píib; for the Otomi it was called thumngö.

Similar methods exist throughout Latin America and the rest of the world, under distinct names, including pachamanca and huatia in the Andean region; curanto in Chile and southern Argentina; berarubu in Brazil; cocido enterrado in Colombia; or hāngī in New Zealand.

Although it is speculated that the word "barbacoa" may have originated from the Taíno language, this method of cooking in an earth oven has nothing to do with the original Taíno definition of the word.

== Etymology ==
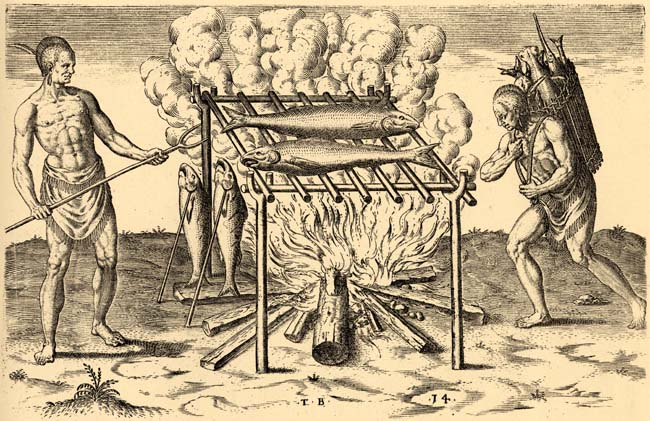
The Taíno term barbacoa means "framework of sticks" and it was applied to a wide range of wooden structures, including a raised wooden grill for roasting and smoking foods.

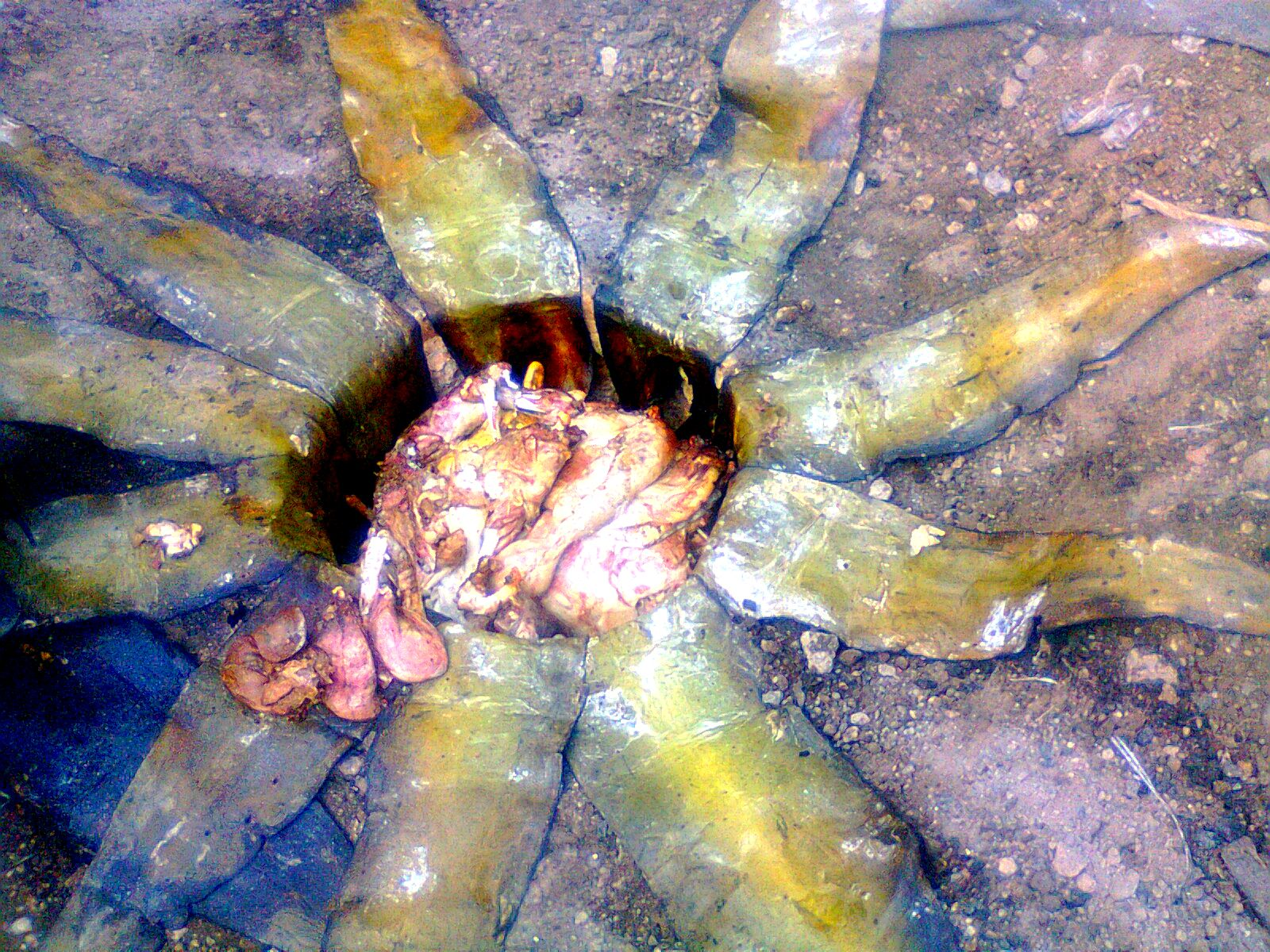
In Mexico, the term barbacoa was applied to the pit or earth oven used by the local indigenous people for cooking food.

There has been debate about the origin of the word barbacoa, with most scholars agreeing that it originates from the Taíno language. The Taíno term barabicu or barbacoa means "framework of sticks" or "reeds". It was applied, and continues to be applied throughout Latin America, to a wide range of objects or structures, like a raised wooden structure that the natives slept on; a raised wooden structure where they kept food away from the animals; a hanging hut; the attic of a hut; a scaffold; a wattle; a pergola for climbing plants; a wooden bridge, a shelter, a loft inside a house, a treehouse and a raised, small box filled with soil for cultivating vegetables; and a wooden grill where the natives would cure their meats over fire and smoke.

But in Mexico, for some unknown reason, the term barbacoa was applied by the Spaniards to the pit or earth oven used by the local indigenous people for cooking or roasting all kinds of foods. As a result from this discrepancy, a new hypothesis has been proposed that argues that the term barbacoa, as used in Mexico, originates not from the Taíno term but from the Mayan term Baalbak'Kaab, which supposedly means "meat covered with soil", although there is no evidence to support this.

== History ==
Earth ovens or barbacoa, as it’s known in Mexico, are an ancient, primitive method for cooking, steaming or roasting foods in holes or pits. Traditionally, in Mexico, a hole was dug in the ground proportionate to the size of the piece of meat or food being prepared; a fire was lit inside to heat it; In it, banana, maguey, or corn leaves are placed and with these the food that is to be roasted, whether meat or fish, is wrapped; then the hole is covered with soil, pressing it lightly and a large fire is lit on the surface layer; the food will remain roasting in this natural oven until cooked. In Pre-Columbian Mexico, turkey, deer, dog, fish, seafood, rabbit or turtles, and pencas de maguey (maguey stalks and hearts), were the most common meats and foods used. With the arrival of the Spanish, mutton, beef, pork, and goat became the meats of choice.

The asado en barbacoa (roasting in barbacoa) was widely prepared in Mexico at countryside festivities, such as rodeos (cattle roundups), herraderos (cattle branding celebrations), jaripeos and bull-fights, patron saint festivities of the hacienda, or family picnics. According to two articles published by Mexican writer Domingo Revilla in 1844 and 1845, respectively, the "banquet" at the herraderos was reduced to barbacoas and asados al pastor (spit roasting barbecues) of whole calves (veal), bull or sheep, and wrote that while barbacoa was more common in the Mezquital valley -particularly from Actopan-, and Apan valleys and surrounding areas, asados al pastor were more common in Tierra Adentro or the Bajío region and beyond.

In her book Life in Mexico (1843), Scottish noblewoman Frances Erskine Inglis, wrote about her experiences attending the rodeos and herraderos in central Mexico, near the town of Santiago in Hidalgo, in 1840, and describes how at the end of an herradero a whole bull was cooked in barbacoa:

The last day of the herraderos, by way of winding up, a bull was killed in honour of Calderón, and a great flag was sent streaming from a tree, on which flag was inscribed in large letters, "Gloria al Señor Ministro de la Augusta Cristina!" a piece of gallantry which I rewarded with a piece of gold. The animal, when dead, was given as a present to the toreadores; and this bull, cut in pieces, they bury with his skin on, in a hole in the ground previously prepared with fire in it, which is then covered over with earth and branches. During a certain time, it remains baking in this natural oven, and the common people consider it a great delicacy, (in which I differ from them).

In the cities, though, barbacoa was very rarely prepared in homes, rather, it was sold and bought in the public markets, as it was a tedious and difficult process. In her book —Face to Face with the Mexicans (1889)— Fanny Chambers Gooch Iglehart, wrote:

Barbacoa is one of the principal articles of food known to the Mexican market—and is good enough for the table of a king. The dexterous native takes a well-dressed mutton, properly quartered, using also head and bones. A hole is made in the ground, and a fire built in it. Stone slabs are thrown in, and the hole is covered. When thoroughly hot, a lining is made of maguey leaves, the meat put in, and covered with maguey, the top of the hole is also covered, and the process of cooking goes on all night. The next morning it is put in a hot vessel, ready to eat-a delicious, brown, crisp, barbecued mutton. As the process is difficult and tedious, it is not generally prepared in the families, and even the wealthiest patronize the market for this delicacy, ready cooked.

== Styles ==
By the 20th century, as a result of urbanization, the Mexican Revolution, the cost of living, and other social and economic changes, different styles of barbacoa began to emerge depending on the region. According to Mexican chef and professor, Josefina Velázquez de León’s book Platillos Regionales de la República Mexicana (1946) barbacoa is prepared in different ways, thus, each region of Mexico has its own style taking advantage of its own local various productions and customs.

=== Barbacoa de cabeza ===
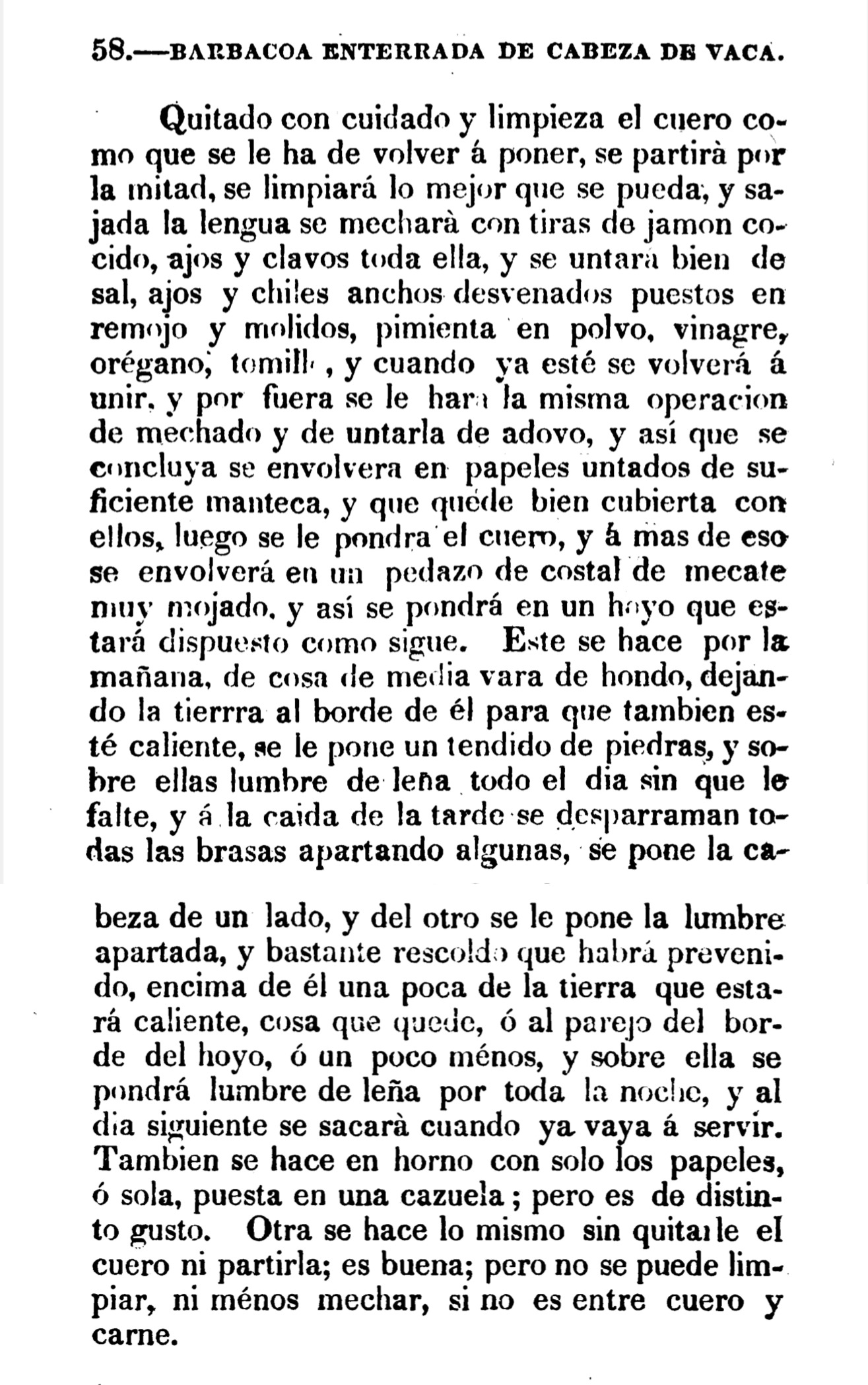
A Barbacoa de Cabeza recipe from 1836, from the Mexican cookbook Nuevo y Sencillo Arte de Cocina, Repostería y Refrescos by Antonia Carrillo

The most common barbacoa prepared and consumed all across Mexico is barbacoa de res (beef barbacoa). In many regions, especially in southern Mexico and along the Gulf Coast, entire cow barbacoa is prepared. But the most common, and one of the oldest, is barbacoa de cabeza, or beef-head barbacoa.

Barbacoa de cabeza, also known as Cabeza guateada in Argentina and Paraguay, consists in roasting an entire cow head, including tongue and brains, in an earth oven. After being cleaned and seasoned, the beef-head is wrapped either in maguey or banana leaves, or in a burlap sack. Then it is traditionally buried in a hole in the ground that had been previously prepared and heated with fire. The head will remain cooking in this natural oven for up to 15 hours.

Barbacoa de cabeza was prepared in Mexico and South America out of the need to use every part of the cow after slaughtering it for tasajo. In 18th and 19th century Mexico, and Latin America, most of the beef consumed was dried salted beef known as "tasajo". After slaughtering a cow, most of the flesh was salted and dried, with the exception of the lomo (loin, ribs), organs, and head. Typically, the lomo, ribs, and the organs, like the tripas, were roasted al pastor style (spit roasted), while the head was cooked in barbacoa.

=== Birria ===
Birria (Spanish: [ˈbirja]) is a regional variation of barbacoa from western Mexico, mainly made with goat or beef. The meat is marinated in an adobo made of vinegar, dried chiles, garlic, and herbs and spices (including cumin, bay leaves, and thyme) before being cooked in a broth (Spanish: consomé). Historically, birria was the regional name given in the state of Jalisco and surrounding areas to what is known as barbacoa, meats cooked or roasted in a pit or earth oven, in other regions of Mexico. For many people today, mainly in the United States, birria is now a distinct dish.

Restaurants or street carts that serve birria are known as birrierias and exist throughout Mexico, especially in Michoacán and Jalisco. However, neighboring Mexican states have their own variations of the dish, including Aguascalientes, Zacatecas, and Colima.

=== Cochinita pibil ===
Cochinita pibil (also puerco pibil or cochinita con achiote) is a traditional Yucatec Mayan slow-roasted pork dish from the Yucatán Peninsula. Preparation of traditional cochinita involves marinating the meat in strongly acidic citrus juice, adding annatto seed, which imparts a vivid burnt orange color, and roasting the meat in a píib (earth oven) while it is wrapped in banana leaf. According to recipes from the early 1900s, the whole pig (eviscerated and with the hair burned) was cooked in the earthen oven. Cochinita pibil is accompanied with red onion in sour orange and habanero chili, very common in the region.

=== Ximbo ===
Ximbo (from nximbo meaning "the heart of the maguey") is a traditional pit-barbecued pork dish from the Mexican states of Hidalgo and México. It originated in the Mezquital Valley, mainly in San Salvador and Actopan municipalities. Ximbo is an Otomi word. It is generally made from pork, beef, pork cueritos, fish, and chicken fried in chili sauce with nopalitos, cumin, oregano, and onions. It is then wrapped in small packages made of century plant leaf.

== Adaptations ==
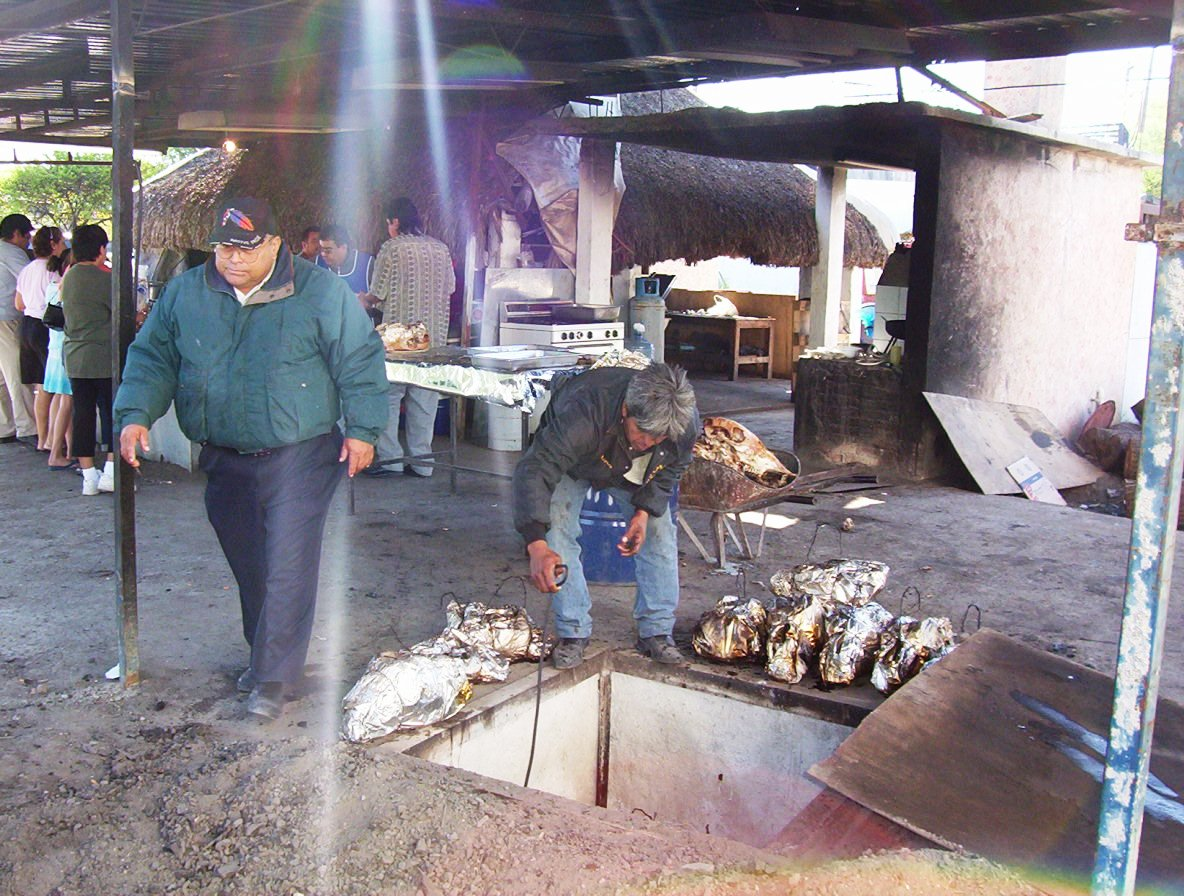
The original (or traditional) type of barbacoa oven

In the U.S., barbacoa is often prepared with parts from the heads of cattle, such as the cheeks, as in Mexico. In central Mexico, the meat of choice is lamb, and in the Yucatan, their traditional version, cochinita pibil (pit-style pork), is prepared with pork.

Barbacoa was later adopted into the cuisine of the southwestern United States by way of Texas. The word transformed in time to "barbecue".

In the Philippines, the Visayan dish balbacua (also spelled balbakwa) is named after barbacoa, probably for the similar length of cooking time and tenderness of the meat. It is a completely different dish. Unlike Latin American versions, it is a stew made from beef, oxtail, cow feet and skin boiled for several hours until gelatinous and extremely tender.

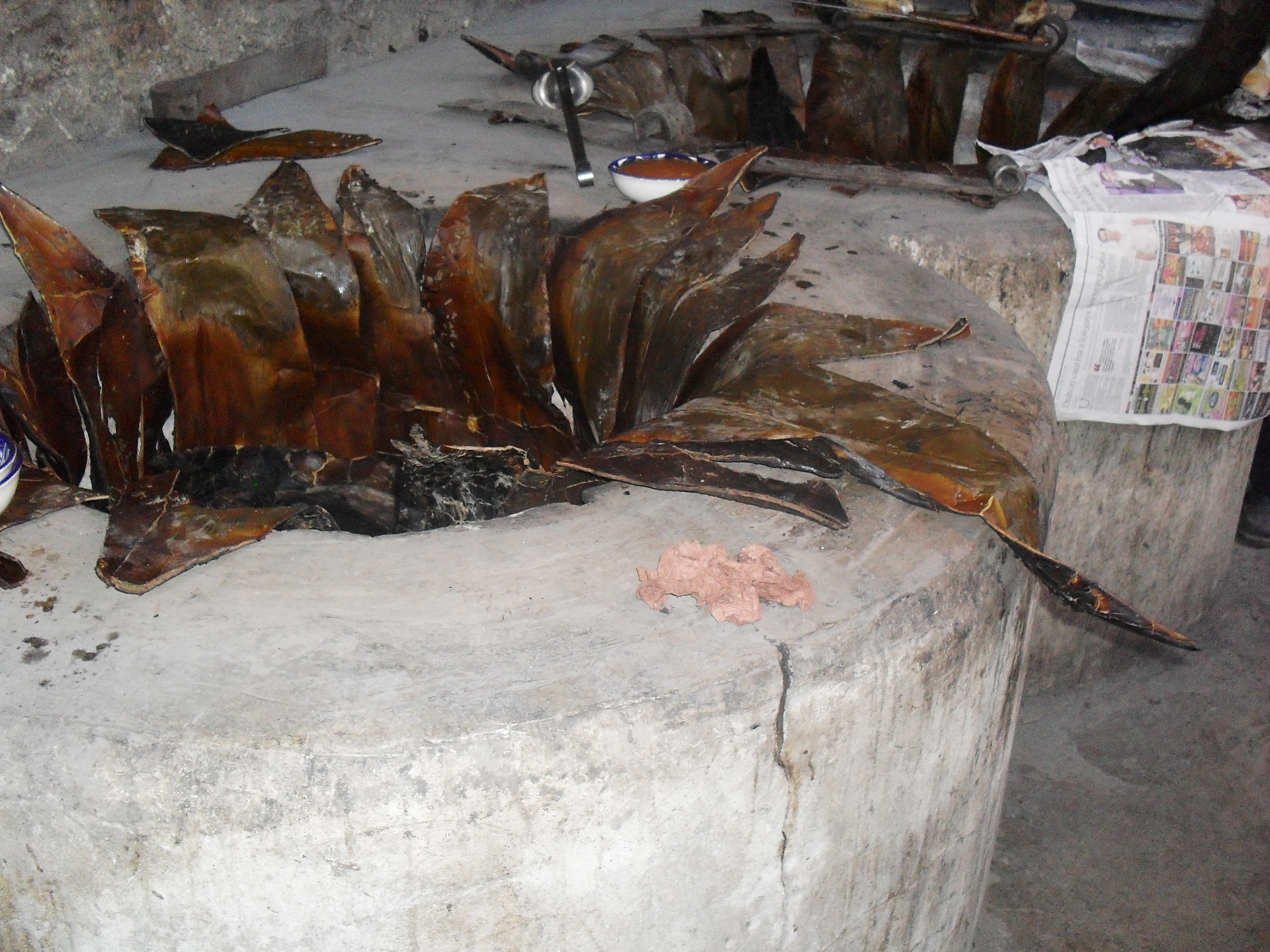
Maguey leaves

== Notable restaurants ==
Brownsville Texas's Vera's Backyard Bar-B-Que as of 2022 is the only restaurant in Texas still serving barbacoa made using the traditional method commercially because they are grandfathered in; all other legal commercial providers steam the meat rather than pit-smoking it.

== See also ==
- Cabeza guateada
- Carne asada
- Curanto
- Huatia
- Jerk
- List of Mexican dishes
- List of meat dishes
- Mandi (food)
- Pachamanca
