= Cabeza guateada =

Cabeza Guateada, Guatiada or Hueateada, also known as Vaka akangué yvyguy in Guarani, is a traditional gastronomic preparation of Northeastern Argentina and Paraguay consisting of a whole beef head traditionally roasted in an earth oven. It is a typical countryside dish prepared on special occasions in Argentina, specifically in the Catamarca, Salta, Tucumán and Jujuy provinces among the Gauchos. Similar dishes exist in, both, Mexico and Brazil, called barbacoa de cabeza and berarubu (or "cabeça de boi assada no chão"), respectively.

== Etymology ==
The term "guatiar", "guatear" or "huatear" comes from huatia, itself from the Quechua wathiya or huatiya, referring to an earth oven of Pre-Columbian origin used in the Andean region. "Vaka akangué yvyguy" from the Guarani means "cow head cooked underground".

== History ==
The origins of the wathiya or earth-oven, date back to pre-Columbian South America; the first Western chronicler to speak of the huatia was the priest Francisco de Ávila who around the year 1600, when compiling the myths existing among the people of Huarochirí, in the mountains of Lima, in the manuscript Huarochirí Manuscript, pointed out the figure of the god Huatiacuri, more strictly watya quriq (watya collector), son of the powerful Pariaqaqa, who was said to hide his divinity in a miserable appearance and only fed on potatoes roasted in heated earth ovens called huatias or huatiyas, which is why it received that name. For this reason it has been considered the personification of the potato.

The use of earth ovens or huatias, was common throughout the Andean region, including Northeastern Argentina. One of the most common dishes prepared in this region was beef, either a whole veal or just the head. A whole beef head, with eyes, tongue and skin, was roasted in an earth oven for many hours until cooked. It was prepared during special occasions in countryside festivities, specially in weddings, hence its nickname "manjar de bodas" (wedding delicacy).

=== Preparation ===
Traditionally, a hole is dug in the ground proportionate to the size of the piece of meat or food being prepared and a fire is lit inside to prepare and heat it. The beef-head, after being cleaned and drained, is marinated or seasoned with chopped garlic, oregano, salt (to taste), and ground chili. Then it is wrapped in a damp cloth (preferably burlap canvas soaked in water) and then it is placed into the pit and covered with embers. The hole is then covered with soil and ashes, allowing the head to cook for about twelve to 24 hours.

A more modern version replaces the earth oven with a clay oven (the typical Argentine country oven, made of adobe in the shape of a dome). When this oven is used, the embers are spread inside, then the beef head that is to be roasted is placed inside, and immediately after this the oven is completely sealed, allowing the head(s) to cook for twelve to fourteen hours.

== See also ==
- Huatia
- Curanto
- Pachamanca
- Barbacoa
- Barbacoa de Cabeza
