= Vera's Backyard Bar-B-Que =

Restaurant in Brownsville, Texas, United States

Coordinates: 25°54′30″N 97°28′08″W

- Interactive map of Vera's Backyard Bar-B-Que

Restaurant information
- Established: 1955
- Owner: Armando Vera
- Previous owners: Alberto and Carmen Vera
- Food type: Barbacoa
- Location: 2404 Southmost Rd, Brownsville, Texas, 78521, USA

Vera's Backyard Bar-B-Que is a restaurant in Brownsville, Texas, United States. In 2020 it was named an America's Classic by the James Beard Foundation. According to Texas Monthly the restaurant was, as of 2022, the only commercial entity in Texas serving barbacoa made with the traditional pit-smoking method.

== History ==
Alberto and Carmen Vera sold barbacoa from their home and opened the restaurant in 1955. Their son Armando Vera was born in 1960 and eventually took over. According to the James Beard Foundation, the methods they use date to the vaquero-cowboy culture of the area.

Production is a once-a-week process that culminates on weekends. Vera gathers ingredients on Wednesdays, does prep work Thursdays, starts cooking Fridays, and serves Saturdays and Sundays. The restaurant uses whole cow heads (minus the brain since 2005 because of concerns over mad cow) which are washed and wrapped in foil unseasoned. A brick-lined pit is heated with mesquite coals, and the foil packets are stacked in it, 40 to 90 at a time, then buried while they roast for eight hours. Because of health codes, Vera's as of 2022 is unique in serving barbacoa made using this traditional method commercially because they are grandfathered in; all other legal commercial providers steam the meat rather than pit-smoking it.

== Menu ==
The restaurant uses traditional methods to smoke barbacoa de cabeza, also called barbacoa de cabeza de res en pozo. The dish consists of a cow's head, which is pit-smoked. Various parts such as the cheek, tongue, and eyes are sold separately as well as a pulled mixture of the remaining meats. The restaurant also offers other traditional offal dishes and brisket. Accompaniments consist of tortillas to make tacos and garnishes, and there are no side dishes. Local business is carried out; according to Cowboys and Indians, only those from outside the area eat at the restaurant.

== Recognition ==
In 2020 the restaurant was named America's Classic by the James Beard Foundation. When the Beard Foundation called to inform Vera of the award, he hung up on them twice, thinking they were trying to scam him; he stopped answering the phone, and the foundation had to call Brownsville mayor Trey Mendez to contact Vera and convince him the award was legitimate and very prestigious.
