= Inca cuisine =

Cuisine of the Inca civilization

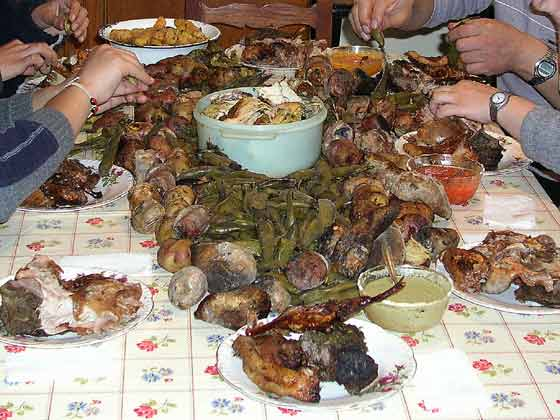
Pachamanca, a traditional dish consisting of food prepared in a huatia.

Inca cuisine originated in pre-Columbian times within the Inca civilization from the 13th to the 16th century. The Inca civilization stretched across many regions on the western coast of South America (specifically Peru), and so there was a great diversity of unique plants and animals used for food. The most important plant staples involved various tubers, roots, and grains; and the most common sources of meat were guinea pigs, llamas, fish, and other aquatic and terrestrial organisms (305-307). Cuisine was heavily influenced by the Inca's food storage system, social gatherings and celebrations, and social status (308-315).

== Foods ==
There were also several types of edible clay, like pasa, which was used as sauce for potatoes and other tubers, and chaco, something used by the poor or religiously devout. As in the rest of Central and South America, chili peppers were an important and highly praised part of their diet.

=== Vegetables and fruits ===
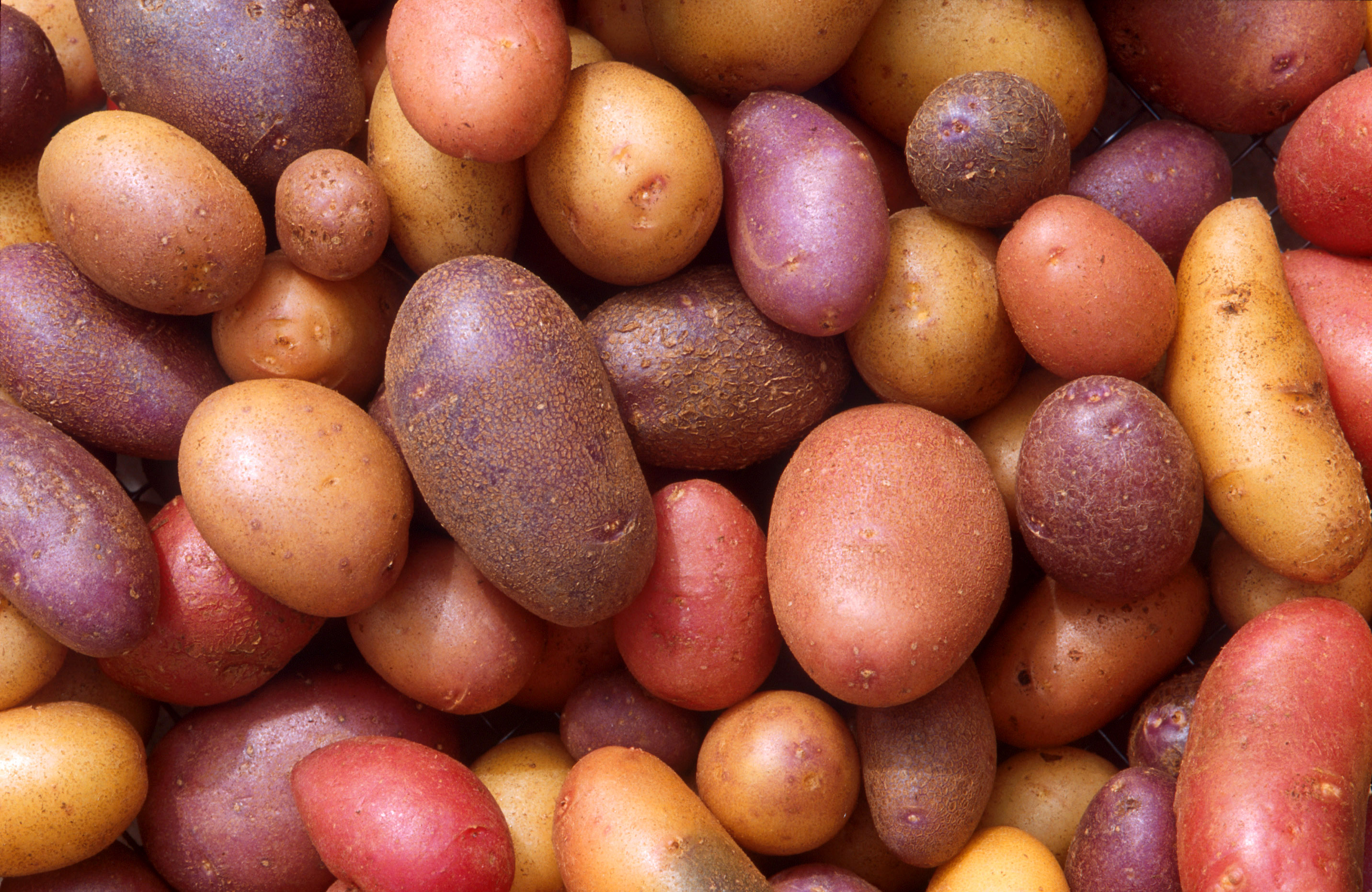
The people of the Andes developed hundreds of varieties of potatoes, most still unknown in the rest of the world

The Inca realm stretched north–south, encompassing a great variety of climate zones. In particular, the mountain ranges in Peru provide highly varied types of growing zones at different altitudes, explaining why there were many terraces built for agriculture. The different altitudes that the terraces were built in helped create a way for the Incas to be able to cultivate a wide number of staples. For example:

- Potatoes were highly valued for their wide diversity and adaptability to different environments and climates. They were commonly used in stews (308).
- There was also oca (oca), which came in two varieties, sweet and bitter. The sweet variety could be eaten raw or preserved and was used as a sweetener before the arrival of sugar made from sugar cane.
- Similar to oca in purpose, paiko (Dysphania ambrosioides), was a part of the Inca diet for flavoring and edible leaves. Species of the Chenopodium family in the Inca cuisine were Chenopodium pallidicaule, also known as cañihua, and Chenopodium quinoa, or quinoa, due to their ability to survive in the high altitudes of the Andes. Quinoa has grown popular in the modern world beyond the Andes due to its adaptability, nutritional value, and many uses.
- Another high-altitude plant in Inca cuisine is Lupinus mutabilis, also known as tarwi or chocho. High in protein, this plant was often eaten with chilis and onions after being carefully treated, since improper treatment can leave the crop poisonous. Like chocho in protein count, Ahipa (Pachyrhizus ahipa) was another crop in Inca cuisine. It grows rapidly and has a high yield rate of the tubers that were cherished for their sweet taste like water chestnuts.
- Another tuber consumed in the Andes was Tropaeolum tuberosum, also known as mashua and añu in Quechua, due to its resistance to droughts and frost. It was specially prepared and cooked to bring out the flavor that was desired as it was very bitter before doing so. So much so that it was considered an aphrodisiac and given to the Inca soldiers during campaigns to make them forget about their spouses.
- Other roots that could be found in the Inca cuisine were the maka (Lepidium meyenii) and the yacón (Polymnia sonchifolia). Maka was capable of surviving in the coldest and highest areas of the Andes, thus giving it high value. Yacón was documented to be similar to a turnip in texture but was very sweet and kept well, making them popular on sea voyages.
- The insipid, starchy root ullucu, and arracacha, something like a cross between carrot and celery, were, like potatoes, used in stews and soup. Achira, a species of Canna, was a sweet, starchy root that was baked in earth ovens. Since it had to be transported up to the power center of Cuzco, it is considered to have been food eaten as part of a tradition. Although the roots and tubers provided the staples of the Inca, they were still considered lower in rank than maize (Zea mays).
- It has been found that the Inca-conquered lands were often transitioned from potato fields to maize fields, more than likely due to maize being the main ingredient of chicha.
- Several species of seaweed, such as Porphyra, Durvillaea antarctica, and Ulva lactuca were part of the Inca diet and could be eaten fresh or dried. Some freshwater algae and blue algae of the genus Nostoc were eaten raw or processed for storage. In post-colonial times it has been used to make a dessert by boiling it in sugar. Pepino, a refreshing and thirst-quenching fruit, was eaten by common folk, but scorned by "pampered folk" and was considered difficult to digest.
- Another fruit that was available to the Incas was the passion fruit (Passiflora spp.) which was actually named so by the Spanish conquistadors and explorers due to the claim that the flowers of the plant contained the symbols of the passion of Christ. The fruit itself is like a pomegranate as they both have a mass of seeds covered by juicy flesh.
- A fruit that was described as an interesting snack available in the Andes during the time of the Inca Empire was the paqay (Inga feuilleei), or the guaba, which was known for its sweet, spongey substance that covers its seeds. A lesser valued fruit within Inca cuisine was the lúcuma (Lucuma bifera) which was difficult to consume and had little flavor. Opposite to the lucuma in popularity, due to their tender texture and the sweet juice they produce, were the almonds within Caryocar amygdaliferum of the Chachapoyas. They were luxury goods for many generations as many have been found within early tombs of the region.

=== Meats ===
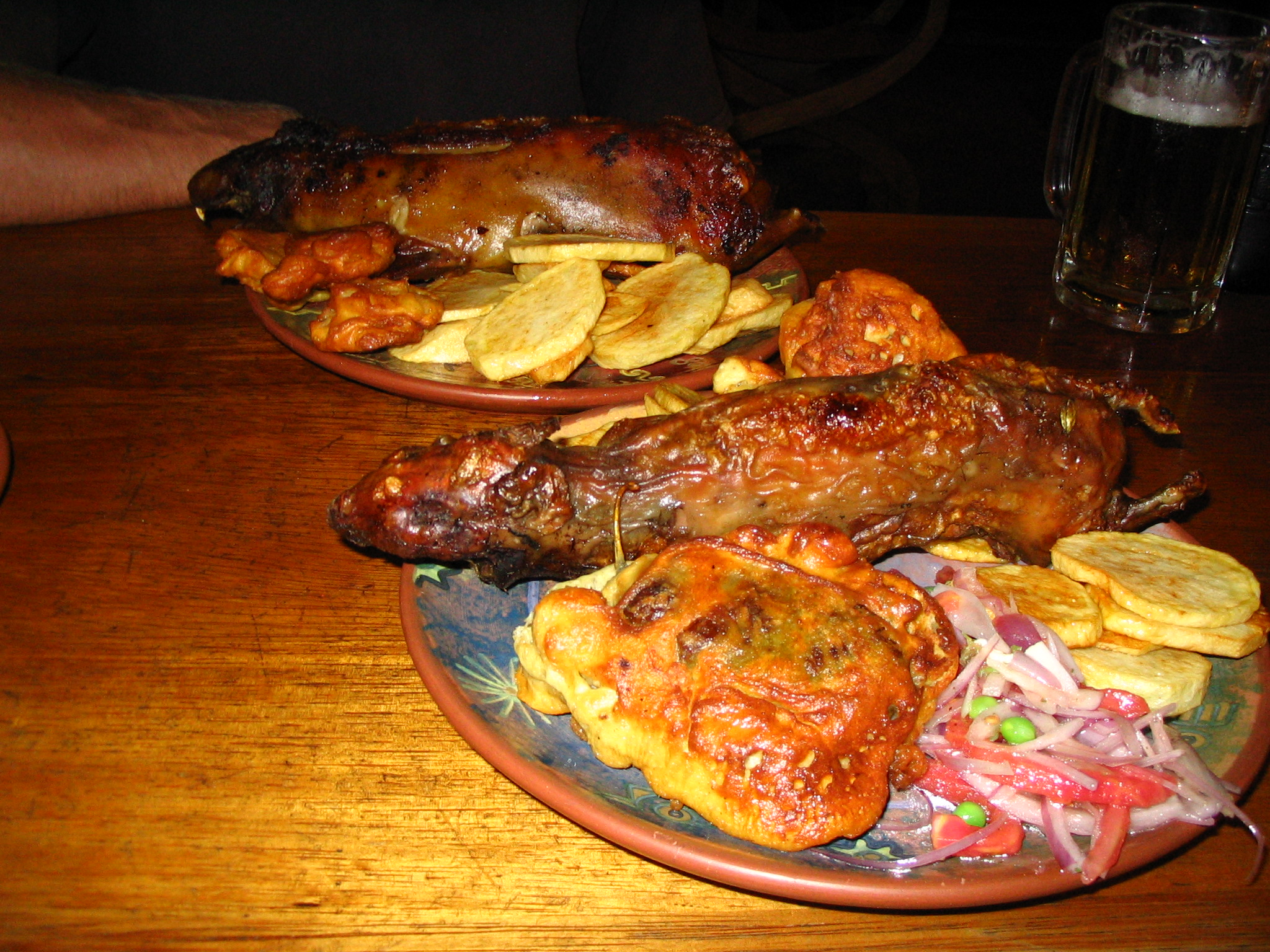
Two modern Peruvian dishes of cuy meat

Peoples of the Altiplano had two large domesticated animals: llamas and alpacas.

Among the food products made from the Peruvian camelids was sharqui, strips of freeze-dried meat, the origin of modern-day jerky. Another meat for royalty was that of the lizards known as Dicrodon holmbergi. It would be trapped as it attempted to consume the pods of Prosopis juliflora. After being trapped, it would be paralyzed and cooked until it was easily skinned. Afterwards, it was cooked for another ten minutes in heated sand and ashes then gutted, thus making it to be consumed immediately or preserved for up to a year.

The meat of the common folk was the cuy, guinea pig. They were domesticated by 2000 BC and were easy to keep and multiplied rapidly. Guinea pigs were often cooked by stuffing them with hot stones. The entrails would often be used as an ingredient in soups along with potatoes, or made into a sauce. They could also be used for divination, which later brought them into disfavor by the Catholic Church.

The Incas hunted game including the wild camelids vicuña and guanaco, whitetail deer, huemul deer and viscacha, a kind of chinchilla which was hunted with lassos. Hunting rights were controlled by the state and any meat would go into the state warehouses for storage. In massive royal hunts, hunting teams would force huge herds into enclosures, and there are reports of several thousand animals being caught in a single great hunt, including puma, bear, fox and deer.

One mainstay of the Inca army and the general population was dried fish. Skates, rays, small sharks of the genus Mustelus, mullets and bonito were among the fish caught off the Peruvian coast. Other sea creatures like seabirds, penguins, sea lions and dolphins were eaten, as were various crustaceans and chitons, limpets, mussels, chanque (an abalone-like animal).

Like other American peoples, the Inca ate animals that were often considered vermin by many Europeans, such as frogs, caterpillars, beetles, and ants. Mayfly larvae were eaten raw or toasted and ground to make loaves that could then be stored.

The Inca's intricate food preservation methods and storage system allowed for there to be enough food in times of need (when crops failed, during times of war) or in times of success (when celebrating and rewarding everyone's hard work).

== Food preparation ==
Archaeological excavation of ceramic assemblages, pertaining to the Inca, reveal the variety of vessels used in their cuisine. In many excavations, of the ceramic assemblages found, about one tenth tend to be vessels.

Ollas were used for cooking, boiling, and stewing, and were essential to Inca cuisine preparation. Ollas were used frequently, since boiling was one of the most repeated food preparation techniques. The vessel is characterized by its wide mouth, with a variety of bases, including the conical-based, round-bottomed, and pedestal-based forms. The Moche, a civilization inhabiting the region before the Inca, elevated olla production by implementing the paddle-and-anvil technique. This technique involved a stone being held on the inside of the vessel, while a wooden paddle was used to form the outside's shape. The practice of the paddle-and-anvil technique added an artistic aspect to the creation of ollas, as the technique provided plenty of flexibility and variation for designing unique vessels. This practice continued into the Inca time period.

Other ceramic vessels could be associated with chicha production, which involves its own intricate system of preparation. El Shincal, located in the Argentinian province of Catamarcas, is a chicha production site observed in archaeological studies. Archaeologists have interpreted the purpose of the site as a location that solely caters to feasts and ceremonial events, rather than as a place of permanent settlement.

This site includes an abundance of bedrock mortars, which were used for grinding and crushing of organic materials. Apart from maize, there is evidence of using the mortars for trees, beans, fruits, and animal bones. In regards to chicha, archaeologists believe the workforce at the mortars was predominantly female, considering chicha production is associated with feminine roles. The wide variety of materials used, and the large number of present mortars, demonstrates the location’s important role as a place of mass production. Chicha production sites, like El Shincal, demonstrate the complex production dedicated to preparing for successful and extravagant ceremonial celebrations that revolve around chicha consumption.

Additional preparation methods, such as mixing, soaking, or drying, vary plenty depending on the food, and often use a wide variety of vessels to cater to the specific method. Preparation methods will continue to evolve with time as new ways are discovered and adapted with changing availability to resources. Adaptation and flexibility are essential to prioritizing how culinary practices are carried out to best represent the cultural values held by a community.

== Serving and consumption ==
In order to properly honor the transition from preparation to consumption, the Inca used ceramic vessels as a way to add artistic and cultural value to the dishes being served.

Present at archaeological excavations of Machu Picchu are the ceramic vessels known as cazuelas, prominent among others found at the site. Archaeologists interpreted that the vessel was used for serving, rather than preparation, due to its morphology. With its openness, the vessel is easily accessible for consumption purposes, and lacks aspects that support pouring or closing. Cazuelas could have been used for consumption of soups, stews, porridges, or even chicha. Its characteristic polychrome designs further support idea of the vessel being used for serving and consumption purposes.

With the cultural significance held by chicha, it had an array of purposes when it came to consumption. Being used in ceremonial and ritual events, chicha was used to influence social relations and classes. Chicha was used as a way to mitigate relationships between authoritative figures and workers, especially in the workplace itself. Toasting of chichawas often associated with connection to honoring ancestors. Consumption could either be done at large-scale gatherings, or in private settings, which were more restricted to elite members of the community.

Specifically, through use of isotope analysis, archaeologists have discovered a relationship between maize consumption and status of combatants who lived in Majes Valley, a pre-hispanic region located in the Andes. In remains of combatants found in the region, archaeologists used tooth enamel to assess the presence of a high maize-consuming diet. Conclusively, archaeologists interpreted the levels of maize consumption in the combatants demonstrated a method of preparation for battle. Maize, or chicha, could have been used as a way to fortify the identities of the combatants, ensuring the elite status that came with the role they were carrying out. Maize consumption could be used in other contexts to shape social or political environments by promoting elite identities within.

== Storage and preservation ==
Storehouses, which were used primarily for military purposes, were used by the Inca to facilitate traveling over long distances. Being placed conveniently along major travel routes, the storehouses acted as a place of refuge when it came to the restocking of resources. Location was chosen strategically for the purpose of securing a cooler area characterized by higher ventilation to prevent rotting of perishable items. Perishable foods ranged, while some were prepared to a certain extent, some were completely untreated. Freeze-dried foods were common in the storehouses, such as ch'arki, which is a form of dried meat. Additionally, potato tubers were freeze-dried and stored as chuño. Storehouses quickly became a valued practice for the Inca, but were limited at times when communities prioritized local growth of foods, instead.

Archaeologists have excavated ceramic vessels that provide evidence for different types of storage and preservation methods. Aríbalos, vessels with high flaring necks and cone-shaped bases, are interpreted to have been used as a way of storing chicha. Additionally, ceramic vessels could have been used for storage of foods in water or for long-term preparation methods.

== See also ==
- Peruvian cuisine
- Bolivian cuisine
- Chilean cuisine
- Ecuadorian cuisine
- Muisca cuisine
