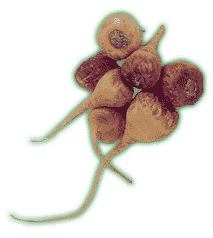
- Maca hypocotyl and root

Scientific classification
- Kingdom: Plantae
- Clade: Embryophytes
- Clade: Tracheophytes
- Clade: Spermatophytes
- Clade: Angiosperms
- Clade: Eudicots
- Clade: Rosids
- Order: Brassicales
- Family: Brassicaceae
- Genus: Lepidium
- Species: L. meyenii

Binomial name
- Lepidium meyenii Walp.

Synonyms
- Lepidium peruvianum

= Lepidium meyenii =

Plant species native to South America

Lepidium meyenii, known as maca or Peruvian ginseng, is an edible herbaceous biennial plant of the family Brassicaceae that is native to South America in the high Andes mountains of Peru and Bolivia. Its use increased after the late 1980s, when it was commercially discovered.

It is grown for its fleshy hypocotyl that is fused with a taproot, which is typically dried but may also be freshly cooked as a root vegetable. As a cash crop, it is primarily exported as a powder that may be raw or processed further as a gelatinized starch or as an extract. If dried, it may be processed into a flour for baking or as a dietary supplement.

== Description ==
Maca is the only member of the genus Lepidium with a fleshy hypocotyl, which is fused with the taproot to form a rough inverted pear-shaped body. Traditionally, native growers have acknowledged four varieties of maca based on their root color: cream-yellow, half-purple, purple, and black; varying levels of anthocyanin are primarily responsible for the color differences. Maca hypocotyls may be gold or cream, red, purple, blue, black, or green. Each is considered a genetically unique variety, as the seeds of the parent plants grow to have roots of the same color.

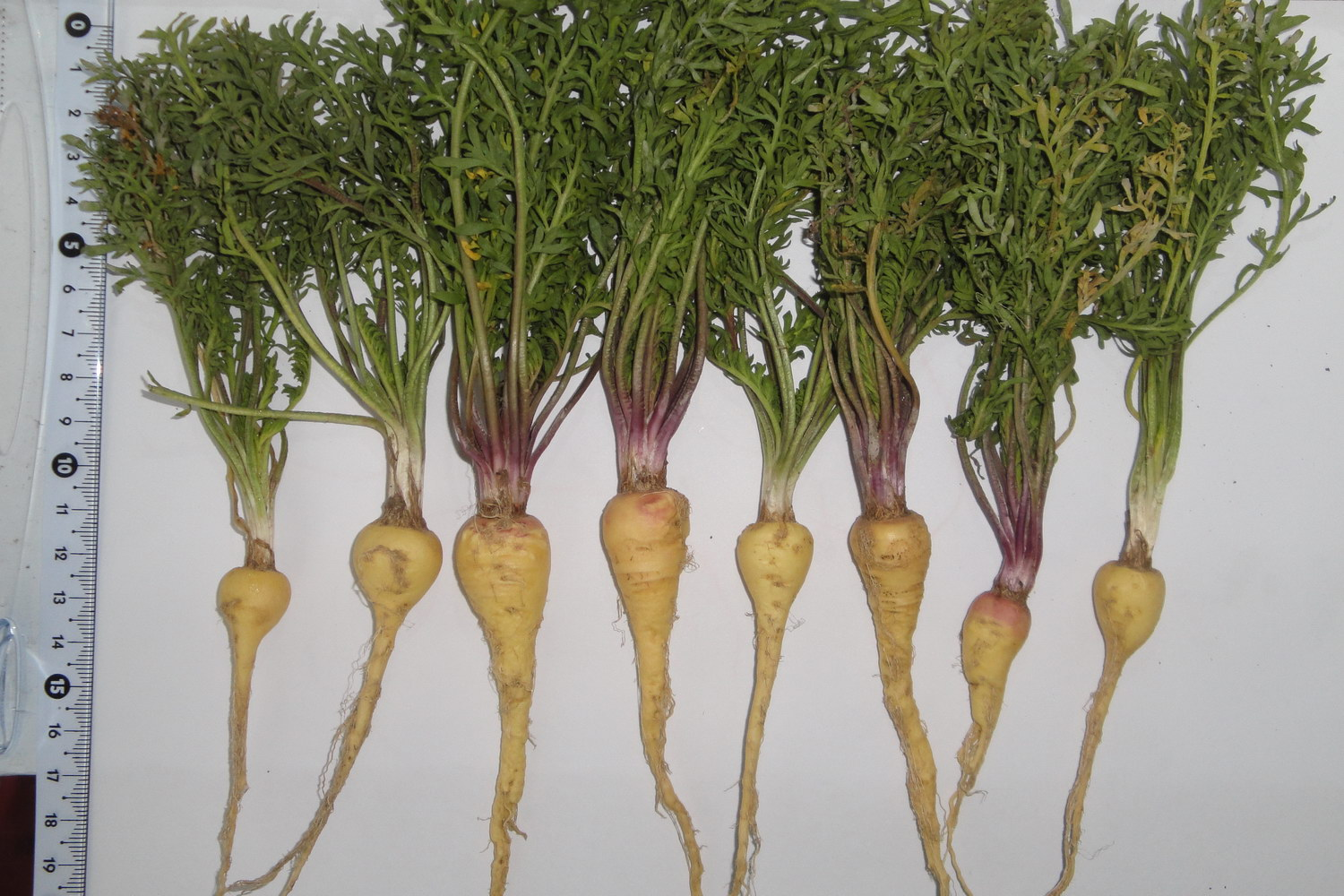
Maca plants

The growth habit, size, and proportions of maca are roughly similar to those of radishes and turnips, to which it is related, but it also resembles a parsnip. The green, fragrant tops are short and lie along the ground. The thin, frilly leaves sprout in a rosette at the soil surface, not growing more than 12–20 cm (4 1/2–8 in) in height. The leaves show a dimorphism according to the reproductive stage. They are more prominent in the vegetative phase and continuously renew from the center as the outer leaves die.

The off-white, self-fertile flowers are borne on a central raceme, and are followed by 4–5 mm (5/32–3/16 in) siliculate fruits, each containing two small 2–2.5 mm (1/16–1/8 in) reddish-gray ovoid seeds. Seeds are the maca's only means of reproduction. Maca reproduces mainly through self-pollination: it is an autogamous species. The genome consists of 64 chromosomes. Maca is a short-day plant from experiments with different day lengths. Some sources consider the maca an annual plant, as in favorable years, it can complete a lifecycle within a year.

Maca contains glucotropaeolin, m-methoxyglucotropaeolin, benzyl glucosinolates, polyphenols, (1R,3S)-1-methyl-1,2,3,4-tetrahydro-β-carboline-3-carboxylic acid (MTCA), and p-methoxybenzyl isothiocyanate. Alkamides are also present in maca. Maca contains several N-benzylamides referred to as macamides that are structurally related to anandamide.

== Taxonomy ==
Antonio Vázquez de Espinosa described the plant following his visit to Peru circa 1598, and Bernabé Cobo described this plant in the early 17th century. Gerhard Walpers named the species Lepidium meyenii in 1843. In the 1990s, Gloria Chacon further distinguished a different species. She considered the widely cultivated natural maca of today to be a newer domesticated species, L. peruvianum.

However, most botanists doubt this distinction and continue to call the cultivated maca L. meyenii. The Latin name recognized by the United States Department of Agriculture similarly continues to be Lepidium meyenii. It has been debated whether it is botanically correct to consider meyenii and peruvianum to be distinct from one another. A 2015 multi-center study found differences in taxonomy, visual appearance, phytochemical profiles and DNA sequences when comparing L. meyenii and L. peruvianum, suggesting that they are different and that their names should not be considered synonyms.

== Cultivation ==
Specific phenotypes (in maca, 'phenotype' pertains mainly to root color) have been propagated exclusively to increase commercial interest.

=== Growth conditions ===
The natural environment of the maca is at 11–12ºS latitude and at an elevation of 3,800–4,400 m (12,500–14,400 ft) above sea level. At this elevation, temperatures of the growing season vary from −2 to 13 °C (28 to 55 °F) in monthly mean minimum or maximum, respectively. Temperatures can decline, however, as low as −10 °C (14 °F) and frosts are common. Of the cultivated plants, maca is one of the most frost tolerant. Strong winds and sunlight are also characteristics of the native habitat of the maca. Maca today is still mainly cultivated in Peru, in the high Andes of Bolivia, and to a small extent also in Brazil. Maca can be cultivated beyond its natural elevation range, over 4,400 m (14,400 ft) above sea level.

=== Growth ===
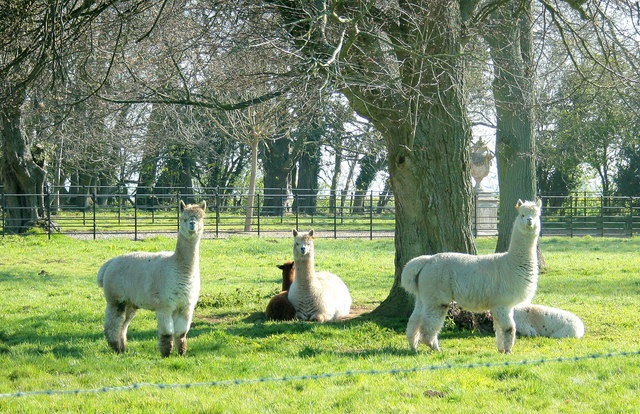
Alpaca manure is used to fertilize maca croplands.

The seedlings usually emerge about one month after sowing, with the onset of the rainy season in October. In the vegetative phase, from May to June, the lower part of the hypocotyl, as well as the upper part of the tap root, grows in size. After 260 to 280 days, it is formed into the harvestable hypocotyl. If the root is left in the soil, it is dormant for two to three months in the time of the cold, dry season until August. Then, it will form a generative shoot on which the seeds ripen five months later. One plant can form up to 1,000 tiny seeds, 1,600 of which weigh about one gram. Thus, only relatively few plants are needed for propagation. The cultivated plants are selected for preferred size and color, then placed 50–100 mm deep in pits with alternate layers of grass and soil to protect them from drying out. They are fertilized heavily, as maca is an exhaustive crop of soil. The cultivation cycle is strictly linked to seasonality.

Traditionally, land preparation was done by hand. Nowadays, tractor plowing is also used. As maca grows on sites where no other crops can be cultivated, it is often found after long fallows of sheep grazing pastures. Maca croplands, thus, traditionally are only fertilized with sheep and alpaca manure; however, fertilizer application could prevent soils from depleting in nutrients.

Weeding or pesticide application usually is not necessary. The climate is not suitable for most weeds or pests. Nearly all maca cultivation in Peru is carried out organically; maca is seldom attacked. Maca is sometimes interplanted with potatoes, as it is known to maca farmers that the plant naturally repels most root crop pests.

=== Harvest ===
The harvest is done manually, with the leaves left in the field as livestock feed or organic fertilizer.

The yield for a cultivated hectare may reach an estimated 15 tons in fresh hypocotyls, resulting in around 5 tons of dried material. According to the Ministry of Agriculture of Peru, however, average maca yields for 2005 were only 7 t/ha, with a great variation between different sites. Although maca has been cultivated outside the Andes, it is unclear whether it develops the same active constituents or potency outside of its natural habitat. Hypocotyls grown from Peruvian seeds form with difficulty at low elevations, in greenhouses, or warm climates.

== Phytochemicals ==
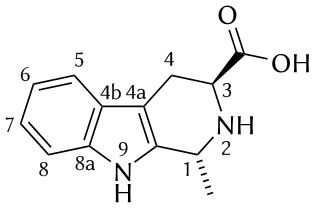
(1R,3S)-1-Methyltetrahydro-carboline-3-carboxylic acid found in maca

No pharmacokinetic data have been published for maca. The presence of (1R,3S)-1-methyl-1,2,3,4-tetrahydro-β-carboline-3-carboxylic acid (MTCA) in the extracts of maca indicate a potential safety issue as a monoamine oxidase inhibitor (re. which see β-carboline) and possibility as a mutagen. Due to these potential mutagenic properties of MTCA, the Agency for Sanitary Security in France warned consumers about the possible health risks of powdered maca root, a declaration disputed on the assumption that MTCA would be deactivated by boiling to process maca roots. MTCA-like compounds are associated with craving behaviour.

== Uses ==
The average composition, on a dry matter basis, is 60–75% carbohydrates (primarily as polysaccharides).

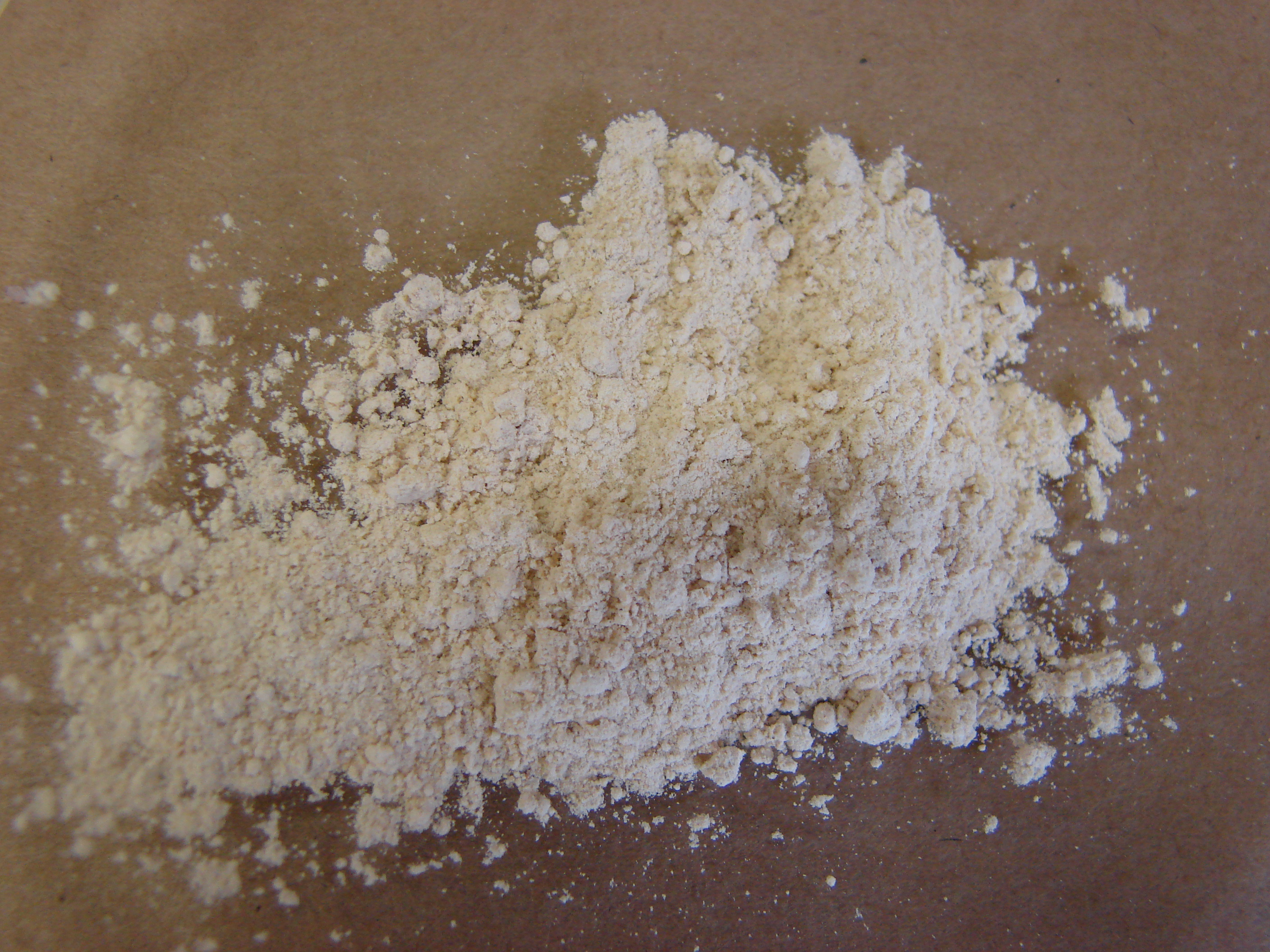
Maca root powder

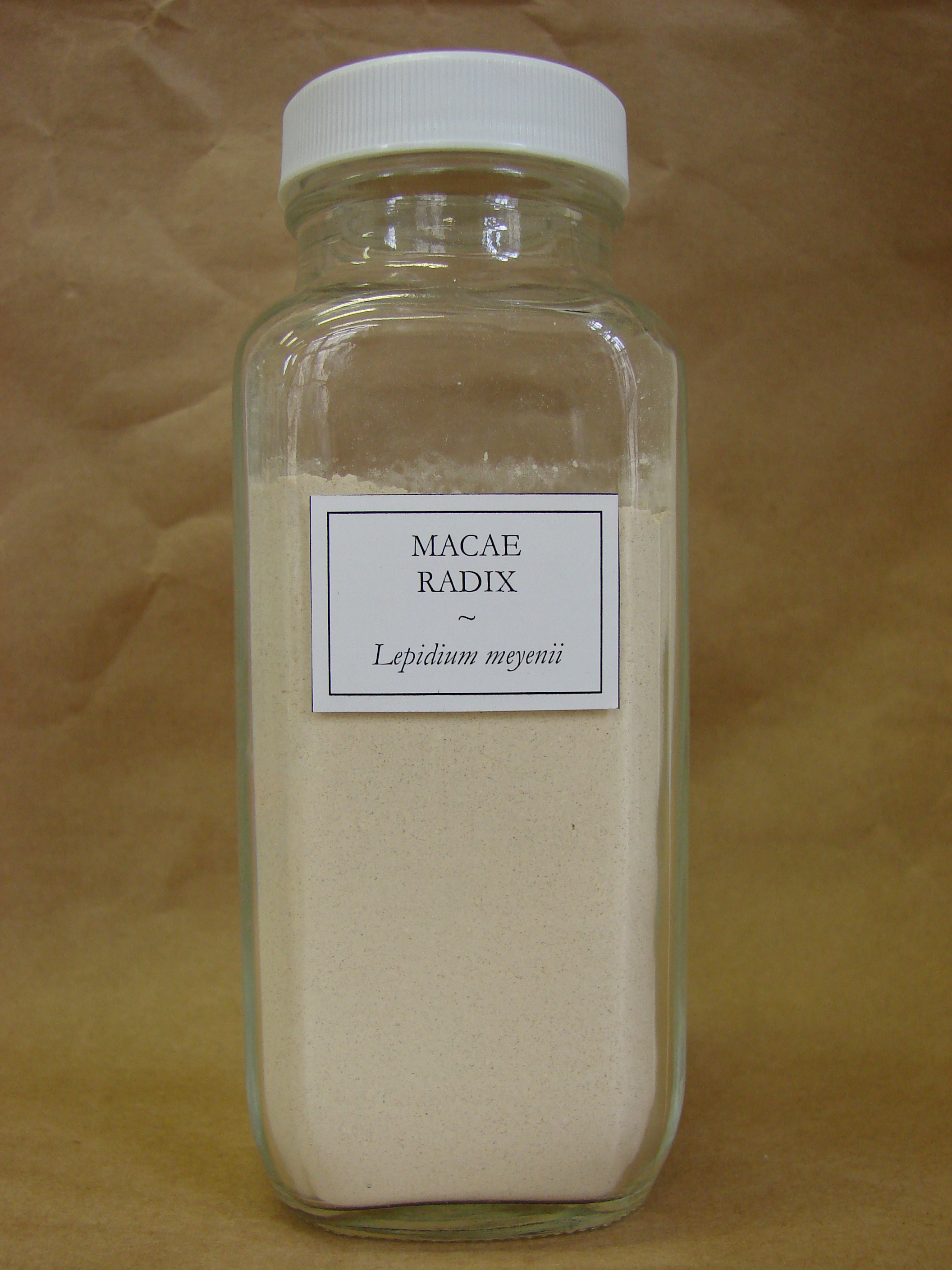
Bottled root powder

Maca is mainly grown for the consumption of its roots. The majority of harvested maca is dried. In this form, the hypocotyls can be stored for several years. In Peru, maca is prepared and consumed in various ways, although traditionally, it is always cooked. The freshly harvested hypocotyl may be roasted in a pit (called huatia) and is considered a delicacy. Fresh roots usually are available only in the vicinity of the growers. The root can also be mashed and boiled to produce a sweet, thick liquid, then dried and mixed with milk to form a porridge, mazamorra. The cooked roots are also used with other vegetables in empanadas, jams, or soups. The root may be ground to produce flour for bread, cakes, or pancakes. If fermented, a weak beer called chicha de maca may be produced. In 2010, a U.S.-based brewery called Andean Brewing Company became the first company to produce and commercialize beer made from maca under the brand KUKA Beer. From the black morphotype, a liquor is produced. Also, the leaves are edible or may serve as animal fodder. They can be prepared raw in salads or cooked much like L. sativum and L. campestre, which are closely related genetically.

The prominent product for export is maca flour, a baking flour ground from the hard, dried roots. It is called harina de maca. Maca flour (powder) is a relatively inexpensive bulk commodity, like wheat flour or potato flour. The supplement industry uses both dry roots and maca flour for different types of processing and concentrated extracts. Another common form is maca, processed by gelatinization. This extrusion process separates and removes the tough fiber from the roots using gentle heat and pressure, as raw maca is difficult to digest due to its thick fibers.

Archaeological evidence exists for varying degrees of cultivation of maca in the Lake Junin region from around 1700 BC to 1200 AD. Maca has been harvested and used by humans in the puna grasslands of the Andean Mountains for centuries. Contrary to frequent claims that maca cultivation was common in what is today Peru, until the late 1980s, maca has been cultivated only in a limited area around Lake Junin in central Peru. Historically, maca was often traded for lowland tropical food staples, such as maize, rice, manioc (tapioca roots), quinoa, and papaya. It also was used as a form of payment for Spanish imperial taxes. In the late 1980s, it was commercially rediscovered at the Meseta de Bombón plateau near Lake Junin.

Due to its purported effect on fertility, maca grew in agricultural, commercial, and research interest from the 1990s to 2014. Market studies showed low acceptance of the particular maca taste by consumers when first exposed to it, creating a barrier for popularity of this food as a culinary vegetable. The economic interest existed more in the perceived but unproven health effects of the root's constituents supplied as an extract in a dietary supplement. By 2014, agricultural and market interest in maca grew in China, but with challenges from Peruvian institutions who accused Chinese companies of illegally exporting maca and of biopiracy, as several Chinese patents had been filed to improve maca's propagation and genetic diversity.

=== Traditional medicine ===
Maca is said to have medicinal properties, but scientific research remains inconclusive. A 2016 systematic review found evidence suggesting that it improves semen quality in healthy and infertile men. A 2011 systematic review found the evidence for the effectiveness of maca as a treatment for menopausal symptoms in women inconclusive.

== Regional names ==
Its Spanish and Quechua names include maca-maca, maino, ayak chichira, and ayak willku.
