= Kālua =

Traditional Hawaiian method of cooking

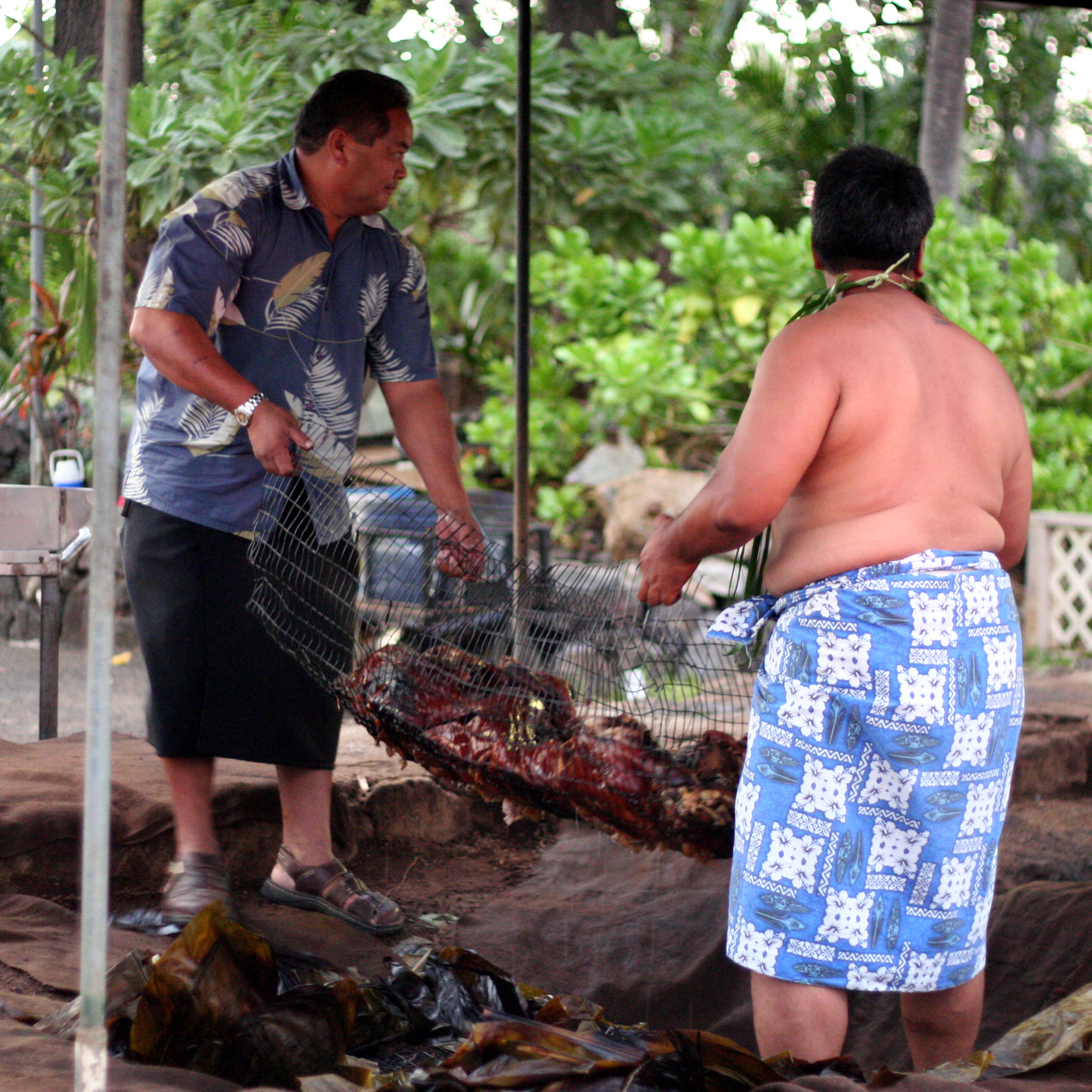
Kālua puaʻa (kālua pig)

Kālua (Hawaiian: [kaːˈlu.a]) is a traditional Hawaiian cooking method that utilizes an imu, a type of underground oven. The word "kālua" ("to cook in an underground oven" in the Hawaiian language) may also be used to describe the food cooked in this manner, such as kālua pig or kālua turkey, which are commonly served at lūʻau feasts. The word lūʻau is the Hawaiian name for the taro leaf, which, when young and small resembles cooked spinach after being steamed for a few hours. The traditional lūʻau was eaten on the floor over lauhala mats (leaves of the hala tree woven together).

== Cooking method ==
Traditionally, a hardwood fire is built inside a pit large enough to contain the food to be cooked, the stones, and the vegetation used to cover the food. Stones are placed on top of the fire in the pit, taking around two to three hours to reach their maximum temperature. Most important is the selection of stones that contain very little moisture to avoid stones exploding from the steam generated by the heat. Once the stones have become extremely hot, they are spread out over the coals and the pit is lined with vegetation, such as banana trees, that have been pounded to make them pliable. A layer of ti leaves (Cordyline fruticosa) is then spread over the layer of pounded vegetation and the food to be cooked placed on top. The meat to be cooked is salted and, if cooking a whole pig, some hot stones are placed inside the body cavity to ensure the meat is fully cooked.

To maintain even heating and to retain the meat's natural moisture, the meat is covered with more layers of vegetation such as ti and banana leaves, then covered with a layer of soil at least several inches deep ensuring that no steam escapes. The layers of vegetation covering the food must extend past the edges of the pit to ensure the food is not contaminated by the soil it is buried under. The meat is then left to cook in the pit for several hours. When the meat is fully cooked, it is removed from the imu and shredded.

=== Modern variations ===
Modern adaptations to the traditional cooking method include the use of wet burlap material as a substitute for the vegetation or to reduce the amount of vegetation needed, and also the use of non-galvanized steel chicken wire or mesh wrapped around the food to aid in its removal when cooked. The characteristic flavor of kālua pig is imparted by the smoke from the hardwood but more importantly the use of ti leaves to wrap the meat. The flavor of the ti leaf is what differentiates kālua pig from other methods of cooking a whole hog slowly using a hardwood fire.

== Kālua pig ==
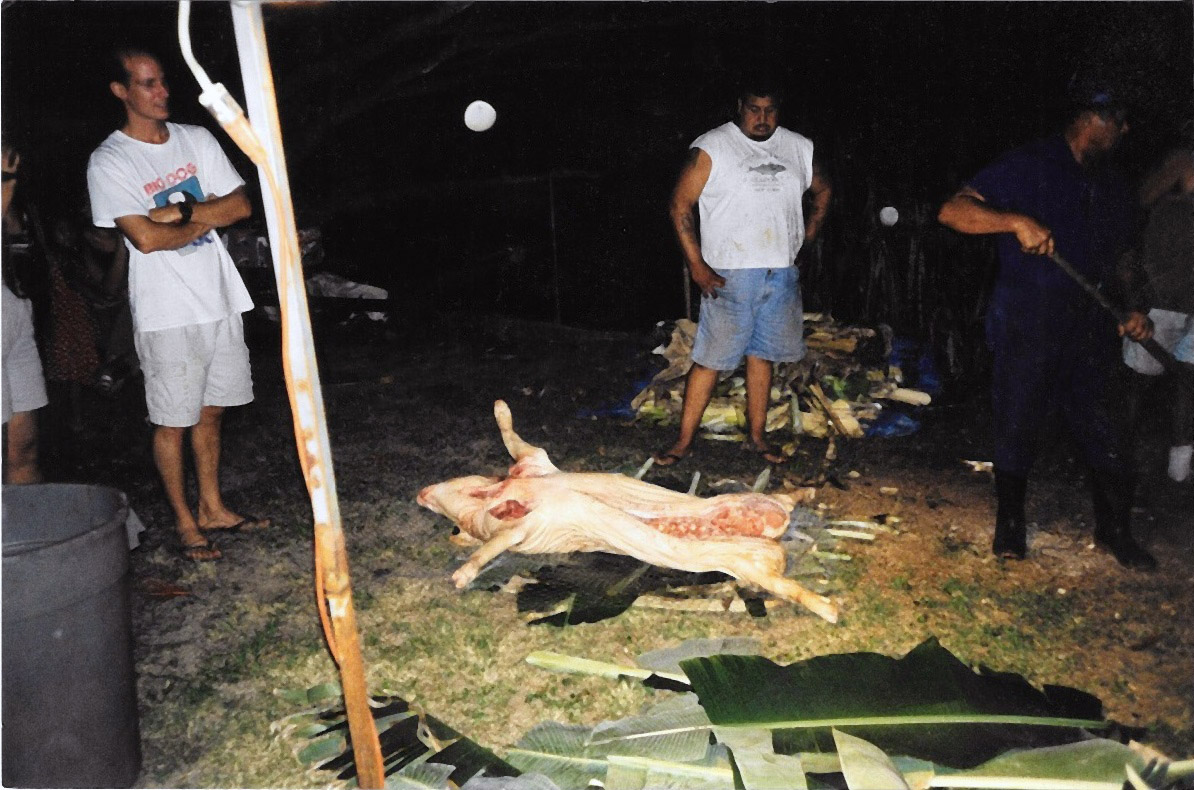
Preparing Hawaiian imu, to cook pig overnight, on Oahu, Hawaii

Kālua pig is a main tourist attraction at many lūʻau, though it is sometimes made using a gas or electric stove with artificial mesquite or kiawe liquid smoke. Other tourist businesses use substitutes instead of vegetation or use an imu pao, an above ground variation of the imu. The term "kālua pork" has been used by Hawaiian cook Sam Choy to describe pork shoulder butt which is rubbed with sea salt, wrapped in ti leaves, and slowly cooked in an oven using liquid mesquite smoke rather than a imu.

The dish is similar to vuaka vavi in Fiji, as well as puaʻa faunaʻa in Tahiti and the Marquesas Islands.

== See also ==
- Hawaiian cuisine
- Curanto
- Hāngī
- List of cooking techniques
- New England clam bake
- Pachamanca
- Pig roast
- Whole hog barbecue
- Pit barbecue
- Pit oven
