= Pachamanca =

Peruvian dish baked in an earthen oven

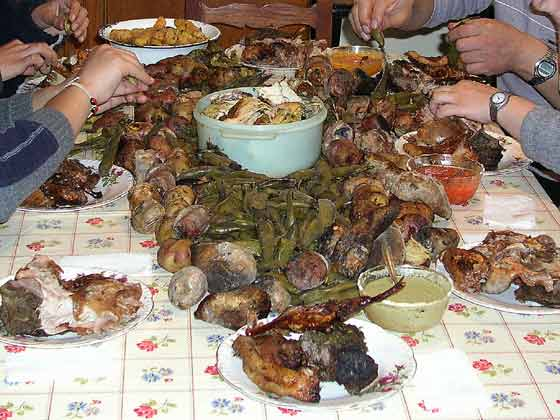
Pachamanca

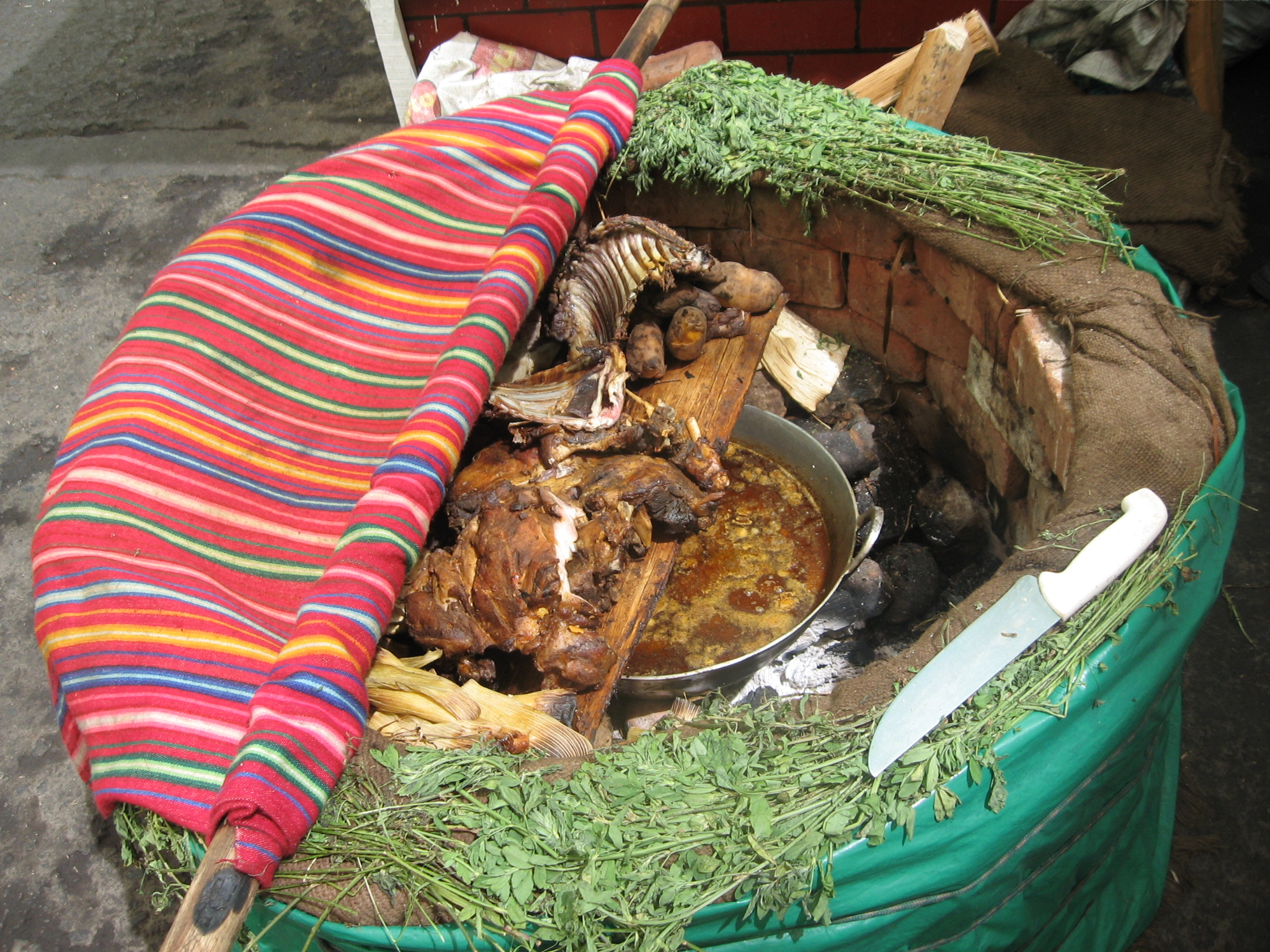
Pachamanca

Pachamanca (from Quechua pacha "earth", manka "pot") is a traditional Peruvian dish baked with the aid of hot stones. The earthen oven is known as a huatia. It is generally made of lamb, mutton, alpaca, llama, guanaco, vicuna, pork, beef, chicken, or guinea pig, marinated in herbs and spices. Other Andean produce, such as potato or chuño (naturally freeze-dried potato), habas (fresh green lima beans in pods), sweet potato, mashua, oca, ulluco, cassava, yacon, plantain, humitas (corn cakes), ears of corn, and chili, are often included in the baking.

The dish is primarily made in the central Peruvian Andes in three regions: 1) The upper Huallaga valley, in Huánuco and Pasco vicinity, where it is made with pork and seasoned with chincho and huacatay, two local herbs; 2) in the Mantaro valley and neighboring area around the cities Huancayo, Tarma, and Jauja, they use lamb and a different seasoning; and 3) in several places of the Ayacucho department. In the Peruvian Amazonia, the southern and northern Andes, and the mostly desertic coast, the dish is uncommon due to the lack of firewood or the type of stones needed without any content of sulphur. Meat is wrapped in marmaquilla or chincho leaves before being put in this kind of earthen stove.

This important part of Peruvian cuisine, which has existed since the time of the Inca Empire, has evolved over time. Its consumption is now widespread throughout modern Peru, where regional variations have appeared in the technical process of production, but not in the ingredients or their baking. The preparation is not only limited to Peru, but also exists with minimal variants in other Andean countries, such as Ecuador.

== History ==
Pachamanca dates back to pre-incan times, used in religious festivities and celebrations. It was made as a way to give back to the Incan earth goddess Pachamama. In certain parts of the country, this dish has a godmother and a godfather who are in charge of placing a cross and flowers on the buried food, which is a traditional custom in Andean festivals and celebrations. The definition of pachamanca is the combination of the words pacha and manca, pacha (earth) and manca (cooking pot). The heated stones symbolize Inti, the Sun God, and the source of warmth. The tradition of burying the food underground signifies a return to the womb of Pachamama. A band of musicians usually accompanies the proceedings, while chicha and beer are also served.

== Preparation ==
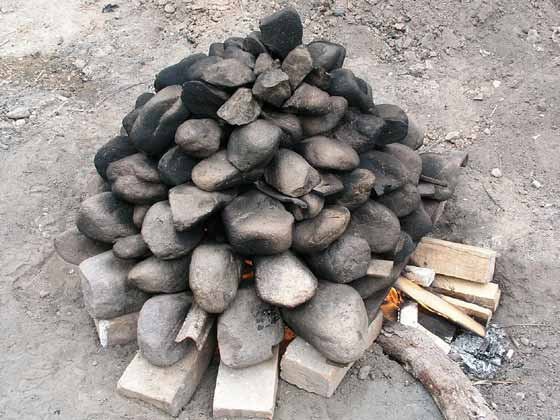

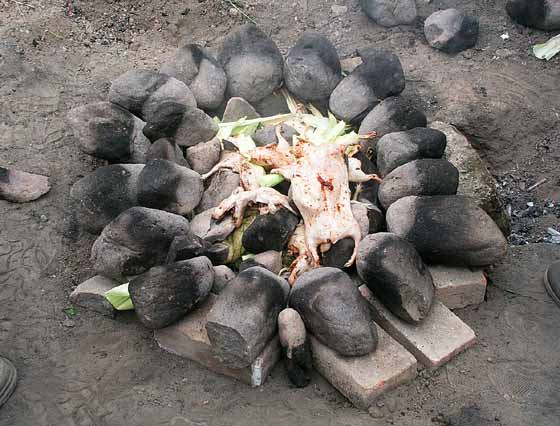

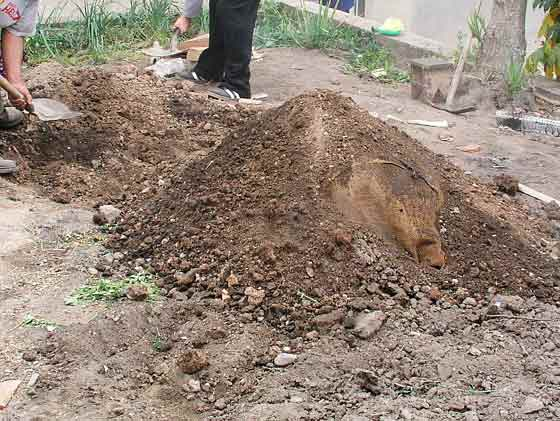

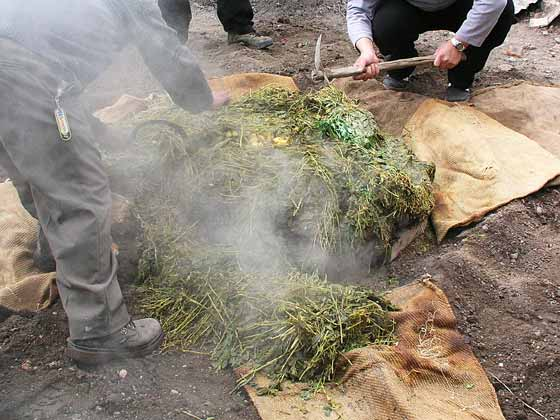

Preparation begins with the heating of stones over a fire, and the meat is then placed on top. The fire is covered with grass and earth, and the resulting oven is opened up after around two hours. Typically, a large quantity of meat is cooked, perhaps a whole sheep, to serve several people.

== See also ==
- Cabeza guateada (Argentina)
- Chuño
- Clam bake (New England)
- Curanto (Chile)
- Hāngī (New Zealand)
- Inca cuisine
- Kalua (Hawaii)
- Tocosh
