= Huatia =

Earthen oven

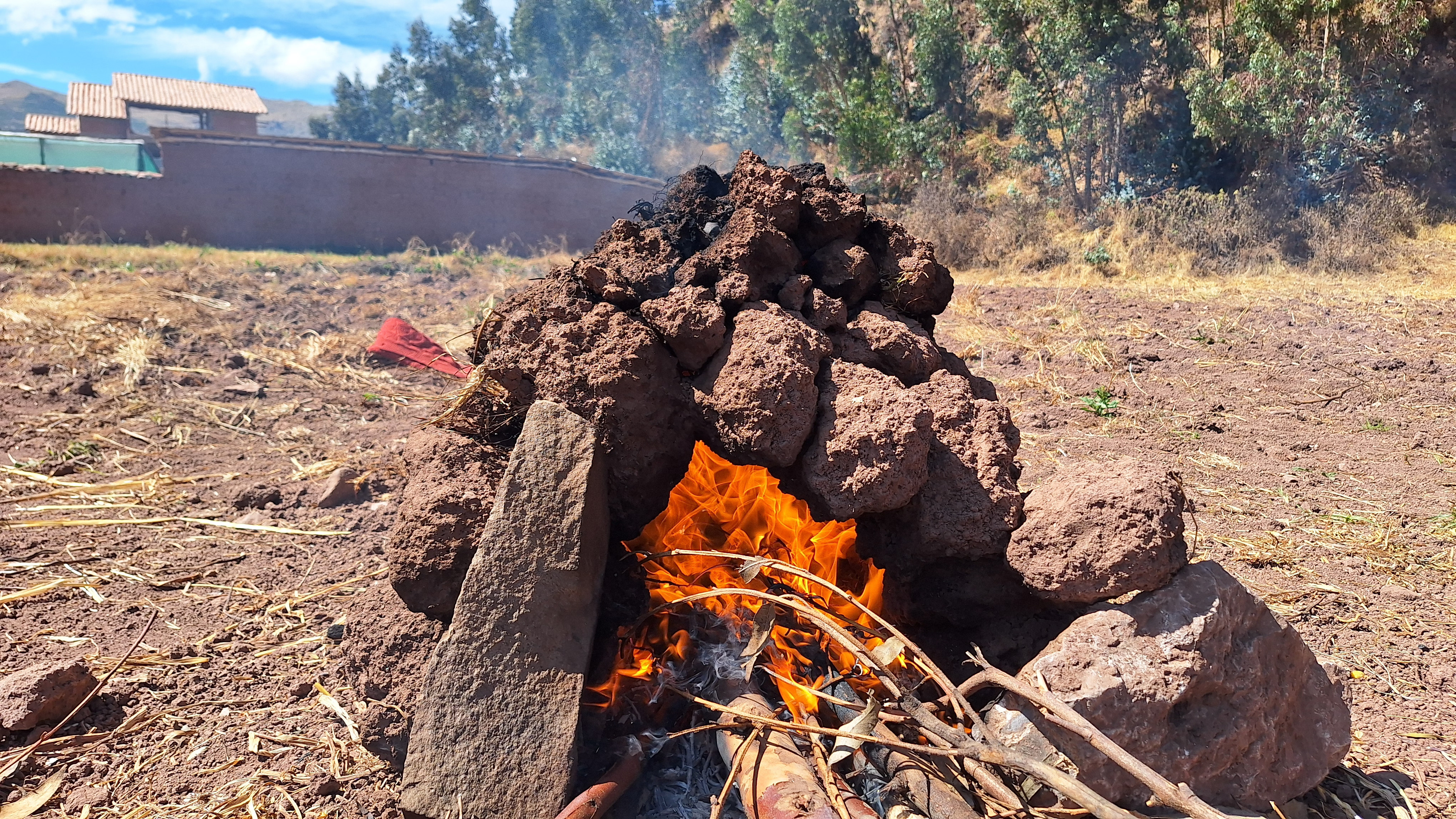
Huatia built with k'urpas

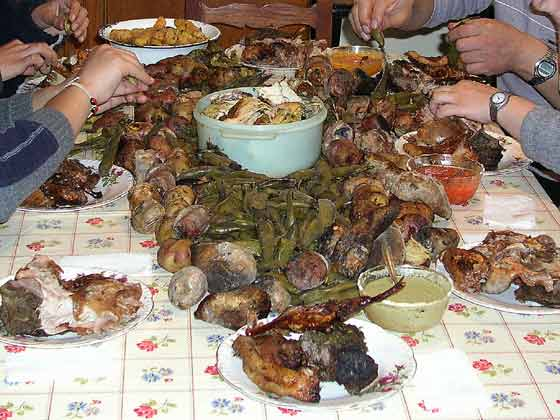
Pachamanca prepared using a huatia

A huatia (Spanish pronunciation: [ˈwatja]), watya or wathiya (Quechua pronunciation: [ˈwatja ~ waˈtʰɪja]) is an earthen oven which dates back to the Inca Empire. This type of oven is commonly associated with the peasants in the southern regions of the Andes in Peru, Bolivia, and Chile.

Although the term is often used simply to refer to any simple dirt cooking pit, this is not considered the proper way to build a huatia. The most traditional construction (although perhaps not the most common today) is to carefully build a dome or pyramid from rocks over a dirt pit using nothing but gravity to hold the dome together. This dome/pyramid must have an opening in which to place other rocks, kindling, and the food to be cooked. A fire is built inside (special rocks such as volcanic rocks must be selected which can resist the heat) until the rocks become sufficiently heated. Once the food (meat and potatoes most often in addition to herbs) is inside the dome/pyramid is allowed to collapse, either by the action of the heat or by manual intervention, to bury the food. It is then left to cook for many hours soaking up flavors from the surrounding soil. Although any fire in the pit is extinguished the heat remains for a long time. Eventually the food is dug out of the ground and served.

As a practical matter the pachamanca is today served in many parts of Peru even though the tradition of the huatia is changing (i.e. to simplify the cooking process). It can be debated whether the elaborate construction process of the traditional huatia really adds anything essential to the actual flavor of the food as opposed to simply burying the food. It is, nevertheless, part of the Peruvian heritage.

== See also ==
- Inca cuisine
- Peruvian cuisine
- Pachamanca
