= Contreras =

Contreras is a Spanish surname of toponymic origin, for "from the surrounding area". It is a common family name in the Spanish-speaking world.

== People ==
- Adán Amezcua Contreras (born c. 1969), Mexican co-leader (with his two younger brothers) of the Colima Cartel
- Alan Contreras (born 1956), American writer and ornithologist
- Albert Contreras (1933–2017), American artist
- Alejandro Contreras (born 1993), Chilean footballer
- Alonso de Contreras (1582–1641), Spanish soldier, sailor, privateer, adventurer and writer
- Ana Brenda Contreras (born 1986), Mexican-American singer and actress
- Andrés Contreras (1943–2014), Chilean agronomist and potato expert
- Anthony Contreras (born 2000), Costa Rican footballer
- Billy Contreras (born 1984), American jazz violinist and bluegrass fiddler
- Carlos Contreras (disambiguation), several people with this name
- Carme Contreras i Verdiales (1932–2020), Spanish actress
- Carmen Contreras-Bozak (1919–2017), American who was the first Hispanic to serve in the U.S. Women's Army Corps
- Carolina Contreras, Dominican businesswoman
- Cristián Contreras Molina (born 1946), Chilean disrobed Roman Catholic bishop
- Diego de Contreras (1562–1618), Mexican Roman Catholic Archbishop
- Dalia Contreras (born 1983), Venezuelan taekwondo athlete
- Edgar Contreras (surgeon) (born 1961), Dominican doctor and plastic surgeon
- Edgar Contreras (taekwondo) (born 1992), Venezuelan taekwondo athlete
- Eleazar López Contreras (1883–1973), Venezuelan politician and former president
- Elías Contreras (born 1997), Argentine footballer
- Elsa Patricia Galarza Contreras (born 1963), Peruvian economist
- Enrique Contreras III (born 1992), Mexican racing driver
- Francisco Contreras (boxer) (born 1984), Dominican boxer
- Gloria Contreras Roeniger (1934–2015), Mexican dancer and choreographer
- Gustavo Lozano Contreras (1938–2000), Colombian botanist
- Hidalgo Contreras (born 1969), Mexican politician
- Iván Contreras (born 1974), Mexican volleyball player
- Israel Contreras (born 1960), Venezuelan world champion boxer
- Jesús Amezcua Contreras (born c. 1975), Mexican co-leader (with his two older brothers) of the Colima Cartel
- Jesús Fructuoso Contreras (1866–1902), Mexican sculptor
- Johanna Contreras, American public official
- José Contreras (disambiguation), several people
- Karel Espino Contreras (born 2001), Cuban football player
- Karen Higuera Contreras (born 1991), Mexican beauty pageant titleholder
- K-Réena (born Katherine Macarena Contreras Contreras in 1986), Chilean singer
- Luis Amezcua Contreras (born c. 1974), Mexican co-leader (with his younger and older brother) of the Colima Cartel
- Luis Contreras (disambiguation), several people
- Manuel Contreras (1929–2015), Chilean head of intelligence during Pinochet's dictatorship
- Mar Contreras (born 1981), Mexican actress and singer
- Maria Contreras-Sweet (born 1955), Mexican-American administrator of the Small Business Administration
- María José Rienda Contreras (born 1975), Spanish alpine skier
- Mark Contreras (born 1995), American baseball player
- Michael Contreras (born 1993), Chilean footballer
- Miguel Contreras , American labor union leader
- Narciso Contreras (born 1975), Mexican documentary photojournalist
- Nardi Contreras (born 1951), American baseball player
- Néstor Contreras (born 1979), Chilean footballer
- Orlando Contreras (footballer) (born 1982), Peruvian footballer
- Orlando Contreras (singer) (1930–1994), Cuban Bolero singer
- Pablo Contreras (born 1978), Chilean football defender
- Paulo Garcés (born 1984), Chilean football goalkeeper
- Patricio Contreras (born 1947), Chilean actor
- Pedro Contreras (born 1972), Spanish football goalkeeper
- Pedro de Alvarado y Contreras (1485–1541), Spanish conquistador
- Patricia Mejía Contreras (1958–2007), Mexican sculptor and graphic artist
- Rey Paz Contreras (1950–2021), Filipino sculptor
- Roberto Contreras (1928–2000), American actor, father of Luis (above)
- Rodrigo Contreras (born 1995), Argentine footballer
- Rudolph Contreras (born 1962), United States District Court judge
- Salustiano Contreras (18??–19??), Cuban baseball player
- Sebastián Contreras (born 1988), Chilean footballer
- Sergio Contreras (born 1980), Mexican baseball player
- Silvia Contreras (born 1993), Mexican flag football player
- Víctor Contreras (field hockey) (born 1941), Mexican field hockey player
- Víctor Contreras (rower) (born 1961), Chilean rower
- Víctor Contreras Ruíz (born 1980), Mexican organist and orchestral conductor
- William Contreras (born 1997), Venezuelan baseball player
- Willson Contreras (born 1992), Venezuelan baseball player
- Wilson Contreras (born 1967), Chilean footballer
- Yeferson Contreras (born 1999), Colombian footballer
- Yeny Contreras (born 1979), Chilean taekwondo athlete
- Yidiel Contreras (born 1992), Spanish hurdler
- Yuderqui Contreras (born 1986), Dominican weightlifter

== See also ==
- Battle of Contreras, during the Mexican–American War
- Contreras, Province of Burgos, a municipality in Castile and León, Spain
- Contreras Island, an island in deep southern Chile
- Magdalena Contreras, borough of the Mexican Federal District
- Contreiras, Portuguese variant of the surname
