= Potato bread =

Bread made with potato and flour

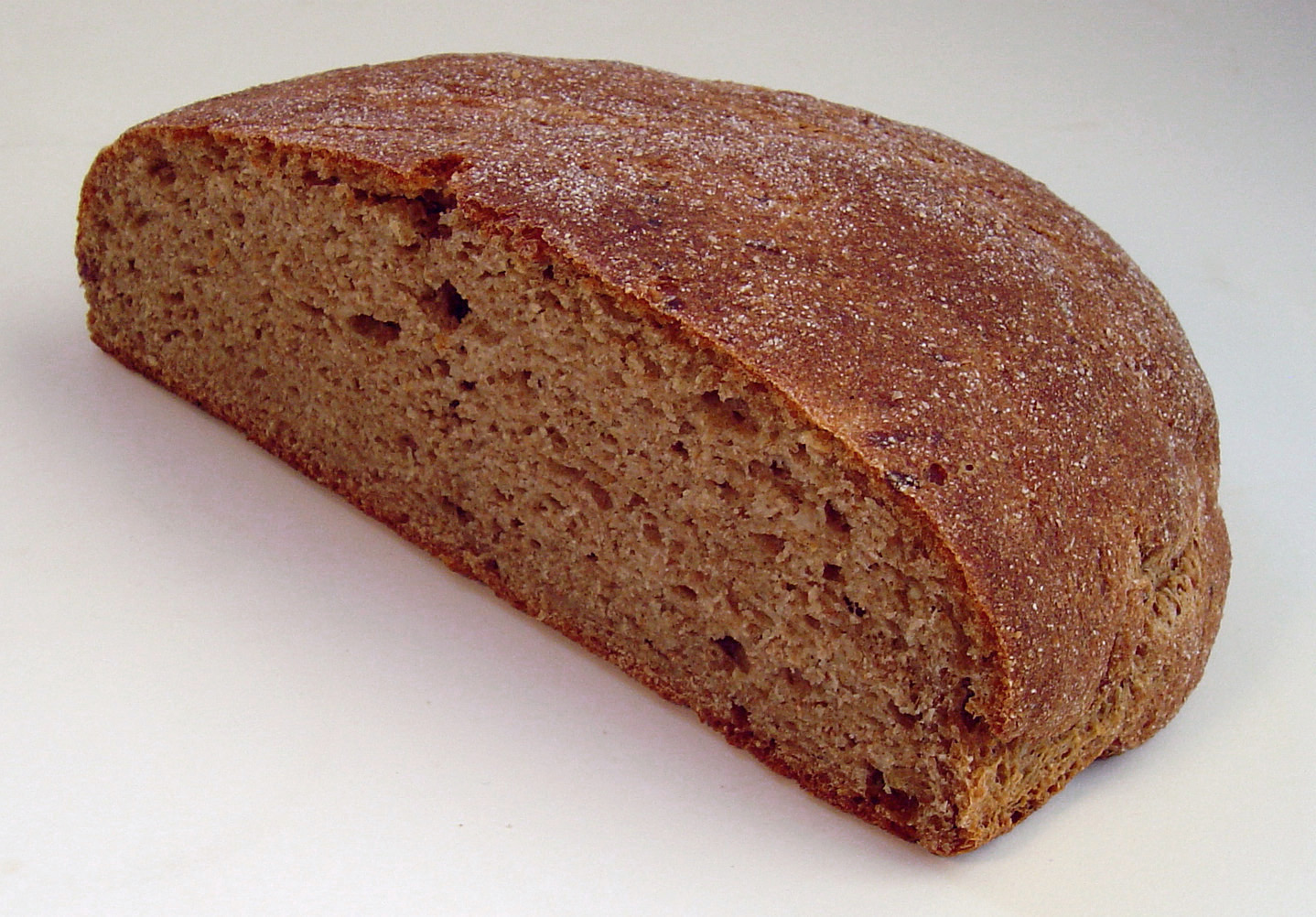
- Potato bread
- Type: Bread
- Main ingredients: Potato, flour, wheat flour

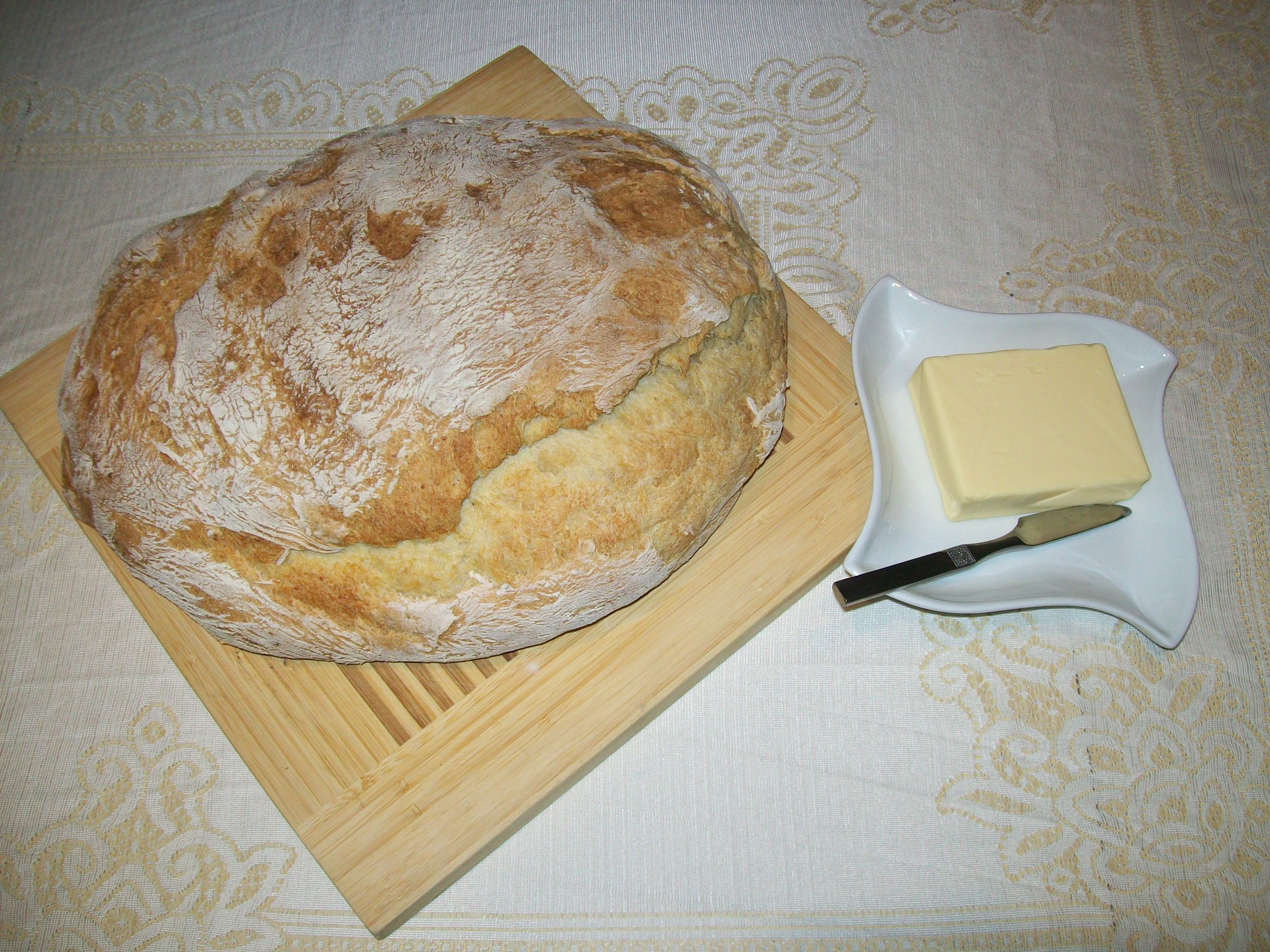
Potato bread with butter

Potato bread is a form of bread in which potato flour or potato replaces a portion of the regular wheat flour. It is cooked in a variety of ways, including baking it on a hot griddle or pan, or in an oven. It may be leavened or unleavened, and may have a variety of other ingredients baked into it. The ratio of potato to wheat flour varies significantly from recipe to recipe, with some recipes having a majority of potato, and others having a majority of wheat flour. Some recipes call for mashed potatoes, while others call for dehydrated potato flakes. It is available as a commercial product in many countries, with similar variations in ingredients, cooking methods, and other variables.

== Alternative names ==
Potato bread goes by many regional names, including slims, fadge, potato cake, potato farls, and tatie bread in Ireland. "Potato cake" can actually refer to numerous dishes.

== Varieties ==
=== Brazil ===
Brazilian potato bread is usually a light airy bread, made in small round loaves with potatoes or potato flour mixed with wheat flour, milk, eggs and yeast and then baked. It can also be found with Catupiry filling and is usually consumed as a snack all over the country.

=== Chile ===
Potato bread, in different forms, is a common element of the cuisine of Chiloé in Southern Chile. The most popular breads are milcao and chapalele, which are part of the traditional curanto.

=== Germany ===
Kartoffelbrot (German: [kaʁˈtɔfl̩ˌbʁoːt]) is a potato bread that may contain spelt and rye flour.

Berches is a German-Jewish bread made for Shabbat. Like other Ashkenazi challot, it is typically braided, but unlike the sweet, eggy challah of eastern Ashkenazi cuisine, berches bread contains boiled, mashed, and cooled potato, and has no egg and very little sugar in the dough. Some recipes contain oil, and some do not. It is often topped with an egg wash (even if there is no egg incorporated into the dough itself), and poppy seeds. While there are few German Jews left living in Germany, the tradition of making berches has been carried on by non-Jewish bakers, who are aware of the bread's Jewish history.

=== Hungary ===
Potato bread is a part of the cuisine of Hungary.

=== Northern Ireland and Republic of Ireland ===
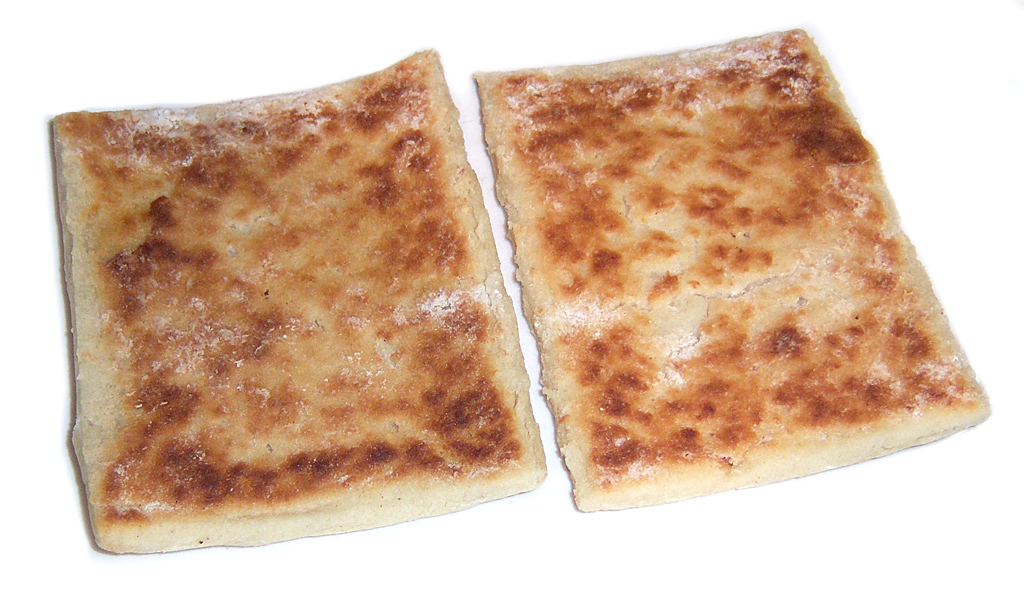
Potato cakes (or bread) commonly form part of an Ulster fry

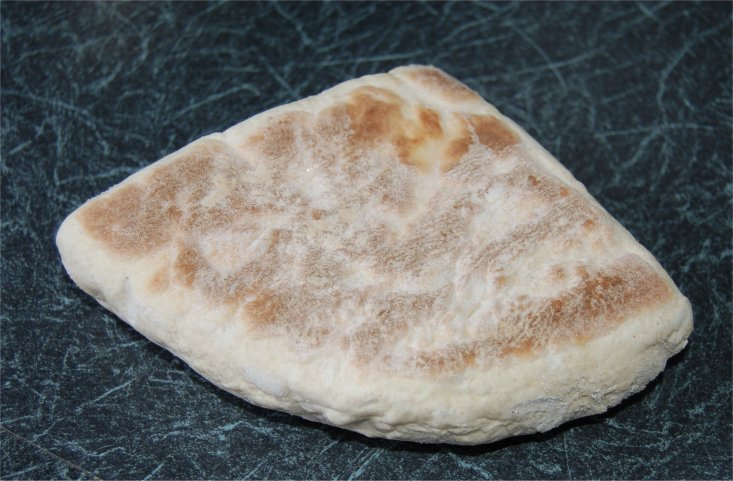
Soda farl

On the island of Ireland, potato bread or cakes known as boxty (Irish: bacstaí) were popular, and may have been a result of the floury types of potatoes that were common in the country.

A potato farl is one large round piece of soft potato bread divided into four quadrants or square slices (usually around 0.5–1 cm in thickness), lightly powdered with flour, common in Ulster, especially in Northern Ireland. They are traditionally used as one of the distinguishing items of food in an Ulster fry, for which they are shallow-fried on both sides for a short time and served with soda farls cooked in the same way. They can also be grilled and buttered, or eaten with a variety of toppings.

Apple potato cake or "fadge" was cooked in Ireland in the autumn, when cooking apples were available, and was very popular in the north-east of the country. Freshly cooked potatoes are mixed with melted butter, salt, and flour. This is a potato bread wrapped, pastry-like, around a sweet filling of apples.

=== Italy ===
Focaccia pugliese is a variety of focaccia from the southern Italian region of Apulia. It is topped with tomatoes, olives, and fresh herbs, such as oregano.

=== Poland ===
Okrągły chleb kartoflany is a light and airy potato bread.

=== Scotland ===
The Scottish tattie scone, also known as a "tottie scone" or "potato scone", is similar to the Irish potato farl. They are generally shaped as one large round divided into four quadrants, in a similar fashion to traditional Scottish oatcakes, or as small rounds.

=== United States ===
Potato bread is commercially available in the United States as a light and airy bread very similar to normal mass-produced white bread, but with a yellow tint, thicker texture, and a light potato flavor. Martin's Famous Pastry Shoppe, a large manufacturer of potato bread products, announced plans to build a 295,000-square-foot (27,400 m^{2}) facility in Chambersburg, Pennsylvania in 2024.

== See also ==
- List of breads
- List of Irish dishes
- List of potato dishes
- Potato pancake
