= Amezcua =

Amezcua or Amézcua is a Spanish surname. This Surname is mainly used in Latin America, and Spain.

== Notable people ==
Notable people with this surname include:

- Adán Amezcua Contreras, Mexican drug trafficker
- Alejandro Amezcua, Mexican canoer
- Carlos Amezcua, American journalist
- Efraín Amézcua, Mexican footballer
- Jesús Amezcua Contreras, Mexican drug trafficker
- Luis Amezcua Contreras, Mexican drug trafficker
