= Amezcua Contreras =

Amezcua Contreras is a surname. Notable people with the surname include:

- Adán Amezcua Contreras (born c. 1969), Mexican drug trafficker
- Jesús Amezcua Contreras (born c. 1975), Mexican drug trafficker
- Luis Amezcua Contreras (born c. 1974), Mexican drug trafficker
