= Víctor Contreras =

Víctor Contreras may refer to:

- Víctor Contreras (field hockey)
- Víctor Contreras (rower)
- Víctor Contreras Ruíz, Mexican organist, harpsichordist and orchestral conductor
