= Cuisine of Chiloé =

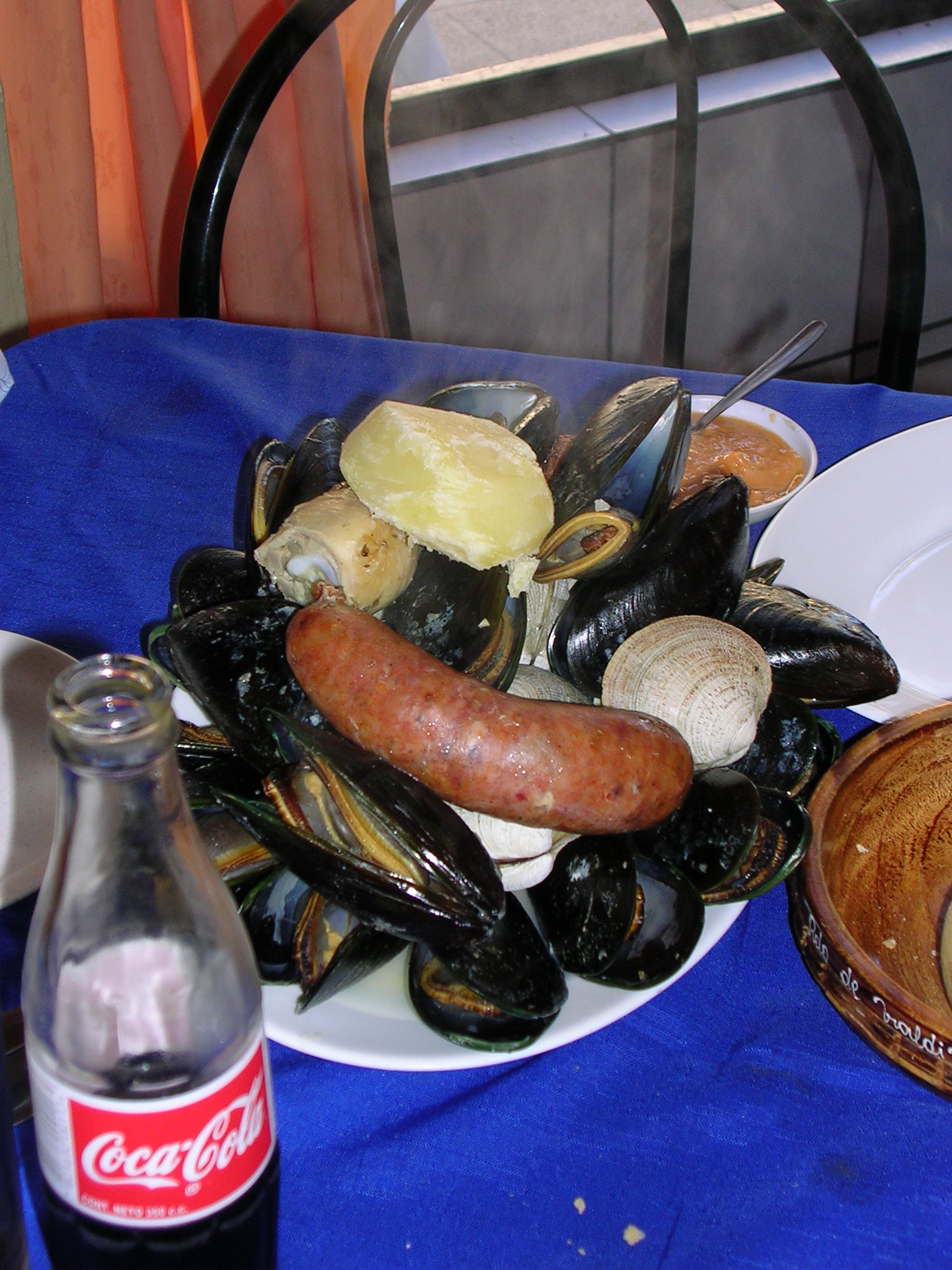
Picture of a curanto a la olla

The cuisine of Chiloé is a distinct form of cuisine from Chiloé Archipelago. The current cuisine of Chiloé emerged from the fusion of Chiloé's indigenous Chono cuisine with those of Huilliche and Spanish invaders. One of the main characteristics of the cuisine of Chiloé is the use of earth ovens and extensive use of shellfish and of the different potato varieties of Chiloé.

== List of dishes ==
- Cazuela chilota
- Chapaleles
- Chochoca
- Curanto
- Milcao
- Pulmay or curanto a la olla

== Beverages ==
- Licor de oro
- Murtado

== Sources ==
- LA COCINA CHILOTA: EL GENUINO LUGAR DE ENCUENTRO DE UNA COMUNIDAD BORDE MARINA
