= José Contreras (disambiguation) =

José Contreras (born 1971) is a Cuban Major League Baseball pitcher.

José Contreras may also refer to:

- José Castellanos Contreras (1893–1977), Salvadoran military officer and diplomat who rescued Jews during the Holocaust
- José Alirio Contreras (born 1978), Venezuelan cyclist
- José Contreras (footballer, born 1982), Chilean football right-back
- José Manuel Contreras (born 1986), Guatemalan football midfielder
- José Contreras (footballer, born 1994), Venezuelan football goalkeeper
- José Miguel Contreras, Canadian rock singer and guitarist of By Divine Right
- José Contreras (luthier) (c. 1710 – c. 1780), Spanish violin maker
- José-Meliton Contreras (1741–1791), Spanish violin maker, son of José

== See also ==
- Joseph Contreras (born 2008), American baseball player
- Contreras surname
