= Cancato =

Chilean dish

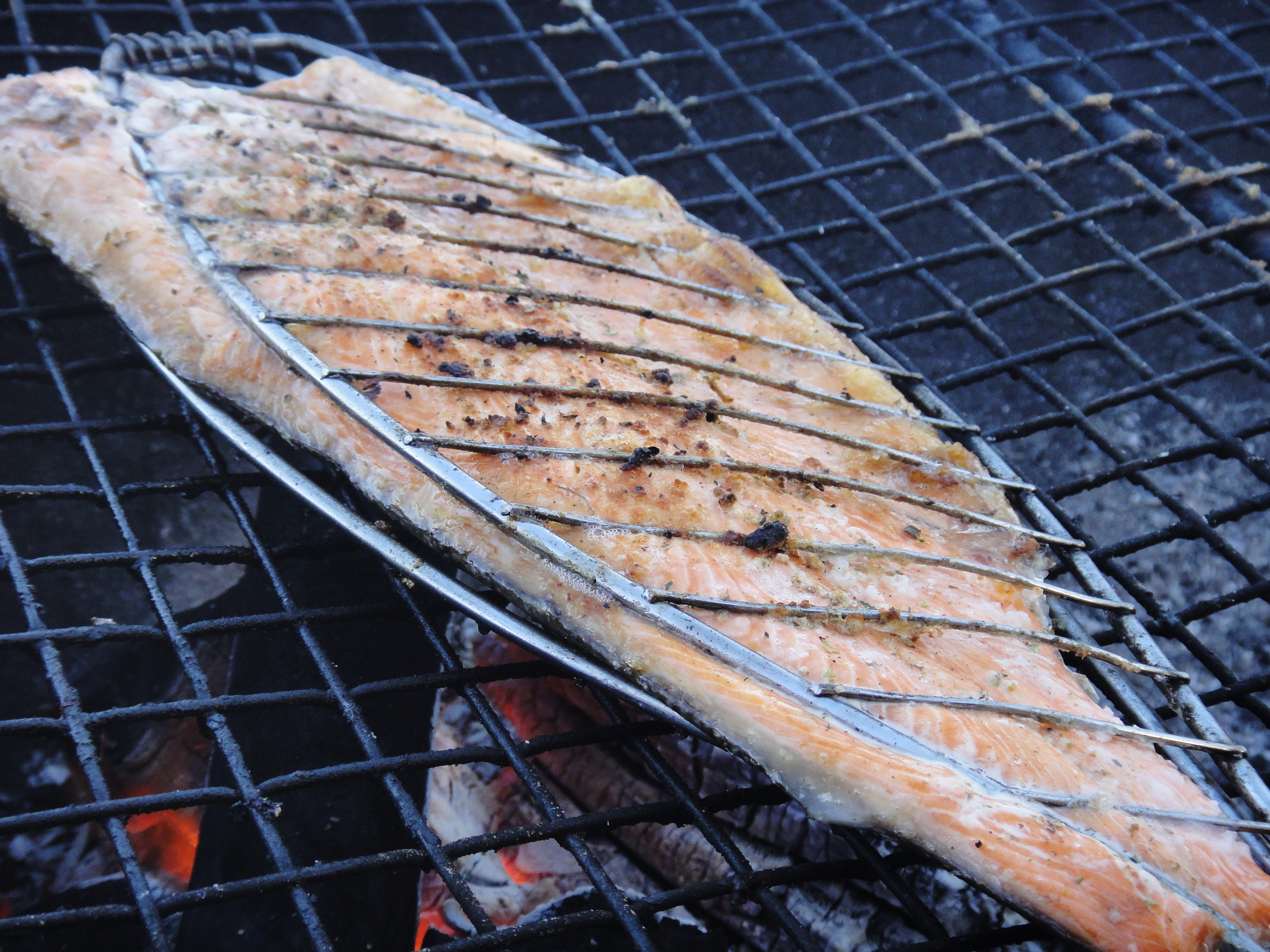
- Place of origin: Chile

Cancato is a typical roasted fish dish from the cuisine from southern Chile, especially from the cuisine of Chiloé and the cuisine of the Llanquihue Province.

== Preparation ==
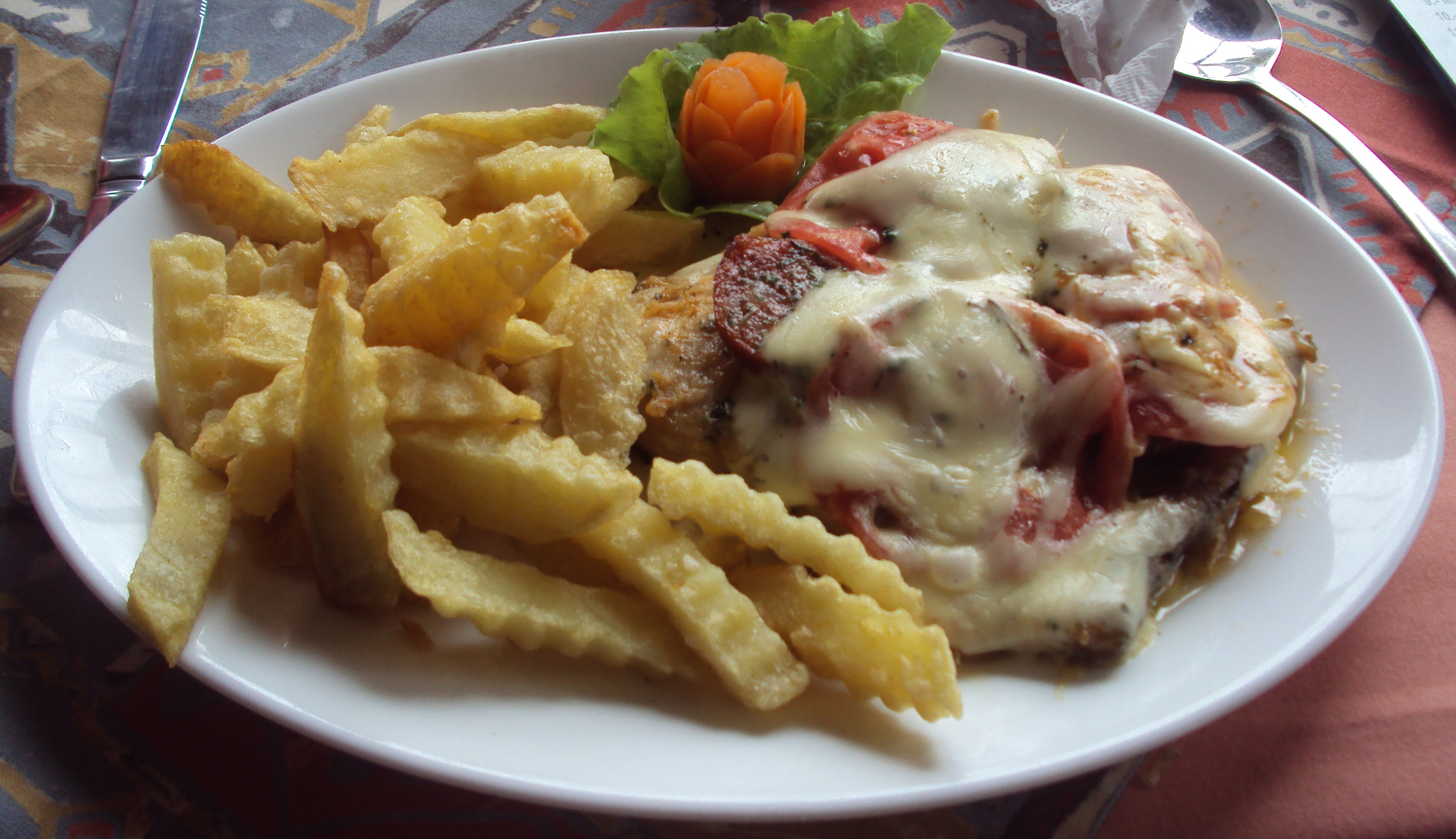
A cancato de sierra with cheese, longaniza and tomato, accompanied by french fries.

For preparing cancato, firm-fleshed fish are used, such as sierra mackerel or, since the late 20th century, salmon. The traditional method involves opening a fish and inserting small pieces of wood, such as quila rods , to keep it open, then securing it inside a split branch stuck in the ground and roasting it over a fire. There are also special grills or "cancateras" made of two hinged pieces, allowing the fish to be placed inside and rotated easily.

In local restaurants, a baked version of this dish is sold. In this case, one or two pieces of salmon are usually baked until golden brown, but still moist. Before it reaches the desired doneness, sliced tomatoes and sausage are added on top or inside, followed by sliced cheese drizzled with a little oil and sprinkled with oregano. It is removed from the oven and served once the cheese has melted sufficiently.

== Etymology ==
The term cancato is of Mapuche origin, since in Mapudungun, kangkatu and kangka mean 'roasted meat', derived from kangkan ('to roast'), taken in turn from a Quechua verb with the same meaning. The Mapuche expression passed into Chilote Spanish as "canca" ('roasted') and "hacer canca" ('to roast'); then, "hacer cancato" designated the specific activity of "roasting fish".

== See also ==
- Chilean cuisine
- List of fish dishes
