= Colima Cartel =

Drug cartel from Mexico

- Founded: 1988-2005
- Founded by: Jesús Amezcua Contreras
- Founding location: Colima, Mexico
- Ethnicity: Mexican
- Criminal activities: Drug trafficking, money laundering, extortion, murder and arms trafficking
- Allies: Sinaloa Cartel; Guadalajara Cartel; Milenio Cartel; Sonora Cartel

The Colima Cartel (Spanish: Cártel de Colima) was a Mexican drug trafficking and methamphetamine producing cartel operating in Guadalajara, Jalisco. It was founded and led by José de Jesús Amezcua Contreras and supported by his brothers Adán and Luis.

The Colima Cartel is believed to have obtained large quantities of the precursor ephedrine through contacts in Thailand and India, and then distributed it to different methamphetamine labs in Mexico and the United States.

The Colima cartel has become a branch of the Sinaloa Cartel as are the Milenio Cartel, Guadalajara Cartel, and Sonora Cartels.

== History ==
The U.S. Drug Enforcement Administration (DEA) traces the foundations of the Colima Cartel in 1988. What separated the Colima Cartel from other trafficking operations was their control of the methamphetamine trade, instead of receiving a percentage of goods smuggled for Colombian cartels. The cartel was able to pact with the previous motorcycle gangs and independent traffickers who once dominated the methamphetamine trade in the U.S. The cartel was created in 1988 and originally it only operated by trafficking cocaine for the Colombian cartels, but later turned into trafficking and processing of methamphetamine.

By 1992 the Colima Cartel, through operations as a business, was able to establish amphetamine contacts in Switzerland, India, Germany and the Czech Republic. The DEA has reported the Colima Cartel recruited relatives to operate at the first two tiers of their organization, "insulating the structure." Relatives and close friends comprised the first two tiers who then recruited low level, non related individuals to operate the methamphetamine elaboration process and the smuggling into the United States.

== Arrests ==
On November 10, 1997, Adán Amezcua was arrested in his hometown of Colima on weapons charges.

On June 1, 1998, Luis and Jesús Amezcua were arrested in Guadalajara, Jalisco, by agents from the Mexican former counter-narcotics agency, the Fiscalía Especial para Atención a los Delitos contra la Salud (FEADS). He is being held in the maximum security prison of Almoloya, sentenced to 49 years in prison.

The Colima Cartel at the time of the arrests of Luis and Jesús was believed to be "the most prominent methamphetamine trafficking organization operating ... as well as the leading supplier of chemicals to other methamphetamine trafficking organizations" Within nine days of their arrest, the New York Times reported two of the three charges Luis and Jesús Amezcua Contreras were facing were dropped. Judge José Nieves Luna Castro dropped from each, one count of criminal association and money laundering, saying they had been charged under statutes that were not in effect at the time of their alleged crimes, leaving one remaining charge for each of the brothers.

May 2001, Adán Amezcua was arrested on money laundering charges.

In May 2002, a federal court blocked the scheduled extradition of José de Jesús Amezcua to the United States to face drug trafficking charges because the U.S. extradition request did not comply with Mexico's requirement that extradited criminals not face the possibility of capital punishment or a life sentence. In the year 2005, authorities arrested 1,785 collaborators of this cartel. Despite this, the Colima Cartel continues operating in the states of Baja California, Nuevo León, Aguascalientes, Jalisco, Colima, Michoacán and Mexico City.

== Leadership ==
In October 2008, authorities of the U.S. Department of Treasury, on the basis of financial information and arrests of drug traffickers, identified that the Amezcua Contreras Organization has a two leaders who are still at large: Patricia Amezcua Contreras, (sister of Adan, Jesus and Luis) who was responsible for the overall operations, and Telesforo Baltazar Tirado Escamilla, who with his company Collins Group directed traffic of pseudoephedrine. They had been helped by their sons and lieutenants Rolando, Luis Alfonso Tirado Diaz and Trinidad Ramirez (Compa Trini) By this point in time, however, the Colima Cartel was listed as having only lieutenants and Pseudoephedrine Diversion operatives and not an actual leader.

== See also ==
- Illegal drug trade
- Mexican drug war
