= Reginald Shepherd =

American poet (1963–2008)

- Born: April 10, 1963; New York City, U.S.
- Died: September 10, 2008 (aged 45); Pensacola, Florida, U.S.
- Education: Bennington College; Brown University (MFA); Iowa Writers' Workshop (MFA)
- Occupation: Poet

Reginald Shepherd (April 10, 1963 – September 10, 2008) was an American poet and teacher. His latest publication, The Selected Shepherd: Poems, appeared in 2024.

== Biography ==
Reginald Shepherd was born in New York City and raised in the Bronx. Shepherd, African-American and gay, graduated from Bennington College in 1988, and received MFAs from Brown University and the University of Iowa, where he attended the prestigious Iowa Writers' Workshop. In his last year at the University of Iowa, he received the "Discovery" prize from the 92nd Street Y, and his first collection, Some Are Drowning (1994), was chosen by Carolyn Forché for the Association of Writers & Writing Programs Award in Poetry. He began his teaching career in the Stonecoast MFA Program in Creative Writing and later taught at Northern Illinois University and Cornell University.

Shepherd died of cancer in Pensacola, Florida, in 2008.

== Career and recognition ==
Shepherd's poetry collections include: Red Clay Weather (2011); Fata Morgana (2007), winner of the Silver Medal of the 2007 Florida Book Awards; Otherhood (2003), a finalist for the 2004 Lenore Marshall Poetry Prize; Wrong (1999); and Angel, Interrupted (1996).

He is also the author of A Martian Muse: Further Essays on Identity, Politics, and the Freedom of Poetry (published posthumously in 2010), Orpheus in the Bronx: Essays on Identity, Politics, and the Freedom of Poetry (2007) and the editor of The Iowa Anthology of New American Poetries (2004) and of Lyric Postmodernisms (2008).

Shepherd's work has been widely anthologized, including in four editions of The Best American Poetry and two Pushcart Prize anthologies. His honors and awards include grants from the National Endowment for the Arts, the Illinois Arts Council, the Florida Arts Council, and the Guggenheim Foundation. His 2008 book of essays, Orpheus in the Bronx, was a finalist for the National Book Critics Circle Award in Criticism.

== Books ==
=== Poetry ===
- Some Are Drowning (Pittsburgh, PA: University of Pittsburgh Press, 1994)
- Angel, Interrupted (University of Pittsburgh Press, 1996)
- Wrong (University of Pittsburgh Press, 1999)
- Otherhood (University of Pittsburgh Press, 2003)
- Itinerary (Maryville, MO: Green Tower Press) ISBN 1887240055
- Fata Morgana (University of Pittsburgh Press, 2007)
- Red Clay Weather (University of Pittsburgh Press, 2011)
- The Selected Shepherd: Poems, Selected & Introduced by Jericho Brown (University of Pittsburgh Press, 2024) ISBN 978-0822948216

=== Criticism ===
- A Martian Muse: Further Readings on Identity, Politics, and the Freedom of Poetry (Poets on Poetry Series, University of Michigan Press, 2010)
- Orpheus in the Bronx: Essays on Identity, Politics, and the Freedom of Poetry (Poets on Poetry Series, University of Michigan Press, 2008)

=== Anthologies ===
- The Iowa Anthology of New American Poetries (University of Iowa Press, 2004)
- Lyric Postmodernisms (Counterpath Press, 2008)

=== Letters ===
- Song After All: Letters of Reginald Shepherd and Alan Contreras (CraneDance Publications, 2013)
