= Carlos Contreras =

Carlos Contreras may refer to:

== Sports ==
=== Football ===
- Carlos Contreras (footballer, born 1938) (1938–2020), Chilean football defender
- Carlos Contreras (footballer, born 1972), Venezuelan footballer
- Carlos Contreras (footballer, born 1991), Honduran footballer
- Carlos Contreras (footballer, born 1995), Chilean football midfielder
- Carlos Herrera Contreras (born 1983), Chilean footballer

=== Other sports ===
- Carlos Contreras (baseball) (born 1991), Dominican baseball pitcher
- Carlos Contreras (racing driver) (born 1970), Mexican NASCAR driver
- Carlos Alberto Contreras (born 1973), Colombian road cyclist
- Aníbal, Carlos Ignacio Carrillo Contreras (1940–1994), Mexican professional wrestler

== Other people ==
- Carlos Contreras Aponte, Puerto Rican civil engineer
- Carlos López Contreras, Honduran politician
- Vittorio Vidali (1900–1983), also known as Carlos Contreras, Italian communist militant and politician
