= Contreiras =

Contreiras is a surname in Portuguese language. Notable people with this surname include:

- Carlos Contreiras, Angolan politician
- Diogo de Contreiras, 16th century Portuguese painter
- Rogério Contreiras (1922–1990), Portuguese footballer

== See also ==
- Contreras, Spanish variant of the surname
