= Chochoca =

Chilean potato dish

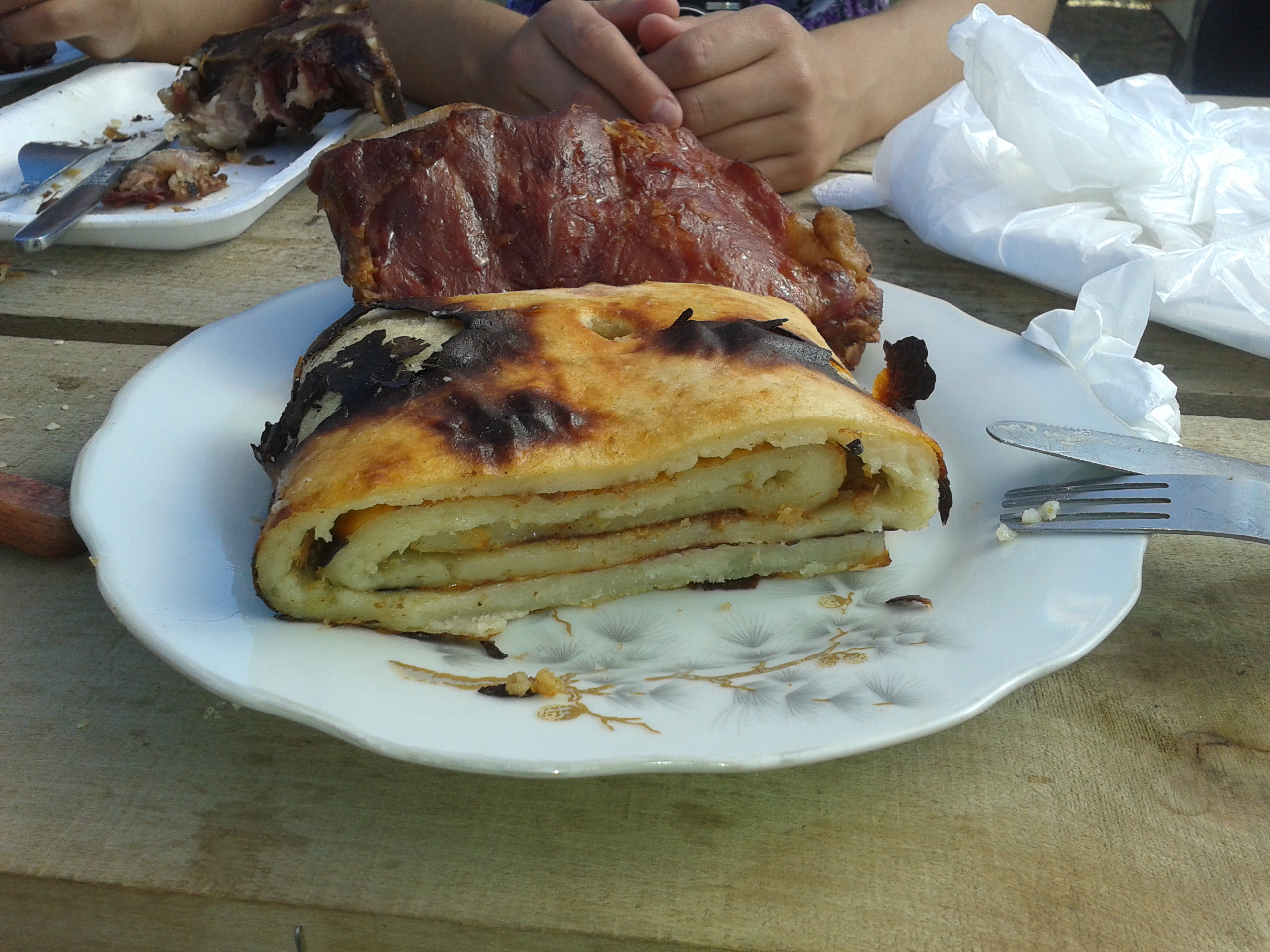
Chochoca served with smoked pork

Chochoca, chochoyeco, trotroyeco or trutru is a traditional dish in Chiloé and Huilliche cuisine in Chile. It consists of a dough of grated raw potatoes mixed with cooked potatoes—or of cooked potatoes mixed with flour—that is roasted over the fire on a large spit shaped like a rolling pin, which is known as a palo chochoquero.

== Preparation ==
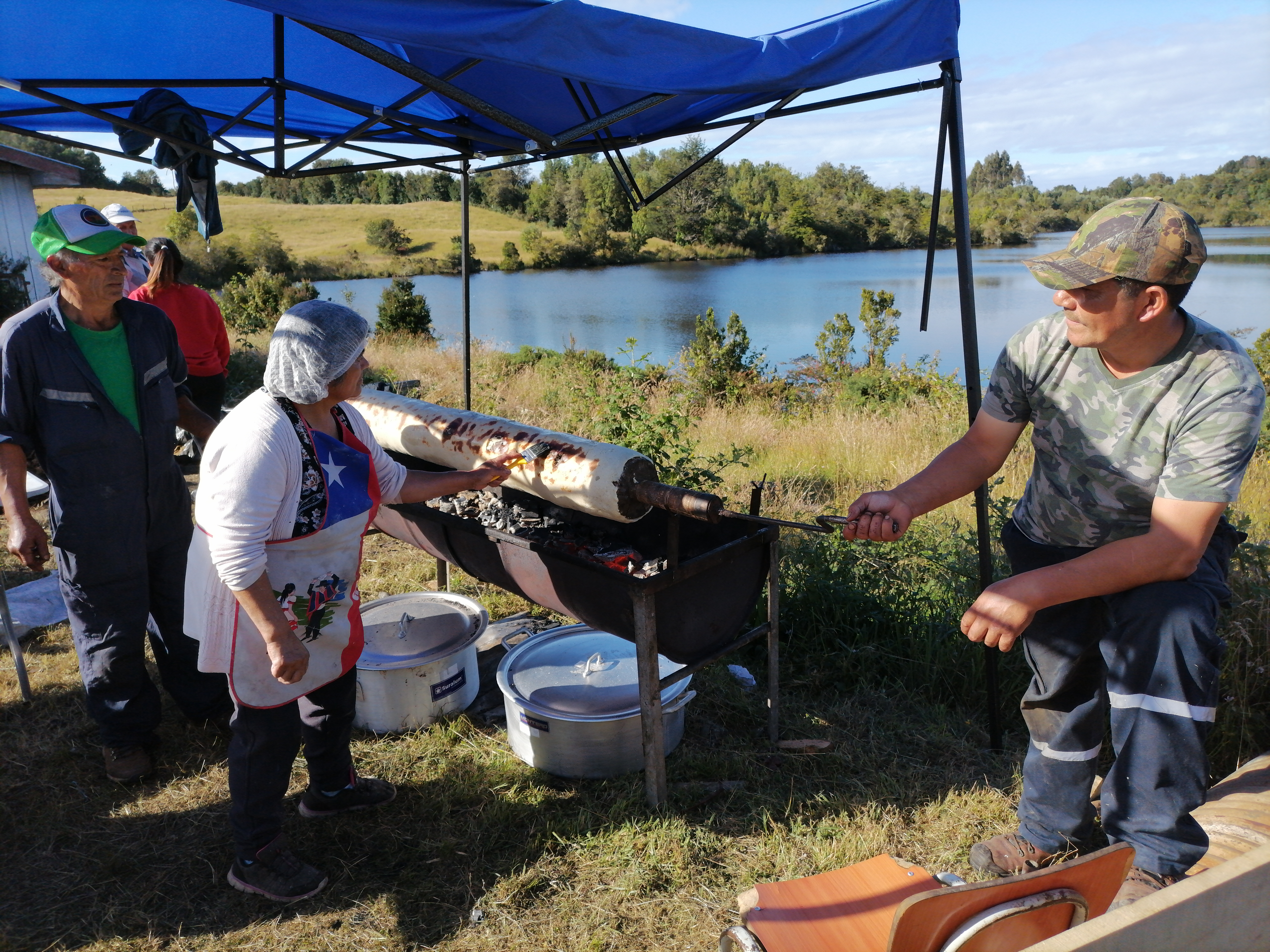
A chochoca roasts in Calen, a small town in Chiloé.

There are two varieties of chochoca that differ in the type of dough they use. The negra (black) uses a combination of raw and cooked potatoes, as is used for milcao, while the blanca (white) uses a mix of cooked potatoes and flour, as is used in the similar Chiloé dishes tortilla de papa and cema. Chochoca negra is more traditional and is made with grated raw potatoes that have been squeezed dry with a dish cloth and then mixed with mashed cooked potatoes, salt, and pig lard. However, chochoca blanca is more common today. Its dough is made of equal parts wheat flour and mashed cooked potatoes.

After the dough is ready, it is shaped into flat rectangles of 50 to 60 cm (19.5 to 23.5 in) in length and 50 cm wide, and just over 1 cm (about 1/2 inch) high, which are wrapped around a spit shaped like a large rolling pin, known as a palo chochoquero, which measures about 1.5 m (4.9 ft) long not counting its handles. The strips of dough are placed next to each other completely covering the spit and overlapping slightly so they form one solid piece. The surface of the spit is covered in lard to help the dough adhere.

The dish is cooked over the embers, turning slowly as you would roasted meat, for around 30 minutes. Once cooked, it is cut into portions and stuffed with chicharrón or llides (small scraps of meat left in the lard after a reitimiento, then rolled up and served hot.

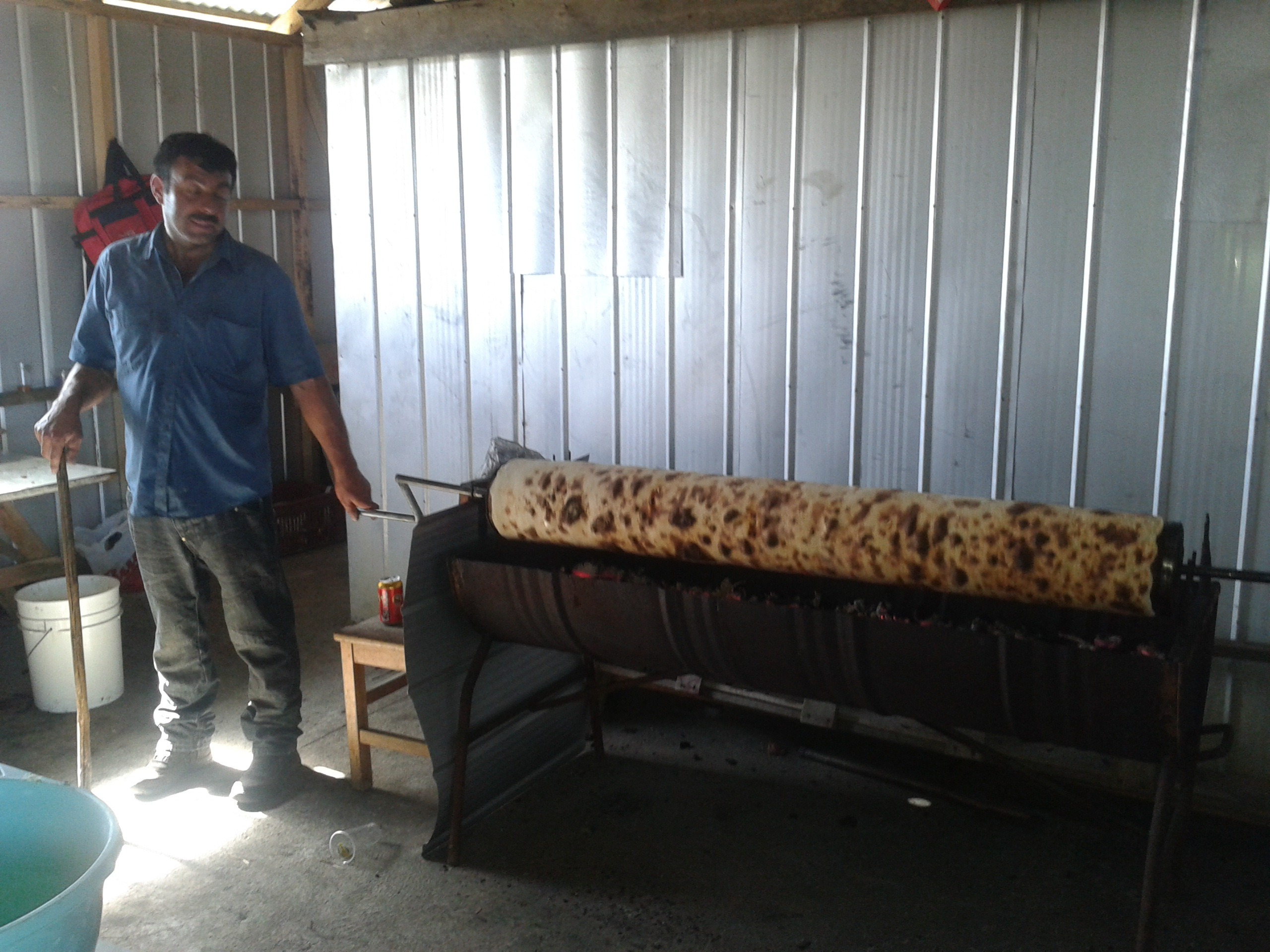
A man roasts chochoca in the town of Pidpid outside Castro, Chiloé

== Consumption ==
Chochoca is not prepared frequently for family meals, but instead for special occasions or as part of food festivals. It is also made by vendors selling typical dishes of Chiloé and among the Huilliche people of the Osorno and Ranco provinces, where it is known as trutruyeko. Outside of those places, its consumption is rare, although it can be found at traditional celebrations in Patagonia and Llanquihue provinces due to migration there from Chiloé.

The dish is not to be confused with the Peruvian chuchoca, a ground corn product that is used to make a soup sometimes known as sopa de chochoca.
