= Alan Contreras =

Alan L. Contreras
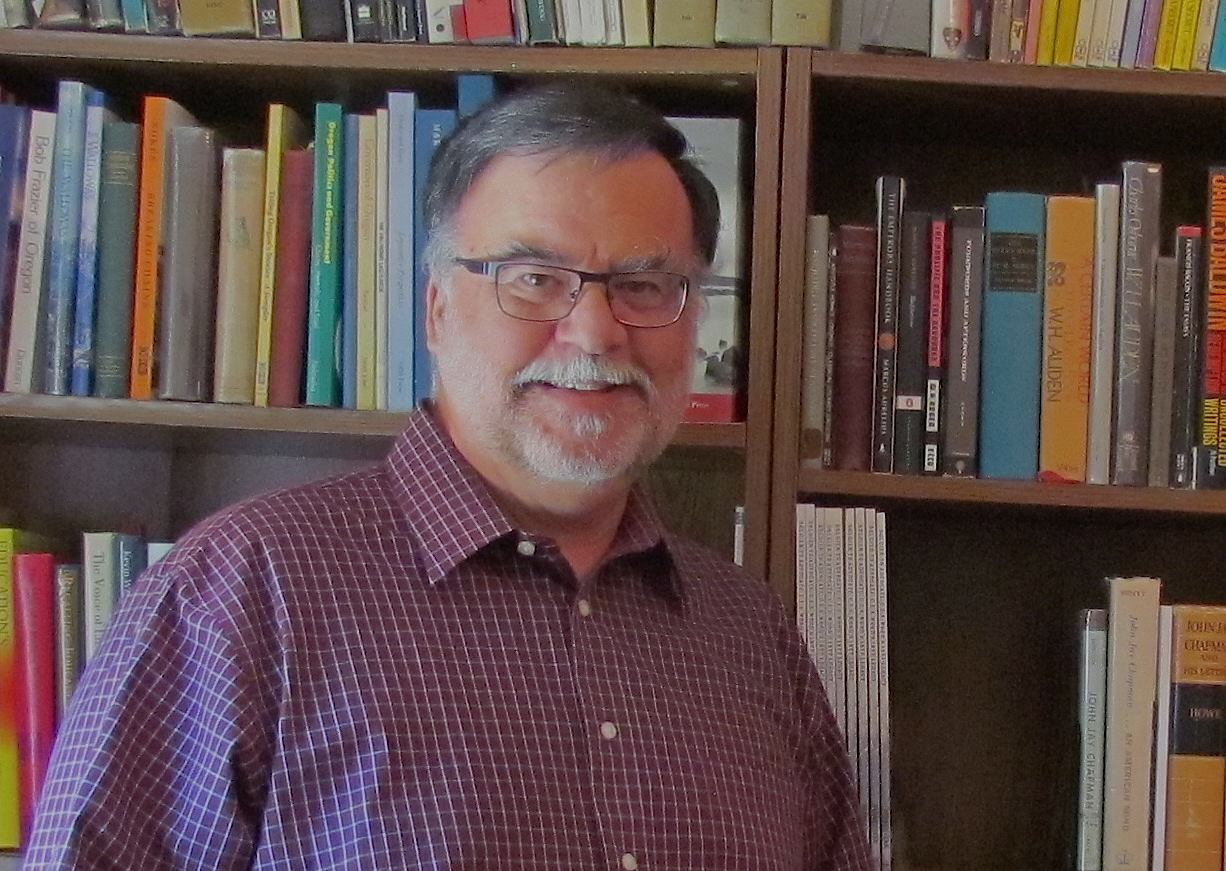
- Born: March 11, 1956 (age 70); Tillamook County, Oregon, U.S.
- Education: University of Oregon (B.S.); University of Oregon School of Law (Juris Doctor)
- Occupations: Writer, education consultant
- Writing career
- Period: c. 1978-present
- Genres: Poetry, nature writing

Alan Lee Contreras (born Mar 11, 1956) is an American writer, poet, birdwatcher, and education consultant. He is best known for his contributions to Oregon ornithology and his work in higher education. He lives in Eugene, Oregon, and works part-time for the State Authorization Reciprocity Agreement (SARA), the Oregon Higher Education Coordinating Commission, and Oregon State University Press.

== Personal ==
Contreras is a fourth-generation Oregonian born in Tillamook County.

== Career ==
Contreras began birding at the age of 11 and started a bird newsletter, The Meadowlark, a year later.

He was one of the founders of Oregon Field Ornithologists (now the Oregon Birding Association) in 1978. In 1982, he received a Bachelor of Science in political science from the University of Oregon. He finished his Juris Doctor from the University of Oregon School of Law in 1985.

He was head of the Oregon Office of Degree Authorization from 1999 until March 2011. He also spent three years working for the Missouri Coordinating Board for Higher Education, four years at the University of Oregon and six years with the Oregon Community College Association.

Throughout this time, Contreras authored several bird books and books of poetry. His work has appeared in The Gay & Lesbian Review Worldwide, the American Birding Association's North American Birds, The Chronicle of Higher Education, and Change: The Magazine of Higher Learning.

Contreras was a mentor to renowned birder Noah Strycker when Strycker was a teenager.

== Books ==
Contreras has had five books published by Oregon State University Press, including Birds of Oregon, which he co-edited, and the more personal Afield: Forty Years Birding the American West.

In 2013, through his own press, Oregon Review Books, he published a collection of correspondence with poet Reginald Shepherd, Song After All: The Letters of Reginald Shepherd and Alan Contreras as a fundraiser for the University of Oregon Creative Writing department.

In 2014, he released a book on C.E.S. Wood, Pursuit of Happiness: An Introduction to the Libertarian Ethos of Charles Erskine Scott Wood.

In 2018, he published a collection of essays, The Captured Flame, with one detailing his friendship with author Ursula K. Le Guin.

== Published works ==
- Northwest Birds in Winter (1997)
- Birds of Oregon: A General Reference (2003) (co-edited with David B. Marshall and Matthew G. Hunter)
- Birds of Lane County, Oregon (2006)
- Afield: Forty Years Birding the American West (2009)
- Handbook of Oregon Birds: A Field Companion to Birds of Oregon (2009) (with Hendrik G. Herlyn)
- The Mind on Edge: An Introduction to John Jay Chapman's Philosophy on Higher Education (2013)
- Song After All: Letters of Reginald Shepherd and Alan Contreras (2013)
- College and State: Resources and Philosophies (2013)
- Firewand: New and selected poems (2013)
- Concerto in Q: Essays, Reviews and Travels 1982–2013 (2013)
- Pursuit of Happiness: An Introduction to the Libertarian Ethos of Charles Erskine Scott Wood (2014)
- Notes for a High School Graduate (2015)
- State Authorization of Colleges and Universities: A Handbook for Institutions and Agencies (2017) (editor)
- On Excellence: And Other Notes On The Human Endeavor (2017)
- In the Time of the Queen: New Poems (2018)
- The Captured Flame: Notes on Books, Music and the Creative Force (2018)
- "Opinion: Dropping ‘Audubon’ from Portland chapter’s name would be a mistake". Oregonlive.com. (2023)
