= Sebastián Contreras (footballer, born 1988) =

Chilean footballer (born 1988)

Personal information
- Full name: Sebastián Andrés Contreras Jofré
- Date of birth: 1 January 1988 (age 38)
- Place of birth: Calama, Chile
- Height: 1.80 m (5 ft 11 in)
- Position: Goalkeeper

Youth career
- Cobreloa

Senior career*
Years	Team	Apps	(Gls)
2007–2016	Cobreloa	34	(0)
2010	→ Rangers (loan)	7	(0)
2016–2019	Ñublense	85	(0)
2020–2021	Deportes Concepción	21	(0)
Total		147	(0)
- * Club domestic league appearances and goals

Sebastián Andrés Contreras Jofré (born 1 January 1988) is a Chilean former footballer who played as a goalkeeper.

== Career ==
A product of the Cobreloa youth system, Contreras played for them until the first half of 2016, with a stint with Rangers de Talca in 2010.

In July 2016, he announced his retirement after ending his contract with Cobreloa. However, he signed with Ñublense in August of the same year.

For the 2020 season, he signed with Deportes Concepción in the Chilean Segunda División, his last club.
