= Curanto =

Chilote method of cooking food

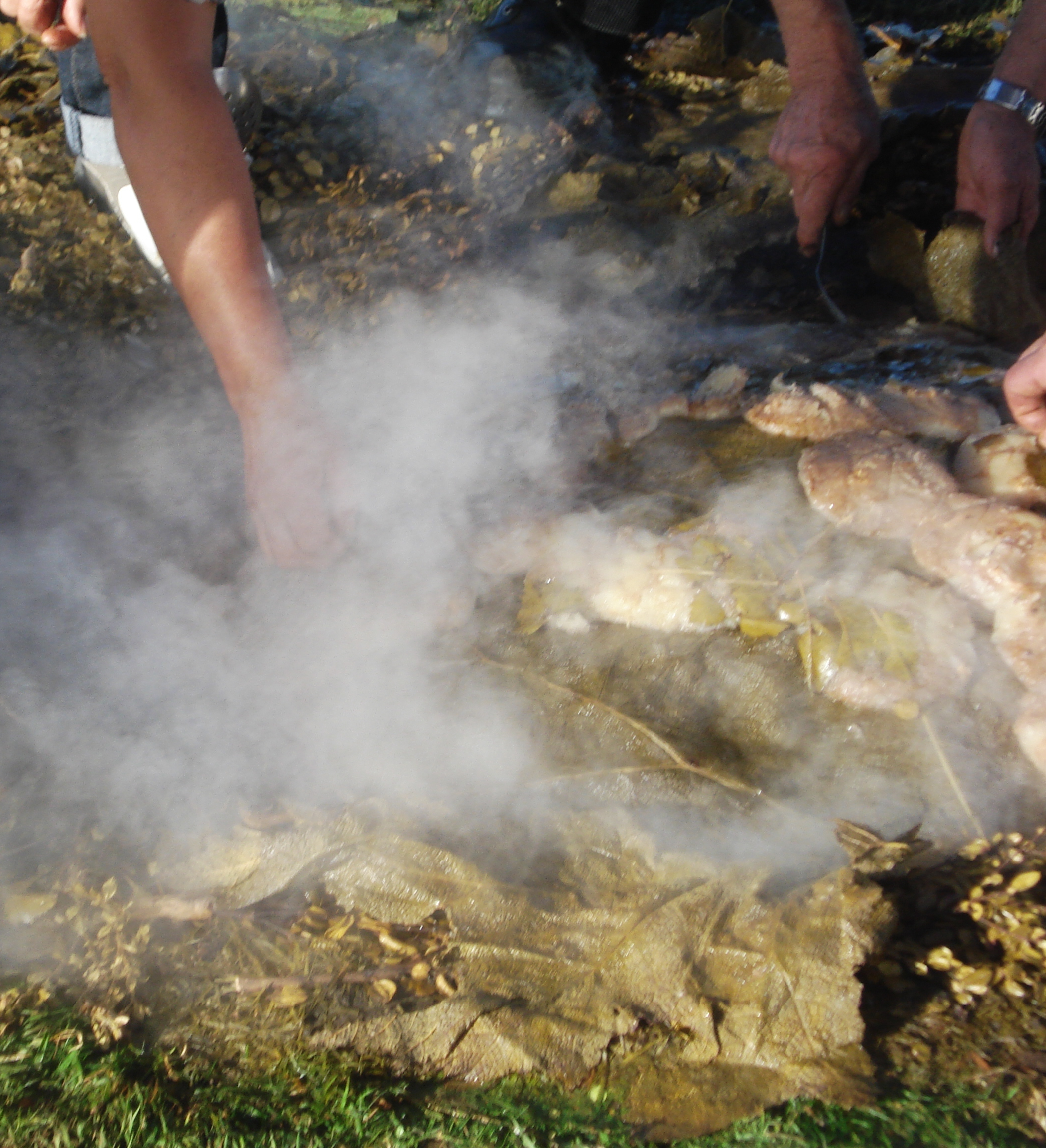
- Uncovering the curanto in Calen, commune of Dalcahue, Chiloé, Chile
- Place of origin: Chile
- Region or state: Chiloé
- Serving temperature: Hot
- Main ingredients: Potatoes, shellfish, meat
- Variations: Multiple

Curanto (from Mapudungun: kurantu 'stony') is a traditional Chilote method of cooking food using heated rocks buried in an earth oven that is covered with pangue leaves and turf. The fundamental components are seafood, potatoes, along with other traditional preparations from Chiloé Archipelago such as milcao and chapalele, to which are added meats, sausages and sometimes crustaceans.

It is part of the Chilean cuisine, and it is one of the most recognized dishes of traditional Chilote cuisine whose oldest archaeological remains date to more than eleven thousand years before present on the Greater Island; there are also finds of lesser data in areas of the coastal edge of the Reloncaví Sound, the inland sea of Chiloé and the northern Patagonian channels. In addition, thanks to the migratory flow of the late 19th century and early 20th century, it spread throughout the south of that country.

Although its preparation has been documented in various ethnographic accounts since the 16th century, traditionally in the cuisine of the Chiloé archipelago it is prepared outdoors and is called "curanto en hoyo", since it is made in a pit in the ground, about half a meter deep; the bottom is covered with stones, which are heated in a campfire. When they are red hot, the firebrands are removed and the ingredients begin to be placed.

== Preparation ==
The ingredients consist of shellfish, meat, potatoes, milcao (a kind of potato pancake), chapaleles (a kind of potato dumpling), and vegetables. Curanto sometimes also includes specific types of fish. The varieties of shellfish vary but almejas (clams), cholgas (ribbed mussels) and picorocos (giant barnacles) are essential. The quantities are not fixed; the idea is that there should be a little of everything. Each layer of ingredients is covered with nalca (Chilean rhubarb) leaves, or in their absence, with fig leaves or white cabbage leaves. All this is covered with wet sacks, and then with dirt and grass chunks, creating the effect of a giant pressure cooker in which the food cooks for approximately one hour.

Curanto can also be prepared in a large stew pot that is heated over a bonfire or grill or in a pressure cooker. This stewed curanto is called "curanto en olla" or "pulmay" in the central region of Chile.

== History ==
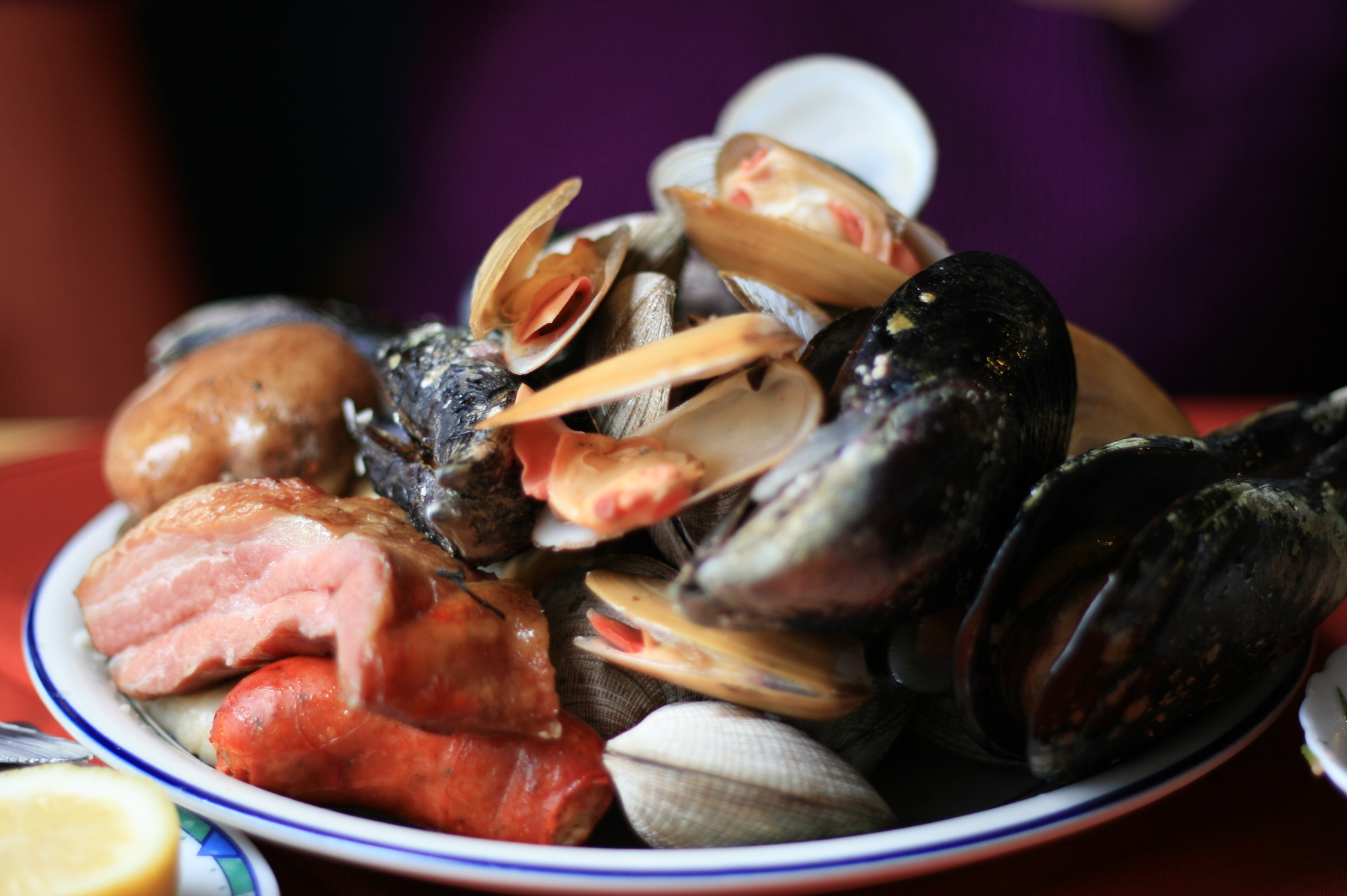
Curanto Chilote

It is believed that this form of preparing foods was native to the "chono" countryside and that, with the arrival of the southern peoples and the Spanish conquistadors, new ingredients were added until it came to be the curanto that is known today.

== See also ==
- Clam bake (New England)
- Earth oven
- Hāngī (New Zealand)
- Kalua (Hawaii)
- Pachamanca (Perú)
