= Edgar Contreras (surgeon) =

Dominican doctor and politician (b. 1961)

- Born: Edgar Isidro Contreras Rosario; May 15, 1961 (age 65); Santo Domingo, Dominican Republic
- Education: Universidad Iberoamericana (UNIBE)
- Occupations: Plastic Surgeon, Businessman
- Years active: 26
- Known for: Accomplished Plastic Surgeon
- Relatives: Yudith Minaya (wife, divorced in 1999); Merfry Then (wife, 2000-present)
- Medical career
- Profession: Plastic Surgeon
- Field: Reconstructive and Cosmetic Surgery

Edgar Contreras (born May 15, 1961) is a Dominican plastic surgeon, doctor, and aspiring politician.

== Education ==
Contreras began his studies in medicine, at the Universidad Pedro Henríquez Ureña, and completed his career at the Universidad Iberoamericana (UNIBE) in Santo Domingo, where he obtained his title of Doctor in Medicine. He later pursued his professional studies in Rio de Janeiro, Brazil to later practice in the Dominican Republic.

== Career ==
In 2005, Contreras founded the Clínica de Cirugía Estética Plástica Contreras, which offered plastic surgery services for 9 years. In 2013 and 2014, his clinic was recognized by the Latin American Quality Institute as an Enterprise of Excellence. Aside of its medical work, the clinic has been involved in social endeavors in the community.

Contreras currently serves as president of the Administration Council of Be Center. He is also an active member of the Brazilian Society of Plastic Surgery and the Dominican Academy of Plastic Surgery.

== Charity work ==
In 2012, Contreras started the Pirámides Populares Foundation, with the purpose of promoting the development of empoverished communities. He also started the project Liderazgo Juvenil to promote the empowerment and development of youth in the Dominican Republic. Contreras is also a founding partner of Eco-Club, which promotes ecotourism and preservation of the environment.

Contreras started a foundation under the name of Dr. Edgar Contreras Foundation. According to the doctor, its main goal is the "community development". In September 2015, the foundation signed an agreement with the National Federation for Small and Medium Enterprises to further the inclusion of communities in the national economy. Aside of this, the foundation has been involved in other charity works.

== Politics ==
Contreras entered politics with the presidency of Hipólito Mejía in 2000. During this time, he served as an Assistant to Roberto Rodríguez, Director of the National Institute of Water Supply and Sewerage (INAPA). Since then, he remained as an active member of the Dominican Revolutionary Party. In 2014, Contreras joined the Modern Revolutionary Party.

In 2015, Contreras announced he would run for Senator for the Santo Domingo Province.

== Controversies ==
In 1998, a Puerto Rican woman died from post-surgery complications 15 days after Contreras performed a lipoinjection in her legs. The next year, Dominican journalist Isabel Vargas also died after having a liposuction at Contreras clinic. Both cases prompted an investigation of the clinic's practice, as well as a criminal case against Contreras. In 2002, a judge revoked the suspension on Contreras, allowing him to practice medicine during his judicial process. In 2004, former consul María de los Angeles Morel died from complications of a liposuction performed by Contreras. In 2006, he was acquitted of the death of Morel, while in 2010 he was also acquitted of the death of Vargas.

The latest case occurred in 2015 when a Dominican woman also died from complications after undergoing a lipsculpture surgery performed by Contreras. During the investigation, many patients came forward to defend his practice. In 2015, a group of 20 patients of Contreras organized a press conference to voice their support for him, after his clinic was closed by the Public Health Ministry. Although the family of the woman claimed they would sue the clinic, an autopsy performed by the National Institute of Forensic Pathology revealed that there was no malpractice. As a result, the Minister of Public Health reinstated Contreras to perform surgery again.
