= Luis Contreras =

Luis Contreras may refer to:

- Luis Contreras (actor), American actor
- Luis Contreras (boxer), Venezuelan boxer
- Luis Contreras (footballer), Salvadoran footballer
- Luis Contreras (jockey), Mexican jockey
- Luis Contreras (baseball), Venezuelan baseball player
