= Albert Contreras =

American artist and painter (1933 - 2017)

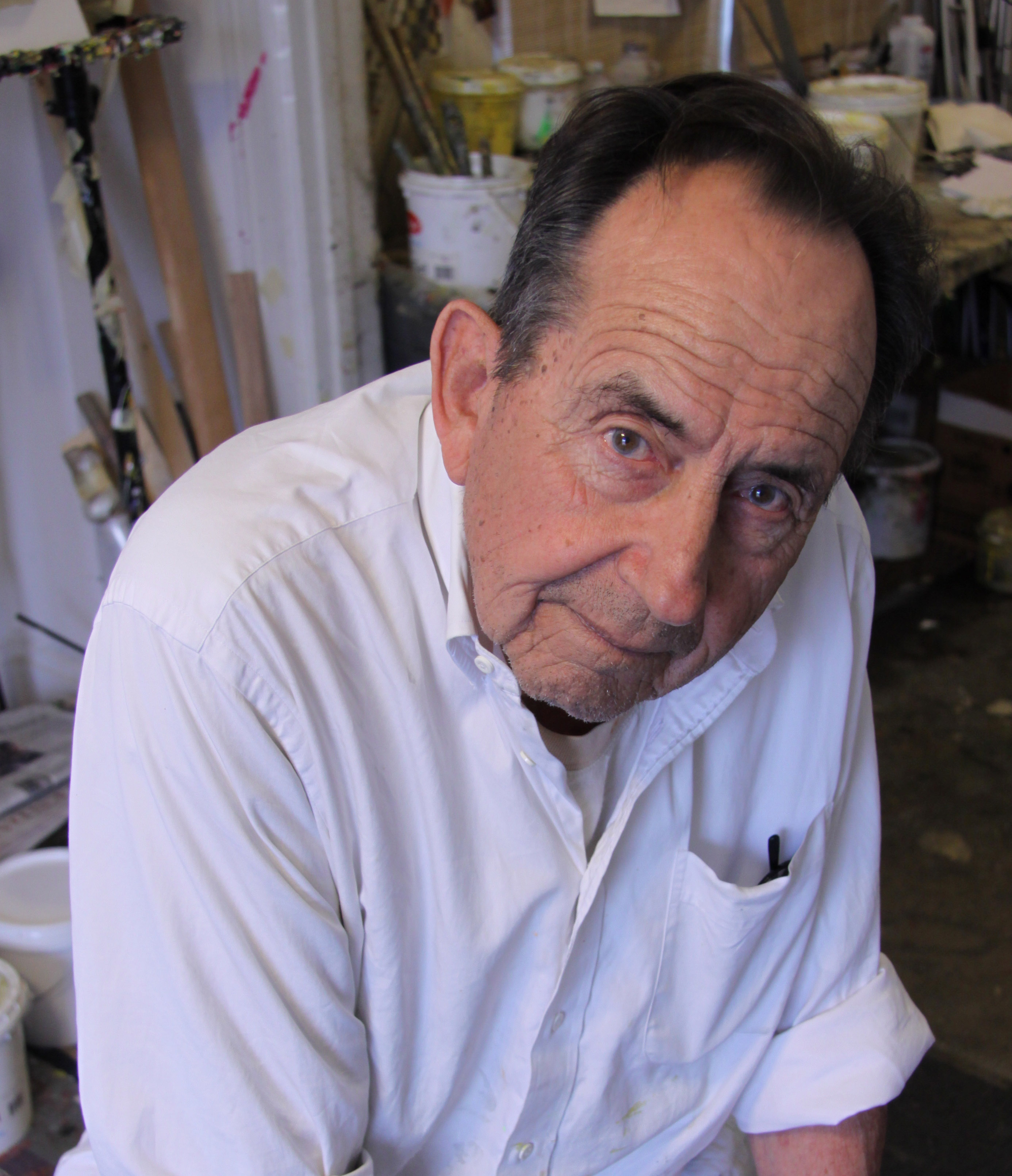

Albert Contreras (1933 – June 17, 2017) was an artist and painter based in Santa Monica, California known for gestural and geometric abstraction. Contreras painted from around 1960 to 1972, and then stopped painting for 25 years. He resumed painting in 1997. Contreras has donated many of his works to museums and university galleries.

== Gallery ==
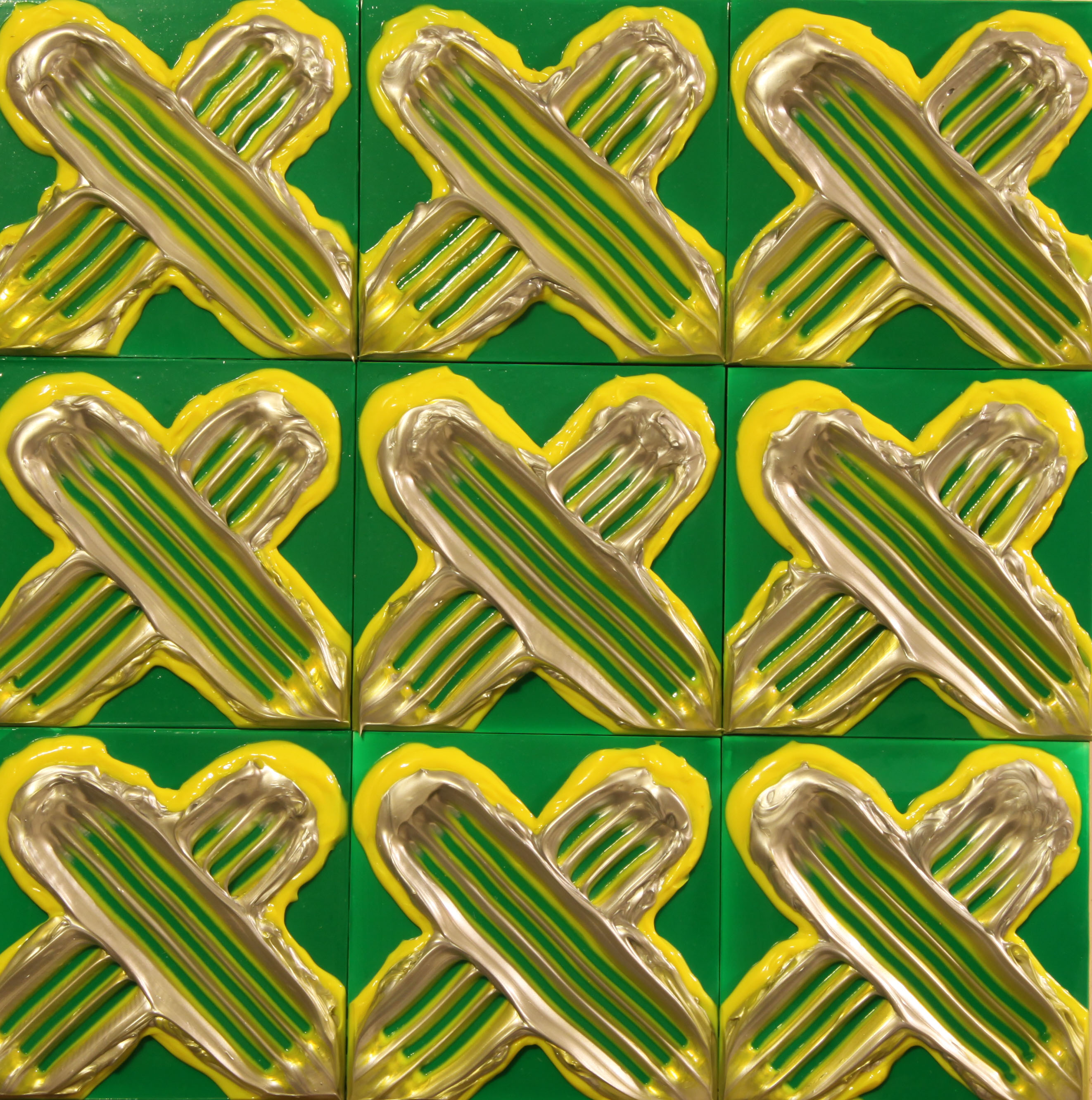
