= Carlos Contreras Zambrano =

Chilean footballer (born 1995)

Carlos Contreras
Personal information
- Full name: Carlos Alfredo Contreras Zambrano
- Date of birth: 22 January 1995 (age 31)
- Place of birth: Santiago, Chile
- Height: 1.73 m (5 ft 8 in)
- Position: Midfielder

Youth career
- Colo-Colo

Senior career*
Years	Team	Apps	(Gls)
2014–2015	Colo-Colo B	20	(0)
2015–2017	Colo-Colo	3	(0)
2016–2017	→ Barnechea (loan)	29	(1)
2017	Deportes Valdivia	9	(0)
2018–2021	Rodelindo Román	8	(0)
Total		69	(1)
- * Club domestic league appearances and goals

Carlos Alfredo Contreras Zambrano (born 22 January 1995) is a Chilean former footballer who played as a midfielder.

== Club career ==
He professionally debuted on 1 March 2015 in a 1–0 away win over Ñublense in Chillán for the 2015 Torneo Clausura.

After three years – from 2018 to 2020 – at amateur leagues, along with Rodelindo Román he got promotion to the Chilean Segunda División for the 2021 season.

In November 2021, he announced his retirement as a professional footballer.

== Personal life ==
He is nicknamed Colocho like the Argentine Fabricio Coloccini and Manuel Iturra.

== Honours ==
Barnechea

- Segunda División: 2016-17

Rodelindo Román

- Tercera B: 2019
