= Patricia Mejía Contreras =

Mexican sculptor (1958–2007)

- Born: Patricia Mejía Contreras; July 7, 1958; Uruapan, Michoacán
- Died: Mexico City
- Education: Escuela Nacional de Pintura, Escultura y Grabado "La Esmeralda"
- Website: https://www.facebook.com/Patricia-Mejia-Contreras-EPD-167361973315883/timeline/

Patricia Mejía Contreras (July 7, 1958 – April 20, 2007) was a Mexican sculptor and graphic artist whose work was recognized with membership in the Salón de la Plástica Mexicana.

== Life ==
Mejía was born in Uruapan, Michoacán and had her first experiences with art at a regional school. Later, she enrolled in Escuela Nacional de Pintura, Escultura y Grabado "La Esmeralda" in 1977, then at the Taller de Fundición Artística of the Instituto Nacional de Bellas Artes y Literatura (INBA), where she studied from 1982-1983.

She died in Mexico City at the age of 48.

== Career ==
Mejía began her career by moving to Mexico City to study and collaborating as an illustrator with the cultural supplement of the newspaper El Nacional as well as in the illustration department of the newspaper El Universal. She also worked in art restoration with the Secretaría de Hacienda y Crédito Público and the Centro de Conservación de Obras Artísticas of INBA. In particular she worked with the collections from the Museo Nacional de la Estampa, the Taller de Gráfica Popular, the Academia de Artes and works done by Manual Manilla and José Guadalupe Posada. She also worked on the documentation and restoration of works by Pablo O'Higgins.

She participated in numerous collective exhibitions during her career, but had only six individual ones, the last being Atrás la obscuridad sigo el vuelo del Ave Fénix at the Salón de la Plástica Mexicana, into which she was inducted in 2000.

In 2001, she founded the sculpting workshop called La Nave de los Desarraigados, dedicated to the creation of sculptures in bronze, aluminum, marble, basalt, sandstone and wood.

== Artistry ==
The study of the human figure is a constant in her work showing the influence of artists such as Michelangelo, Raphael and Caravaggio. However, her work recomposes their classic styles and is more Expressionistic. Faces often show primitive emotions and hand positions also indicate attitude and situations, generally a moment captured in a scene.
