= José Contreras (luthier) =

Spanish violin maker (c. 1710–c. 1780)

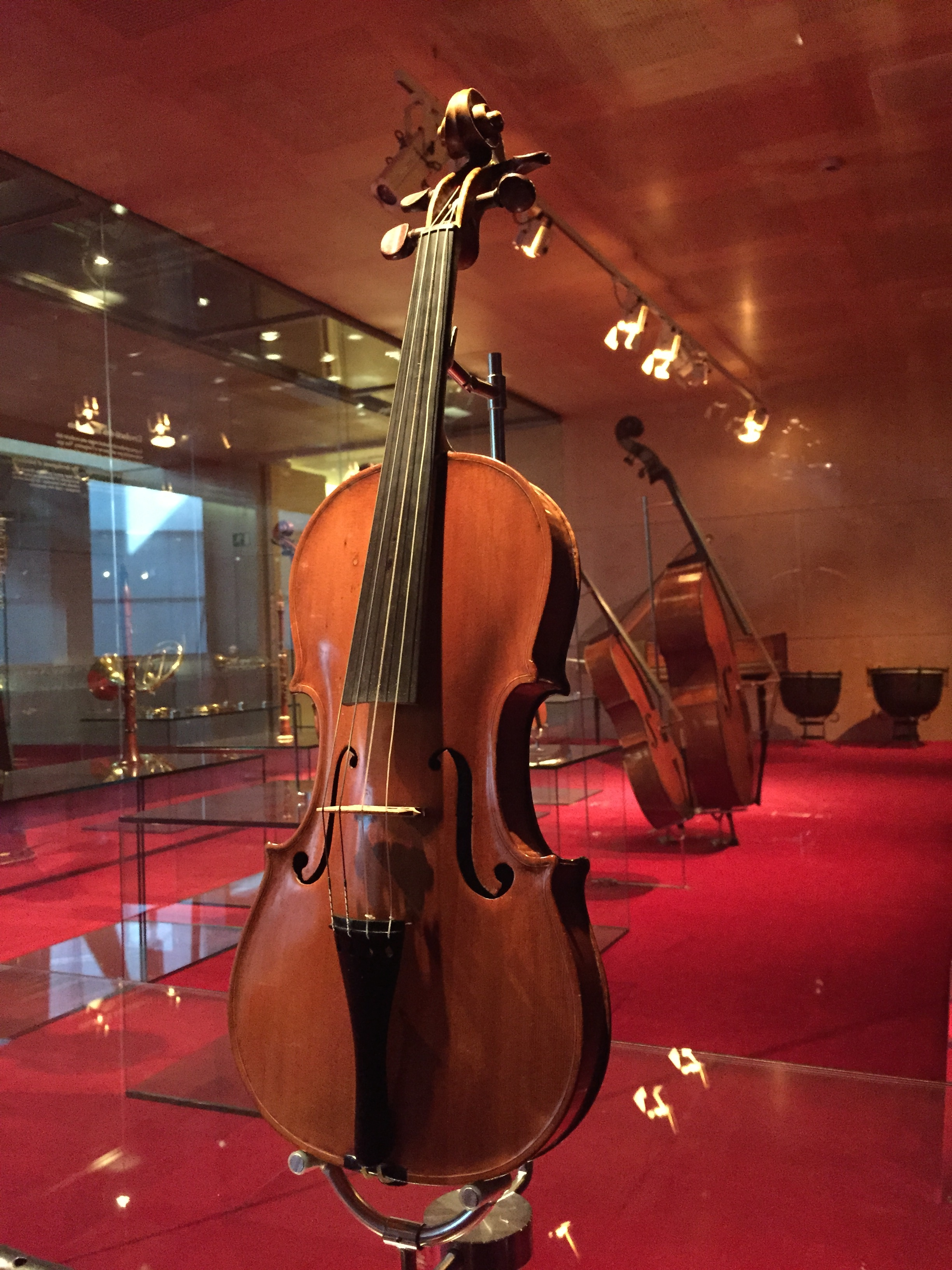
Violin of José Contreras, 1741, Museu de la Música de Barcelona

José Contreras I (c. 1710 – c. 1780), nicknamed "el Granadino", was a Spanish violin maker.

Contreras was born around 1710, in Granada, Spain. He probably lived in Italy during his early life, his style being Italian. He worked in Madrid from about 1745, as violin maker and repairer to the Spanish Court. This brought him into contact with some of the best violins of his day, including examples by Stradivarius and Guarnerius. He is famous for the copies of these instruments which he made, using fine materials and exceptional skill.

Only a few of his instruments have survived today, and are highly prized. Famous players of Contreras violins have included Shlomo Mintz, Nigel Kennedy and members of the Endellion Quartet. He died in approximately 1780, leaving a son, José-Meliton Contreras, who continued the family business in Madrid. His violins contain the label 'Matriti per Granadensem Josephum Contreras, anno ....'

== José-Meliton Contreras ==
Contreras was born in Madrid, on March 10, 1741, and died on October 15, 1791, also in Madrid. He had his workshop in El Olmo Street, near that of his father and teacher, and like him, he had the opportunity to be a repairer of the instruments of the musicians of the Royal Capital. Very few instruments of his are known. They are also copies of Stradivari, according to the canons of the best works of this Cremonese school, with little pronounced vaults, embossed edges and excellent workmanship, especially in the scroll. The varnish in red on a yellow background matches those of Italian masters.

The instruments contain the label 'Matriti per Filium Granadensis Jph ^{m} de Contreras Anno 17... '

== Photos ==
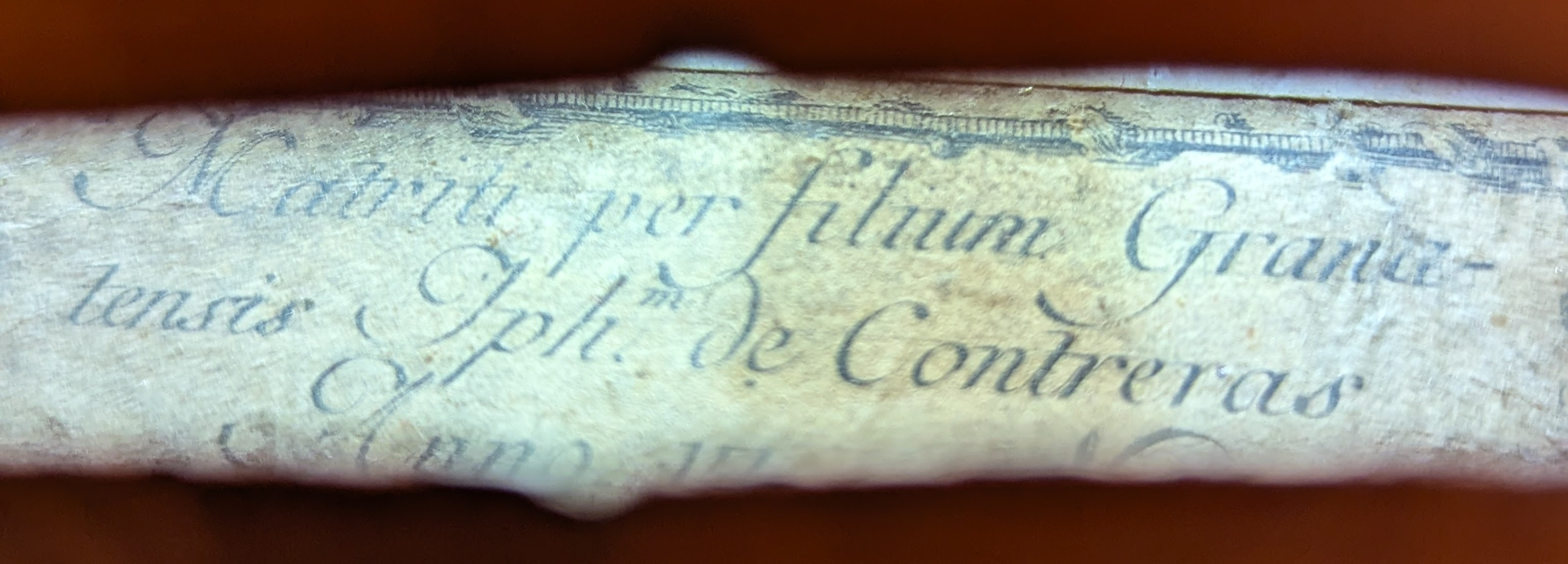
The label from a violin dated 1777, made by José-Meliton Contreras

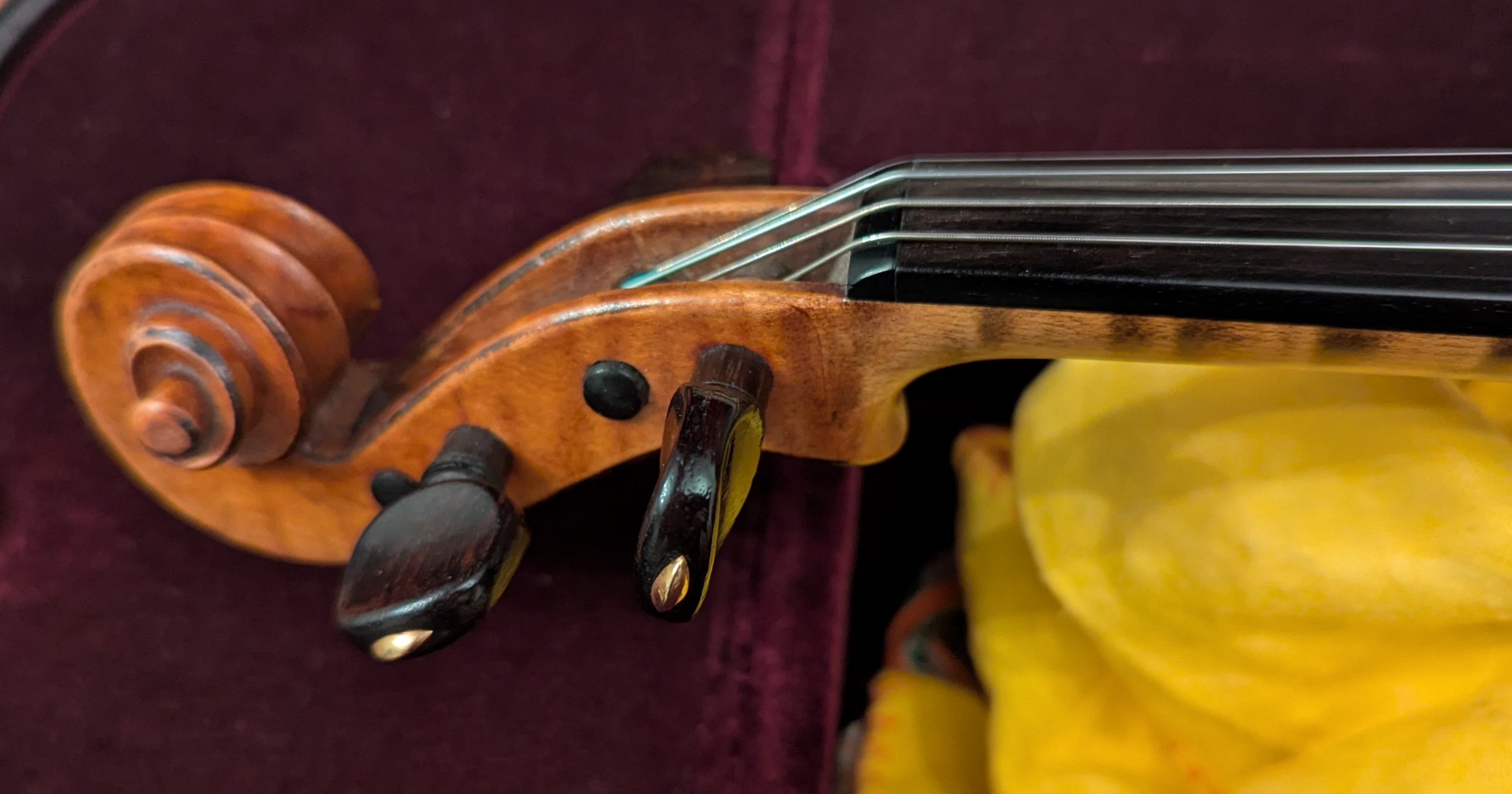
Scroll of José-Meliton Contreras violin, 1777
