= Change: The Magazine of Higher Learning =

The Magazine of Higher Learning
- Cover of the November 2024 issue
- Language: English

Publication details
- History: 1970–present

Standard abbreviations
- ISO 4: Change

Indexing
- ISSN: 0009-1383
- OCLC no.: 300189995

Links
- Journal homepage

Change: The Magazine of Higher Learning (ISSN 0009-1383, OCLC 300189995) is an academic magazine devoted to the study of higher education, described by The Chronicle of Higher Education as a "stalwart of higher education".

== History ==
The magazine was founded in 1970, sponsored by the American Association for Higher Education, published in Washington, D.C. by Heldref Publications.

By 1979, the magazine was taken over by Heldref Publications.

After the Association ceased operating in 2005, the magazine was sponsored by the Carnegie Foundation for the Advancement of Teaching until 2016, when its sponsorship was switched to the Council for Higher Education Accreditation.
