= Andrés Contreras =

Andrés Contreras Méndez (died November 30, 2014) was a Chilean agronomist known for his studies of the native potatoes of Chiloé. Contreras pioneered preservation efforts of the many varieties of Chiloé potatoes as he began in the 1960s to travel Chiloé Archipelago in search of small gardens where local elderly women had grown potatoes over many generations. In 1990 he led a potato-hunting expedition to Guaitecas Archipelago; the southern limit of Pre-Hispanic agriculture. San Juan de la Costa was another location where he collected potatoes. Contreras improved local varieties intended to be used in small scale agriculture in Chiloé and San Juan de la Costa. Contreras established the gene bank of Chilean potatoes at the Austral University of Chile in Valdivia. Contreras died on November 30, 2014, being 71 years old.
