= Chapalele =

Chilean dumpling made from boiled potatoes and wheat flour

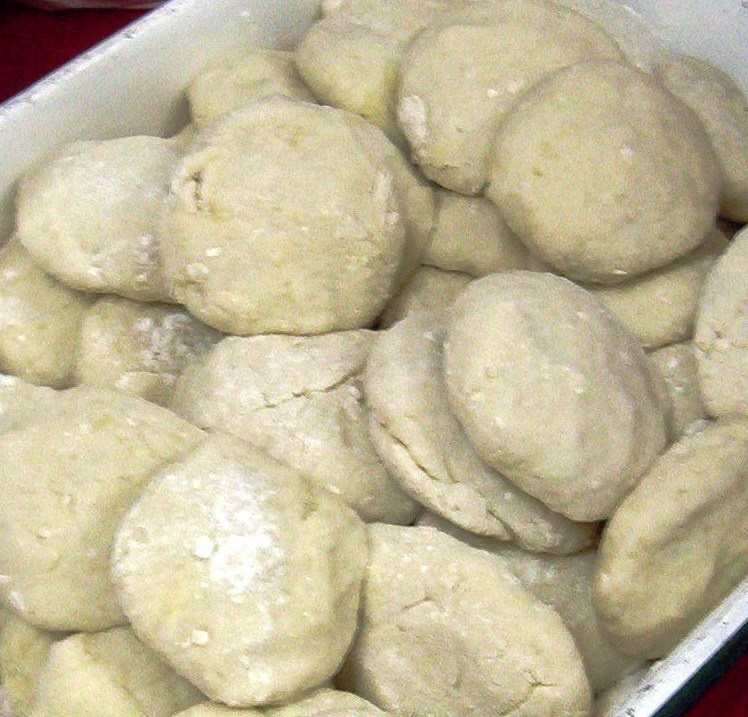
- Uncooked chapaleles
- Type: Dumpling
- Place of origin: Chile
- Main ingredients: Potatoes, wheat flour

A chapalele is a Chilean dumpling made from boiled potatoes and wheat flour. They are especially prevalent among the cuisine of Chiloé.
