= Víctor Contreras Ruíz =

Mexican musician (born 1980)

- Born: Víctor Manuel Contreras Ruíz; 29 September 1980 (age 45); Tultepec, State of Mexico, Mexico
- Occupations: Organist, harpsichordist and orchestral conductor

Víctor Manuel Contreras Ruíz (born September 29, 1980) is a Mexican organist, harpsichordist and orchestral conductor.

He studied organ with Éric Lebrun, at the Saint-Maur-des-Fossés Conservatory, where he also studied harpsichord with Élisabeth Joyé and Richard Siegel. Upon his return to Mexico, he studied conducting with Sergio Cárdenas and Fernando Lozano Rodríguez.

He founded the International Organ Festival of Mexico City, as well as the Organ Festival of Santa Prisca, in Taxco, and the Organ Festival of the Guadalupano Sanctuary of Zamora.

Founder of the sponsorship of the National Institute of Fine Arts and Literature.

As of 2020, he is carrying out the project ¨Epístolas Sonoras¨, which consists of three discs of Mexican Baroque music, from the 20th century and contemporary, under the auspices of the National Fund for Culture and the Arts, in the category of Performers with a track record. He made the first world recording in Italy under the auspices of FONCA of the recently discovered ¨Matines tones Notebook of Sor María Clara del Santisimo Sacramento¨ as well as performed live concerts with the same works on Radio UNAM.

He is a professor of the Organ, Harpsichord and is the director and founder of the Baroque orchestra and choir at the National Conservatory of Music (Mexico). He is also an organ teacher at the INBA School of Music.
