= Milcao =

Chilean potato pancake

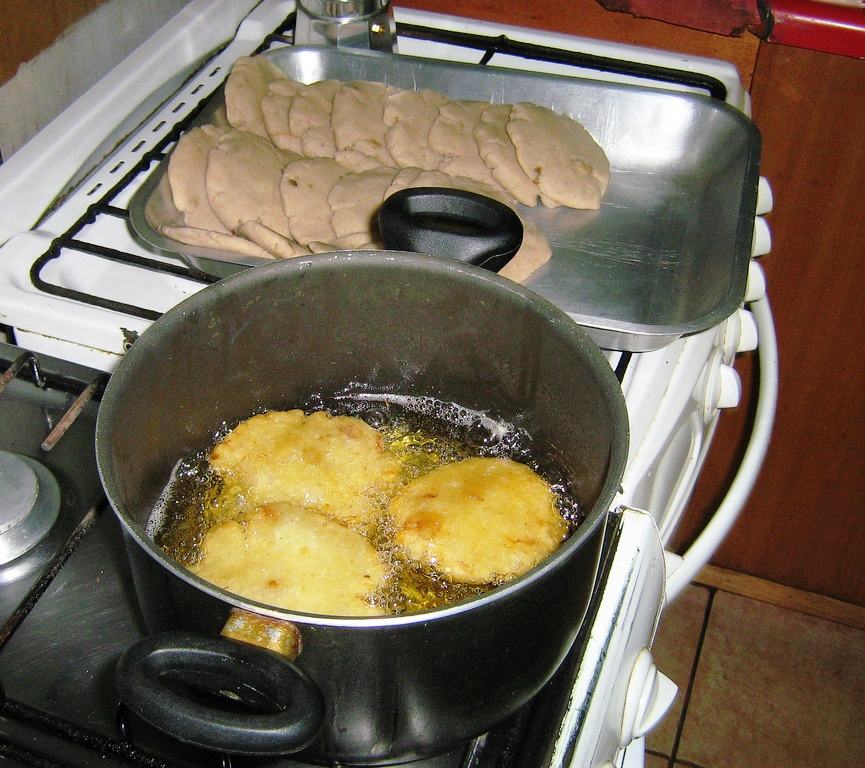
- Milcaos fritos
- Alternative names: Melcao, Milcado
- Course: Main course, side dish
- Place of origin: Chile
- Region or state: Chiloé Archipelago
- Serving temperature: Hot
- Main ingredients: Potatoes of Chiloé, lard, salt and vegetable oil.
- Variations: Baemes

Milcao or melcao (sometimes hypercorrected to milcado) is a traditional potato pancake dish originating from the Chiloé Archipelago in Chile. The dish is prepared with raw grated potatoes and cooked mashed potatoes mixed with other ingredients. It forms an important part of the Chilotes dishes curanto and reitimiento, and is mentioned frequently in folklore as part of Chilotas songs and riddles. The dish spread to the south of Chile and Argentina with the migration of many Chilotas families to Patagonia during the second half of the 19th century and the beginning of the 20th century.

== Preparation ==
The most important ingredient is Chilotan potatoes, several different varieties of which are used to prepare milcao. Half the potatoes are cooked and mashed and the other half are grated, sometimes using the traditional Chilote tool of a volcanic pumice stone.

One of two methods may then be employed. The most common method produces milcaos colados, strained milcaos, sometimes pronounced as the rhyming milcaos colaos with a silent “d”, as is common in Chilean Spanish. Here, the grated potatoes are strained to extract most of the water by folding in a dish cloth or pressing in a sieve or against a hard surface.

Alternatively, the grated potato can be folded directly into the mash, to produce milcaos rallados (“grated milcaos”).

In the straining method, the juice from the strained potatoes is saved and decanted to produce chuño, a kind of potato starch. The chuño can then later be used to make milcao de chuño, milcaos made with a base of potato starch.

The strained or grated potatoes are kneaded into the cooked potatoes and seasoning and lard are added to form a dough. This is then shaped and pressed by hand into flat, round pancakes. The pancakes can be cooked in the oven, fried or (traditionally) baked and eaten with the curanto.

== Variations ==
Most milcaos are savory, with chicharrones (pieces of fried pork meat and fat) commonly added before cooking. However, there are a number of sweet or neutral variations.

- Milcao al horno o frito (oven-baked or fried milcaos): The most common methods of preparing milcaos. They may contain chicharron, which is either mixed in with the dough or stuffed into the pancakes like a pie. They have a reddish-brown crust and a pale center.
- Milcaos de curanto (curanto milcaos): The traditional Chilote method of steaming the pancakes in an upper layer of the curanto, spread with hazel and nalca branches. Cooked in this way, the milcaos gain a dark crust and retain an essence of the leaves in their flavor. This preparation method is less common because of the complexity of preparing a curanto.
- Milcados pelados (peeled milcaos) or Baemes: Milcaos that are boiled and eaten sweetened with honey or sugar.
- Milcaos chuño (potato starch milcaos): Instead of using grated potatoes, dried potato starch from previous preparations is used to make the milcaos. They are fried and have a golden crust and a pale center. If they are boiled they can also be eaten sweetened, like the milcaos pelados.

== Ingredients ==
- Potatoes or Chilote potatoes
- Lard
- Salt
- Vegetable oil for frying
- Chicharrones
