= Víctor Contreras (field hockey) =

Mexican field hockey player (born 1941)

Víctor Contreras (born 27 August 1941) is a Mexican former field hockey player who competed in the 1972 Summer Olympics.
