= Japan Today =

Online newspaper based in Tokyo, Japan

- Type: Online
- Founded: 2000
- Language: English
- Headquarters: Tokyo, Japan
- Website: www.japantoday.com

Japan Today is a website that publishes wire articles, press releases, and photographs, as well as opinion and contract pieces, such as company profiles, in English.
