= Luis Amezcua Contreras =

Mexican money launderer (born 1974)

Luis Ignacio Amezcua Contreras
- Born: Colima, Mexico
- Occupation: Head of the Colima Cartel
- Status: Incarcerated
- Criminal charges: Drug trafficking and smuggling and money laundering

Luis Ignacio Amezcua Contreras (born c. 1974), along with his brothers Adán, Gilberto and Jesús, was a leader of the Colima Cartel, a Mexican methamphetamine and precursor drug smuggling organization.

== Arrest ==
On June 1, 1998, Luis and Jesús Amezcua were arrested in Guadalajara by agents from the Mexican counter-narcotics agency, Fiscalia Especial Para Atencion a los Delitos Contra la Salud (FEADS). The Colima Cartel at the time of the arrests of Luis and Jesús was believed to be "the most prominent methamphetamine trafficking organization operating ... as well as the leading supplier of chemicals to other methamphetamine trafficking organizations" Within 9 days of their arrest, The New York Times reported two of the three charges Luis and Jesús Amezcua Contreras were facing were dropped. Judge Jose Nieves Luna Castro dropped from each, one count of criminal association and money laundering, saying they had been charged under statutes that were not in effect at the time of their alleged crimes, leaving one remaining charge for each of the brothers.

On September 5, 2002, Japan Today published an article in which the head of the attorney general's organized crime unit (UEDO), Joe Luis Santiago Vasconcelos, stated the sisters of the imprisoned Colima Cartel leaders Luis Ignacio, Jesus, Gilberto Ramiro and Adan Amezcua-Contreras had taken over for their brothers. all brothers Freed from jail as of 2 years ago

== Kingpin Act sanction ==
On 1 June 2000, the United States Department of the Treasury sanctioned Amezcua under the Foreign Narcotics Kingpin Designation Act (sometimes referred to simply as the "Kingpin Act"), for his involvement in drug trafficking along with eleven other international criminals. The act prohibited U.S. citizens and companies from doing any kind of business activity with him, and virtually froze all his assets in the U.S.

== See also ==
- Illegal drug trade
- Mexican drug war
- Mexico–United States border
