= Jesús Amezcua Contreras =

Mexican drug trafficker

- Born: Colima, Mexico
- Other name: Chuy
- Occupation: Head of the Colima Cartel
- Status: Incarcerated
- Criminal charges: Drug trafficking and smuggling and money laundering

José de Jesús Amezcua Contreras (born c. 1975, along with his brothers Adán and Luis, was a leader of the Colima Cartel, a Mexican methamphetamine and meth-precursor smuggling organization.

The Colima cartel has become a branch of the Sinaloa Cartel as are the Guadalajara Cartel, and Sonora Cartels.

== Arrest ==
On June 1, 1998, Luis and Jesús Amezcua were arrested in Guadalajara by agents from the Mexican counter-narcotics agency, Fiscalía Especial para Atención a los Delitos contra la Salud (FEADS). The Colima Cartel at the time of the arrests of Luis and Jesús was believed to be "the most prominent methamphetamine trafficking organization operating ... as well as the leading supplier of chemicals to other methamphetamine trafficking organizations" Within 9 days of their arrest, The New York Times reported two of the three charges Luis and Jesús Amezcua Contreras were facing were dropped. Judge José Nieves Luna Castro dropped from each, one count of criminal association and money laundering, saying they had been charged under statutes that were not in effect at the time of their alleged crimes, leaving one remaining charge for each of the brothers.

=== Trial and aftermath ===
In May 2002, a federal court blocked the scheduled extradition of José de Jesús Amezcua to the United States to face drug trafficking charges because the U.S. extradition request did not comply with Mexico's requirement that extradited criminals not face the possibility of capital punishment or a life sentence.

On September 5, 2002, Japan Today published an article in which the head of the attorney general's organized crime unit (UEDO), José Luis Santiago Vasconcelos, stated the sisters of the imprisoned Colima Cartel leaders Luis Ignacio, Jesús and Adán Amezcua Contreras had taken over for their brothers.

== Kingpin Act sanction ==
On June 1, 2000, the United States Department of the Treasury sanctioned Amezcua under the Foreign Narcotics Kingpin Designation Act (sometimes referred to simply as the "Kingpin Act"), for his involvement in drug trafficking along with eleven other international criminals. The act prohibited U.S. citizens and companies from doing any kind of business activity with him, and virtually froze all his assets in the U.S.

== See also ==
- Illegal drug trade
- Mexican drug war
