= Adán Amezcua Contreras =

Drug lord; Leader of the Colima Cartel

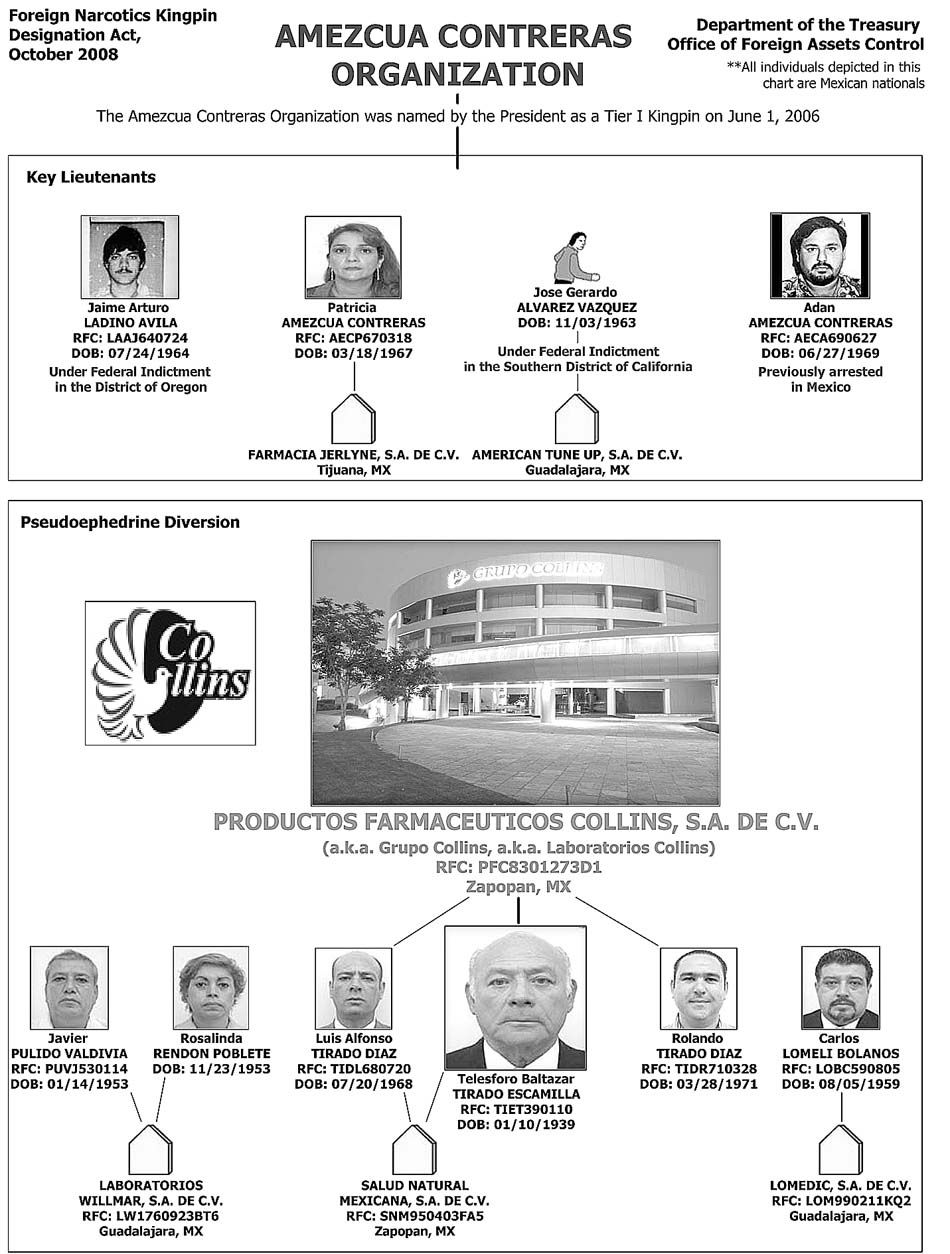
AMEZCUA CONTRERAS ORGANIZATION

Adán Amezcua Contreras (born c. 1969), along with his brothers Jesús and Luis, was a leader of the Colima Cartel, a Mexican methamphetamine and precursor drug smuggling organization.

== Arrest ==
On November 10, 1997, Adán Amezcua was arrested in his hometown of Colima, Col., Mexico, on weapons charges. Two years later in March 1999, Adán Amezcua was arrested on money laundering charges; the charges were however dropped 2 months later and he was released.

== Kingpin Act sanction ==
On October 2, 2008, the United States Department of the Treasury sanctioned Amezcua Contreras under the Foreign Narcotics Kingpin Designation Act (sometimes referred to simply as the "Kingpin Act"), for his involvement in drug trafficking along with nine other international criminals and six entities. The act prohibited U.S. citizens and companies from doing any kind of business activity with him, and virtually froze all his assets in the U.S.

== See also ==
- Illegal drug trade
- Mexican drug war
- Mexico–United States border
