= Culture of Chile =

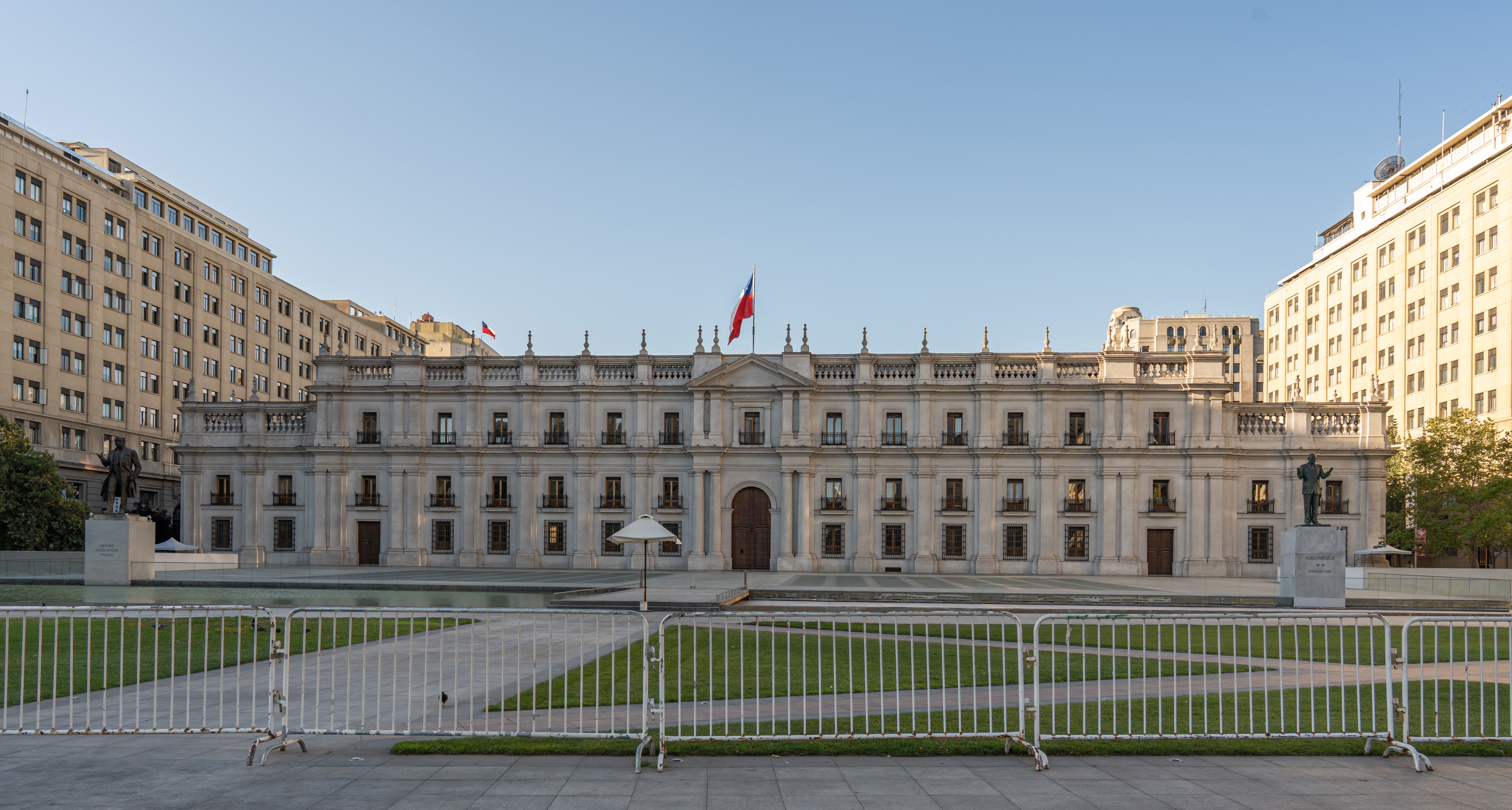
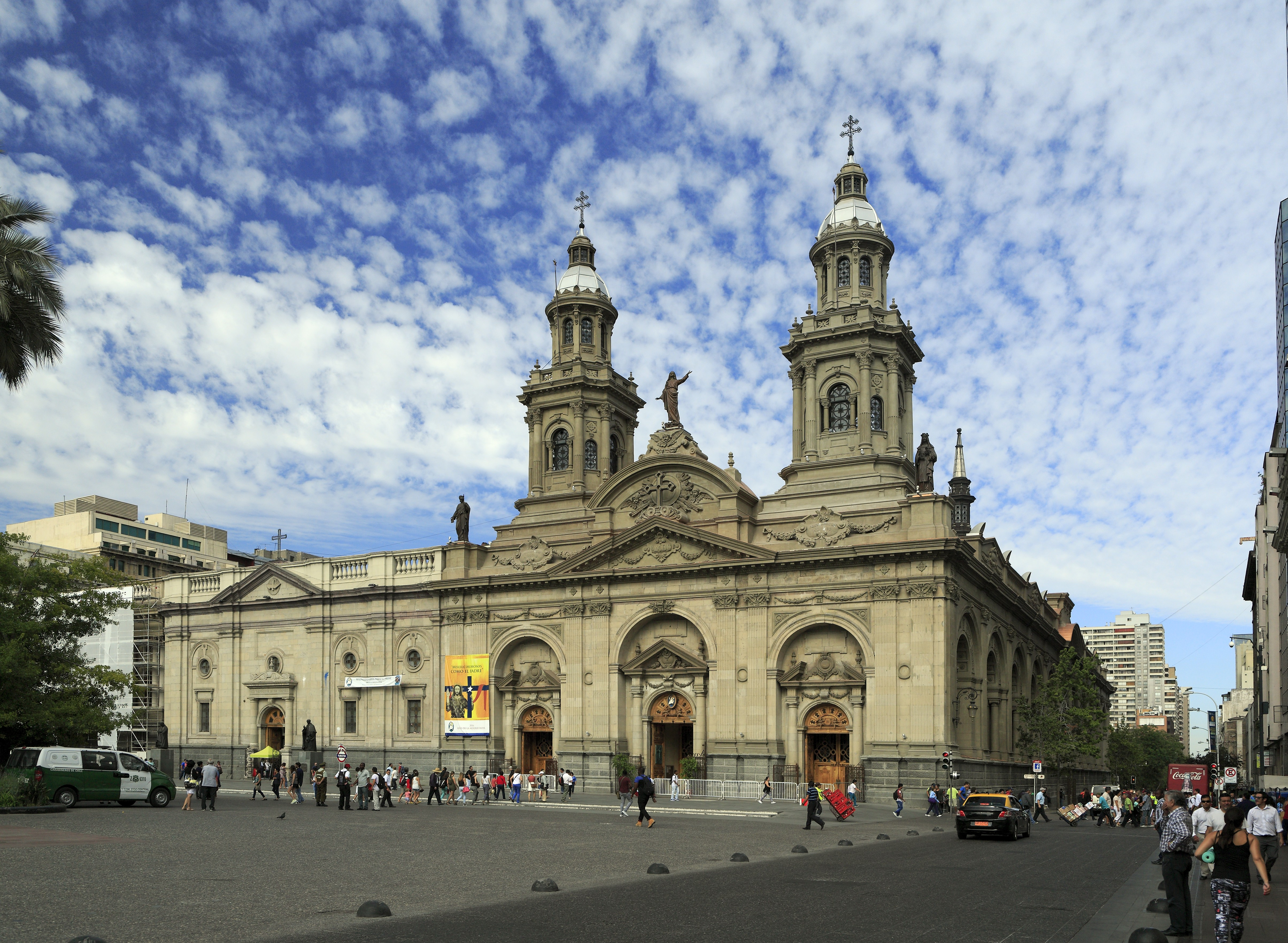
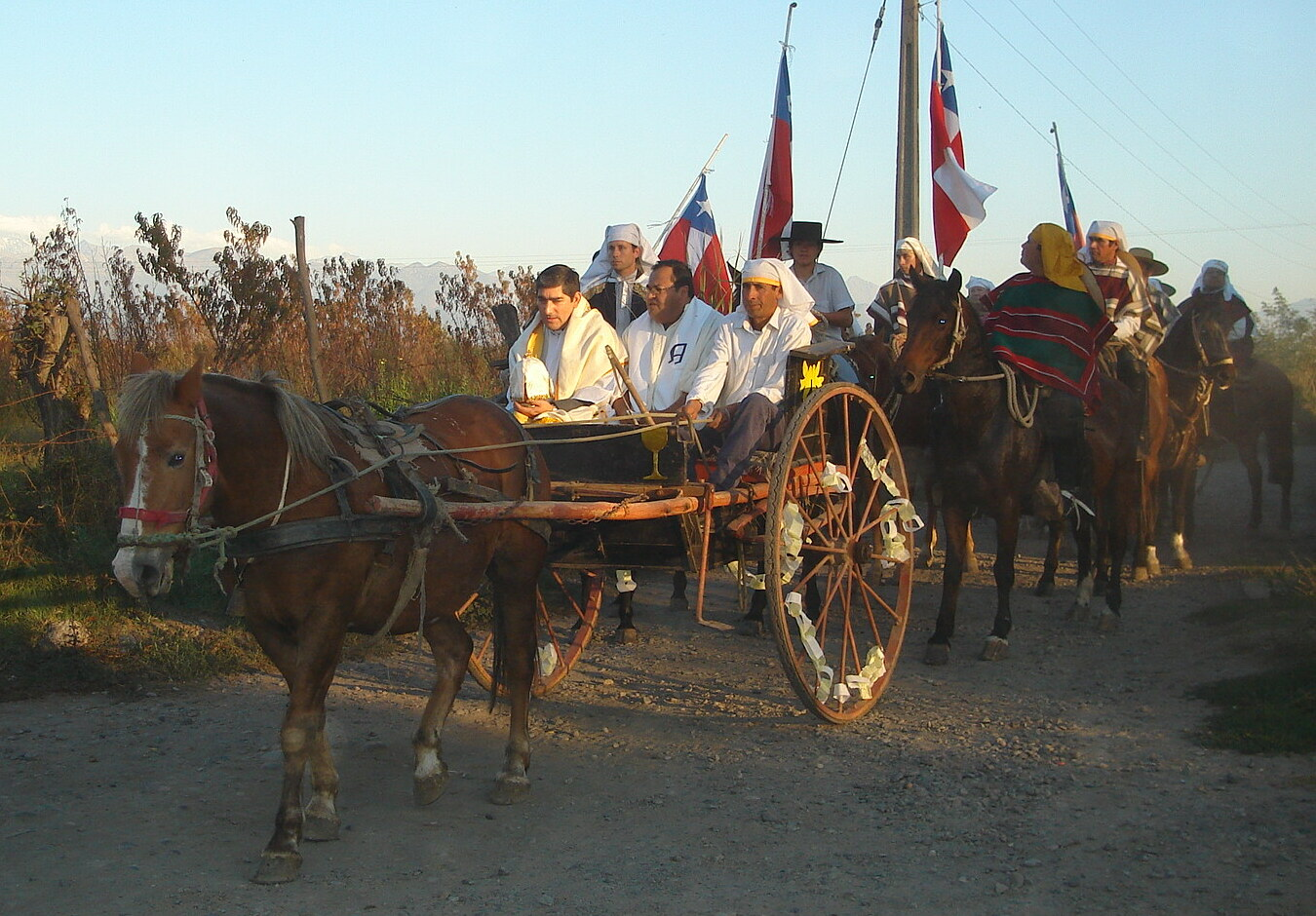
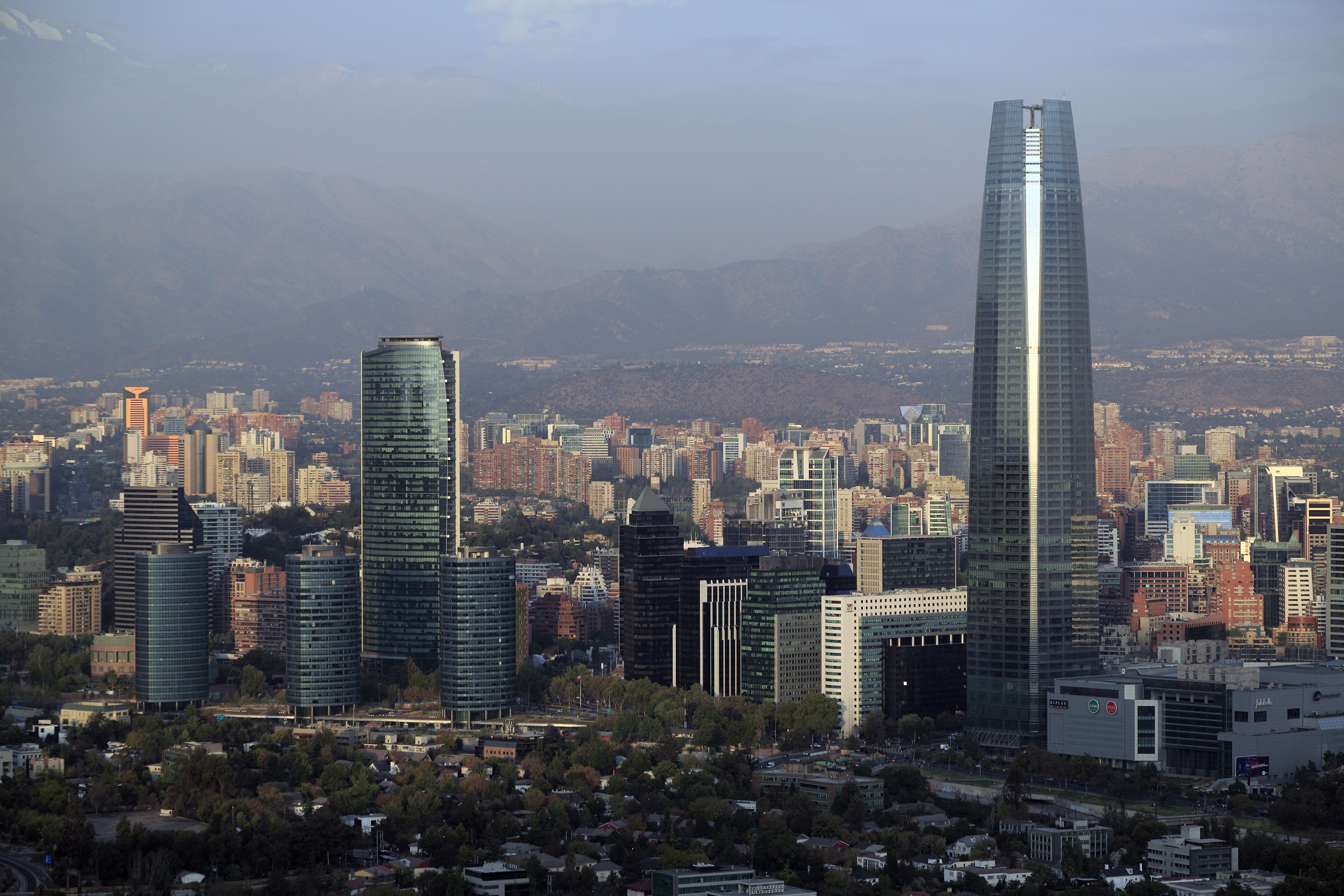
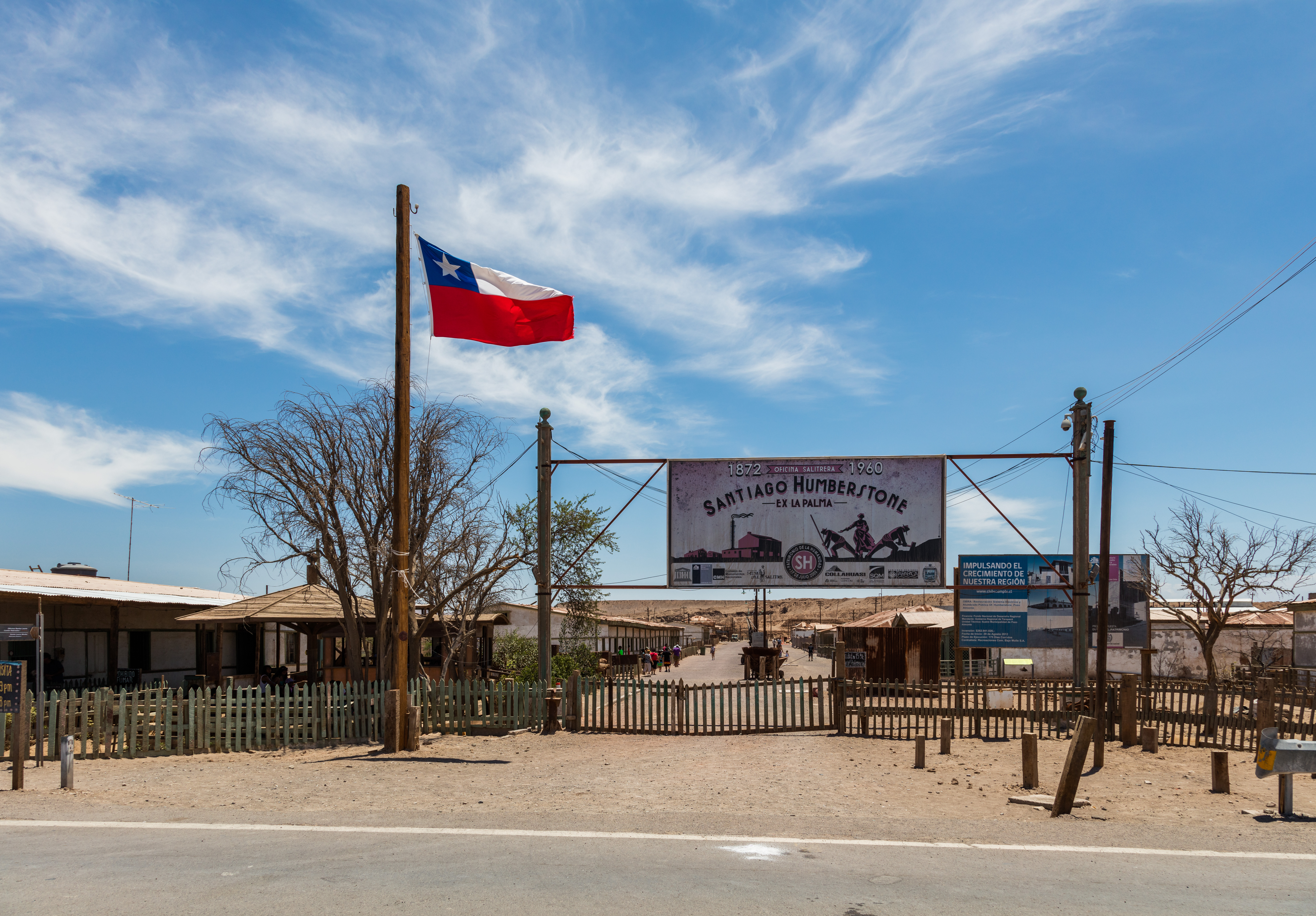
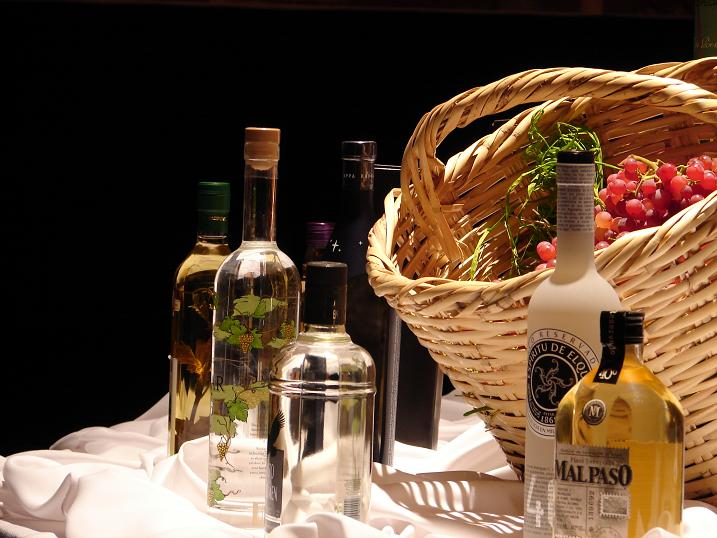
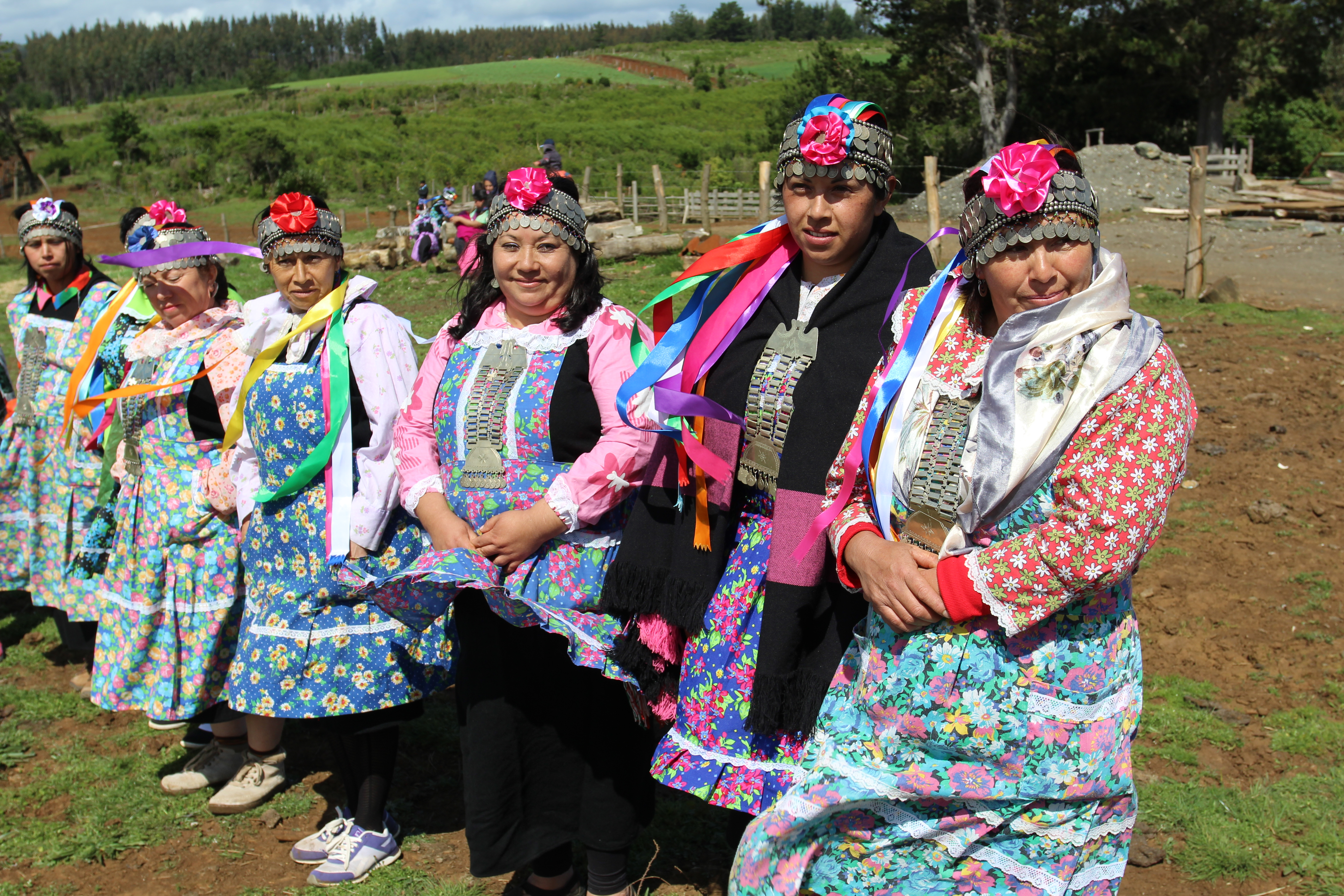
From top, left to right: La Moneda Palace, Santiago Metropolitan Cathedral, Cuasimodo, Sanhattan, Humberstone and Santa Laura Saltpeter Works, Chilean Pisco and Mapuches

The culture of Chile reflects the population and the geographic isolation of the country in relation to the rest of South America. Since colonial times, Chilean culture has been a mix of Spanish colonial elements with elements of indigenous (mostly Mapuche) culture, as well as that of other immigrant cultures, mostly German, British, French, and Italian.

The Huasos of Central Chile and their native or folk music and dance are central to Chilean folk culture. Even though the folk traditions of Central Chile are central to Chilean cultural and national identity, Chile is both geographically and culturally diverse with both the North and the South having their own folk music and dance due to different indigenous peoples and different immigrant groups settling there. Additionally, while some regions of Chile have very strong indigenous heritage, such as Araucanía Region, Easter Island, and Arica y Parinacota Region, some regions lack considerable indigenous communities and a few other regions have noteworthy non-Spanish European immigrant heritage.

== National identity ==
The term Chilenidad describes the Chilean National identity.

Hernán Godoy describes the psychological characteristics of the Chilean, and hence part of the Chilean national identity, with following words: roto, madness, sober, serious, prudent, sense of humor, great fear to the ridicule, servile, cruel, and lack of foresight, among other qualities. Jorge Larraín criticized these older descriptions as "overgeneralized abstractions" impossible to apply to a whole nation.

== Cultural expressions ==
=== Music ===
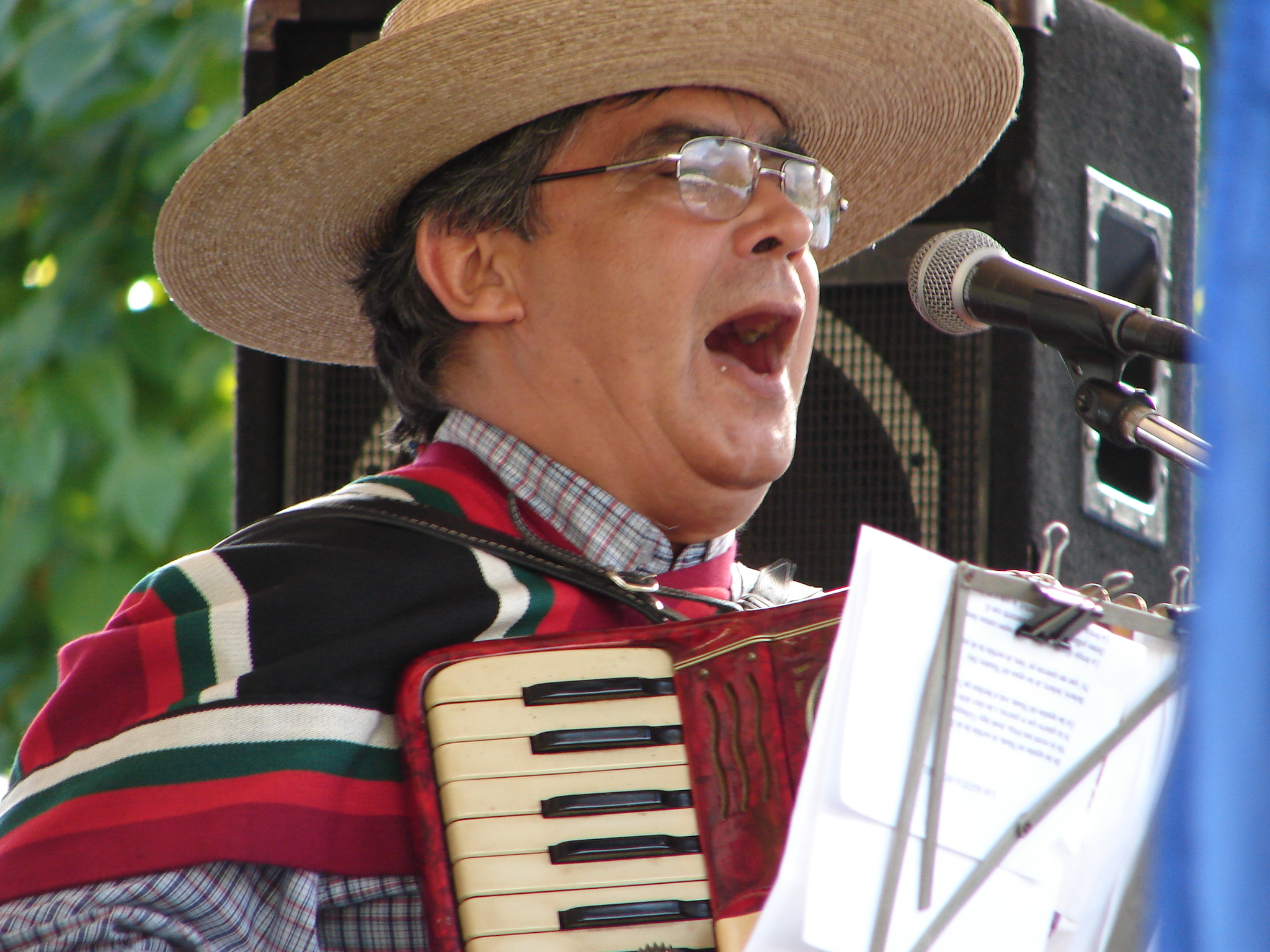
Chilean huaso singing

The national dance of Chile is the cueca (short for Zamacueca) and first appeared in 1824. Another form of traditional Chilean song, though not a dance, is the tonada. Arising imported by the Spanish colonists, it is distinguished from the cueca by an intermediate melodic section and a more prominent melody. The cueca was promoted by the Pinochet regime in the 1970s and 1980s for political reasons to promote Chilean nationalism, cultural pride and conservative patriotic fervor.

In the period from 1930 to 1970, a rebirth in the interest and popularity in folk music in Chile appeared, carried out initially by groups such as Los Cuatro Huasos, who took folk songs from the Chilean country and arranged them vocally and with musical instruments. They gave several recitals in Chile, and in Latin America that contributed with its diffusion. Later appeared other groups such as Los de Ramon, Los Huasos Quincheros, Los Cuatro Cuartos, and others who continued with this diffusion. Also appeared several Chilean folk composers such as Raul de Ramon, Margot Loyola, Luis Aguirre Pinto, Violeta Parra, Víctor Jara, and others that carried out folk investigation and composed folk music that is still sung up to this day. In the mid-1960s native musical forms were revitalized by the Parra family with the Nueva Canción Chilena, which became associated with political activism and reformers like Chilean socialist Salvador Allende and his Popular Unity government. Violeta Parra, Víctor Jara, Los Jaivas, Inti-Illimani, Illapu and Quilapayún perform of this music. During the military rule in the 1970s, all forms of public expression contrary to the junta were repressed, as well as protest songs, which were played and circulated in a clandestine manner. In the late 1980s and after the return of democracy in the 1990s, new musical bands like La Ley, Los Tres and Los Prisioneros, began to appear, and the rise of heavy metal and alternative rock there. Even 1970s Chilean rock bands like the Los Ángeles Negros regained popularity across Latin America. In 2000s, bands like Los Bunkers, Chancho en piedra, Sinergia or 31 Minutos reinvented chilean national rock.

=== Literature ===
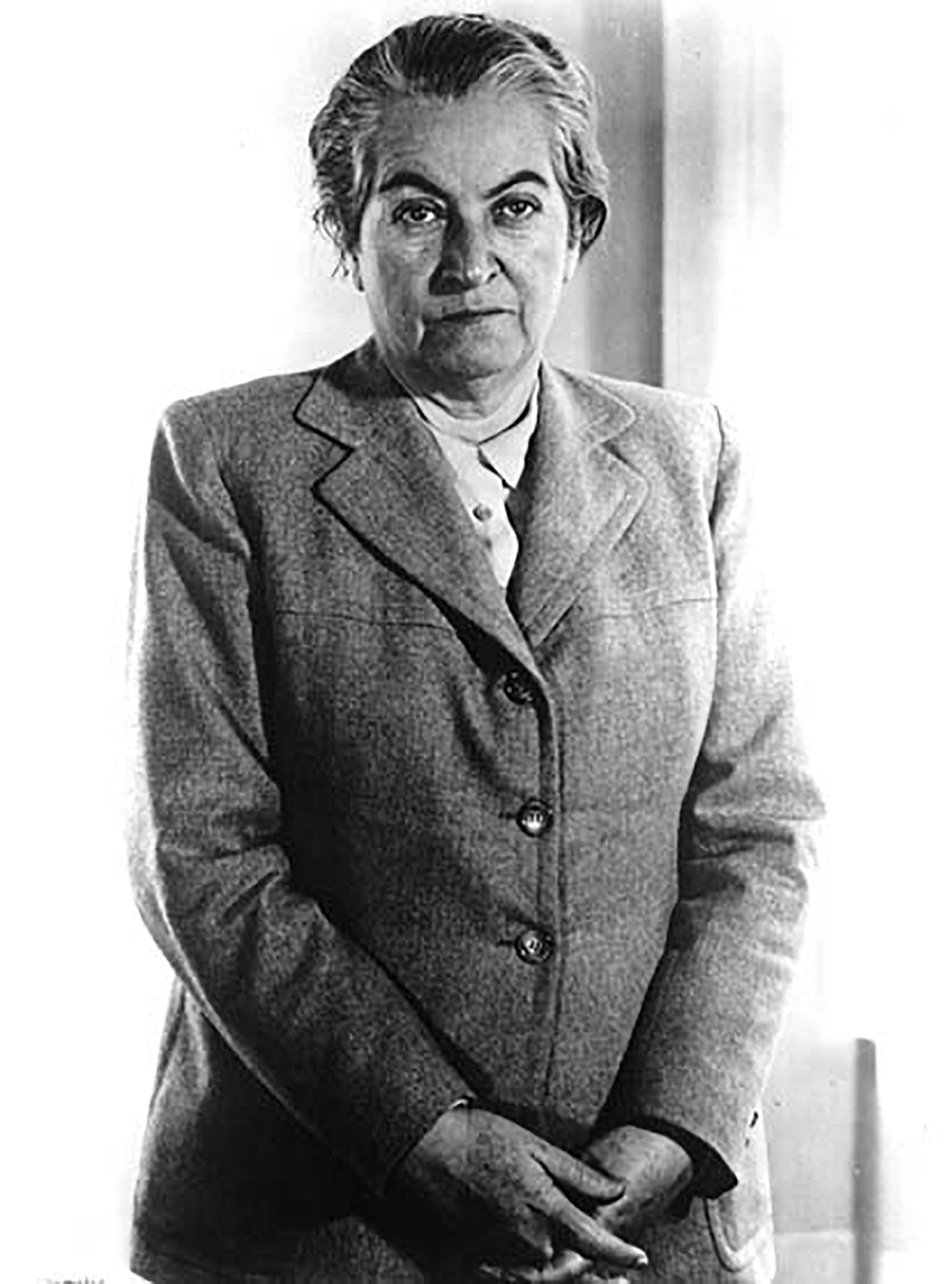
Nobel laureate Gabriela Mistral

Chile's most famous contributions to literature have come from Nobel Prize poets Pablo Neruda and Gabriela Mistral, whose homes and birthplaces are now museums that attract literary pilgrims to Chile. The majority of Neruda's poetry, as individual books or collections of selected poems, as well as his memoirs, are widely available in English, however Mistral's works are harder to find, though collected editions are available.

José Donoso's novel Curfew recalls the latter days of the recent military dictatorship, while Antonio Skármeta's novel Burning Patience (drawing on Neruda's life as a Chilean icon) was the inspiration for the Oscar-winning Italian film, Il Postino (The Postman).

=== Arts ===
The first Condorito comics collection, published in Chile in 1955.

Established in 1849, the Academy of Painting (Santiago, Chile) has helped foster fine painting and inspire young artists. Roberto Matta, a 20th-century painter, is a world known artist who used abstract and surrealist technique in his work. Carlos Sotomayor (1911–1988) is considered one of the main exponents of cubism from South America. Camilo Mori (1896–1973) was the founder of the Group Montparnasse. Claudio Bravo (1936–2011) was a hyper realist who lived and worked in Morocco since 1972.

Sculpture has also been prominent in Chile's culture. In the 19th century, sculptor Rebeca Matte (1875–1929) was the first Chilean woman to embrace the art. She was commissioned to produce a piece by the government of Chile as a gift to the government of Brazil which she called "Icarus and Daedalus" (United in Glory and Peace). In 1930, her husband donated a bronze copy to the Museum of Fine Arts in Santiago which is recognized as a leading masterpiece. Matte also created a battle monument as a tribute to the heroes of Concepción. In the 20th century, Marta Colvin (1907–1995) gained international status by exhibiting her work in cities around the world.

In the field of classical music, the International Society for Chilean Music is a non-profit organization committed to a comprehensive mission of promoting and disseminating the artistic efforts of Chilean musicians, both in Chile and around the world. To this end, they have compiled and disseminated a report published in 2022 (translated the following year), which summarizes their efforts, since its inception, to promote the cause of Chilean music and its exponents, both at Chile and abroad.

=== Cuisine ===
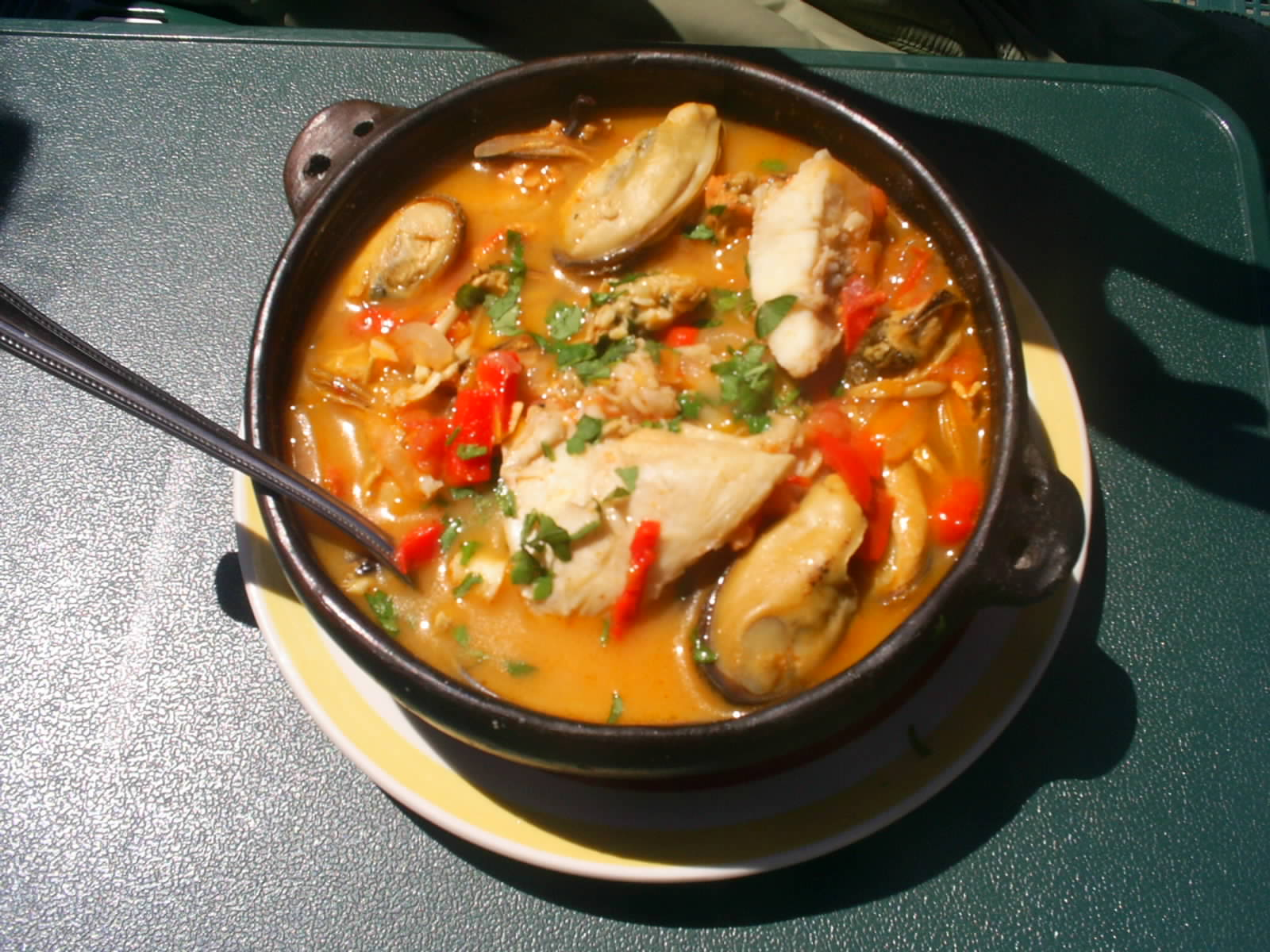
Paila marina

Chilean cuisine uses a variety of products due to Chile's location and long coastline. The cuisine arose from the fusion of traditional indigenous ingredients with Spanish culture and traditions. Further European immigration also brought various styles and traditions in cooking were heavily influenced by the Italians and the Germans. In the 20th century, French cuisine marked an important turning point influencing culinary methods and creating a type of Criollo style that has been implemented now in Chilean cooking. British cooking influences include the onces or tea breaks usually taken in the afternoon among Chileans of all classes and backgrounds. German food influences include traditional cakes and desserts have been adopted in much of Chile. Many Chilean recipes are enhanced and accompanied by wine and Chilean pisco, a type of grape brandy produced in Chile, Pisco is also consumed in neighbouring Peru. Throughout Chile each region spanning from north to south contain a variety of culinary recipes special to each location.

==== Notable Chilean dishes ====
- Arrollado de huaso
- Asado
- Bistec a lo pobre
- Cazuela
- Charquicán
- Chilean salad
- Chilenitos
- Churrasco
- Cola de mono
- Curanto
- Empanada
- Humita
- Manjar Blanco
- Marraqueta
- Milcao
- Mote con huesillo
- Pan de Pascua
- Pastel de choclo
- Pebre
- Porotos granados
- Sopaipilla
- Terremoto

=== Television ===
Television is one of the major mass media of Chile. It was introduced in 1957.

There are 63 broadcast stations throughout the country (plus 121 repeaters) (1997). The broadcast television system used is NTSC.

The primary regulator of television content is the National Television Council (CNTV). The technical aspects are regulated by the Ministry of Transportation and Telecommunications, through the Undersecretariat of Telecommunications (Subtel).

=== Cinema ===
Domestic film production in Chile is still small but dynamic, it has been steadily growing since 1990 and the country now produces about 20 motion pictures annually. The most important filmmakers include Raúl Ruiz (Palomita Blanca), Miguel Littín (El chacal de Nahueltoro), Silvio Caiozzi (Julio comienza en julio), Andrés Wood (Machuca), Pablo Larrain (No) and Sebastián Lelio (A Fantastic Woman). In short animation, Gabriel Osorio (Bear Story). Other entertainment includes radio and television with TVN (Television Nacional de Chile) owned but not paid by the government but funding comes from commercial sponsors by private companies and media productions.

Chile's small and steadily growing film industry has had some hard time filming compared to countries like the United States. A lot of the most successful films before the 1960s were imported form the U.S., Europe, and other Latin American countries. With Chile's film industry really not having as much funding, technology, and education to keep up with some of the bigger filmmakers. Despite the small start, in the recent years Chile's filming industry continues to grow. In the early 2000s things started to take a better turn for the industry as a whole. With the Universidad de Valparaíso, Universidad de Chile and Universidad Católica offer careers in cinematography, which means the expansion and establishment of formal instruction in this field after 2004. Also after 2004, Chile's film industry stated the use of digital cameras, which lowered the cost of production.

Chilean cinema has won an Academy Award on two occasions, Bear Story for Best Animated Short Film and A Fantastic Woman for Best Foreign Language Film.

=== Sports ===
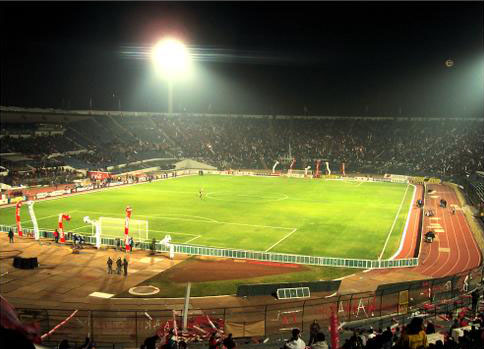
Estadio Nacional de Chile

==== Football (soccer) ====
Football is the most popular sport in Chile, and practiced by Chileans from all economic backgrounds, it is the one sport that appeals to both young and old that is the most accessible. The Federación de Fútbol de Chile is the governing body of "fútbol" in Chile. Practices such as "baby fútbol", which is a street level scrimmage match, is played on areas made of concrete. Located throughout Chile are football stadiums such as Estadio Nacional de Chile located in Santiago, and where the final of the 1962 FIFA World Cup was held. Chile was banned in FIFA participation in the early 1990s due to a faked player injury on the field during a 1989 playoff game and could not appear in the 1990 and 1994 FIFA World Cup events as a result.

==== Skiing ====
Chile practices a host of sporting events, and because of its geographical location that is situated between the Andes Mountains and the Pacific Ocean, skiing and snowboarding are done near those two locations. With more than 4,000 kilometers (2,500 miles) of mountains, Chile is known internationally as one of the world's greatest skiing destinations and the greatest in South America. This is a prevalent sport in Chile among the wealthier classes (considering that this is an expensive sport in this country). This recognition is based on the excellent quality of the slopes, a beautiful landscape, accessibility and proximity to urban centers. Santiago de Chile is interested in hosting the Winter Olympics in the future, destined to be the second site in the southern hemisphere.

The main ski centers are located in Central Chile right in the middle of the Andes, at heights that vary from 2,400 meters (7,900 feet) up to 3,000 meters (9,800 feet) above sea level. These centers are the ones with the biggest skiing surfaces as well as the best supporting infrastructure.

The centers of Southern Chile are located at lower altitudes and most of them are on volcano slopes. The scenery is notable, including scenic forests and panoramic views.

==== Surfing ====
Chile is a great surfing destination, and from the Northern region to the Central region there are many beaches with the right conditions for the sport. It is possible to surf almost all year round except for the middle of the winter (July and August) when weather conditions are non-conducive to surfing. The water temperature fluctuates between 10 and 20 °C (50 and 68 °F).

In northern Chile, the waves are smaller, but very forceful, and between Arica and Iquique, tubes are common. The temperature of the water fluctuates between 15 and 20 °C (59 and 68 °F). Due to the difficult conditions of the Atacama Desert, there are many unexplored, quiet beaches in that area. In the Central Region, the water is a little bit colder, and there are steeper shores and bigger waves.

==== Basketball ====
In addition to football (soccer), basketball is particularly popular in southern Chile, where it as an indoor sport can be played all year round despite Southern Chile's cold and rainy winters. The NCBAOC is the official league. It stands for the National Chile Basketball Association of Chile.

==== Rodeo ====
Rodeo was declared the national sport in 1962. It has since thrived, especially in the more rural areas of the country. Chilean rodeo is different from the rodeo found in North America. In Chilean rodeo, a team (called a collera) consisting of two riders (called Huasos) and two horses rides laps around an arena trying to stop a calf, pinning him against massive cushions. Points are earned for every time the steer is properly driven around the corral, with deductions for faults. Rodeos are conducted in a crescent-shaped corral called a medialuna.

Unlike rodeos in other countries, there is no bull riding or using ropes to tie up cattle. And the idea behind the point system in the game is to get a high number of points. Getting these points takes a high amount of skill. Deductions for faults may included, incorrect maneuvering or the cow escaping. Each pair of Huasos start with 13 points then the deduction system comes into play. Every official rodeo is held over two days, normally Saturdays and Sundays, though occasionally it will be held on Chilean Public holidays.

== See also ==
- Architecture of Chile
- Archaeological sites in Chile
- Arpilleras
- Chamanto
- Chilean American
- Chilean art
- Chilean rock
- History of Chile
- German influence in Chile
- Latin American culture
- Lautaro
- International Society for Chilean Music
- Chile at the Venice Biennale of Architecture
