= Porotos granados =

Traditional Chilean stew

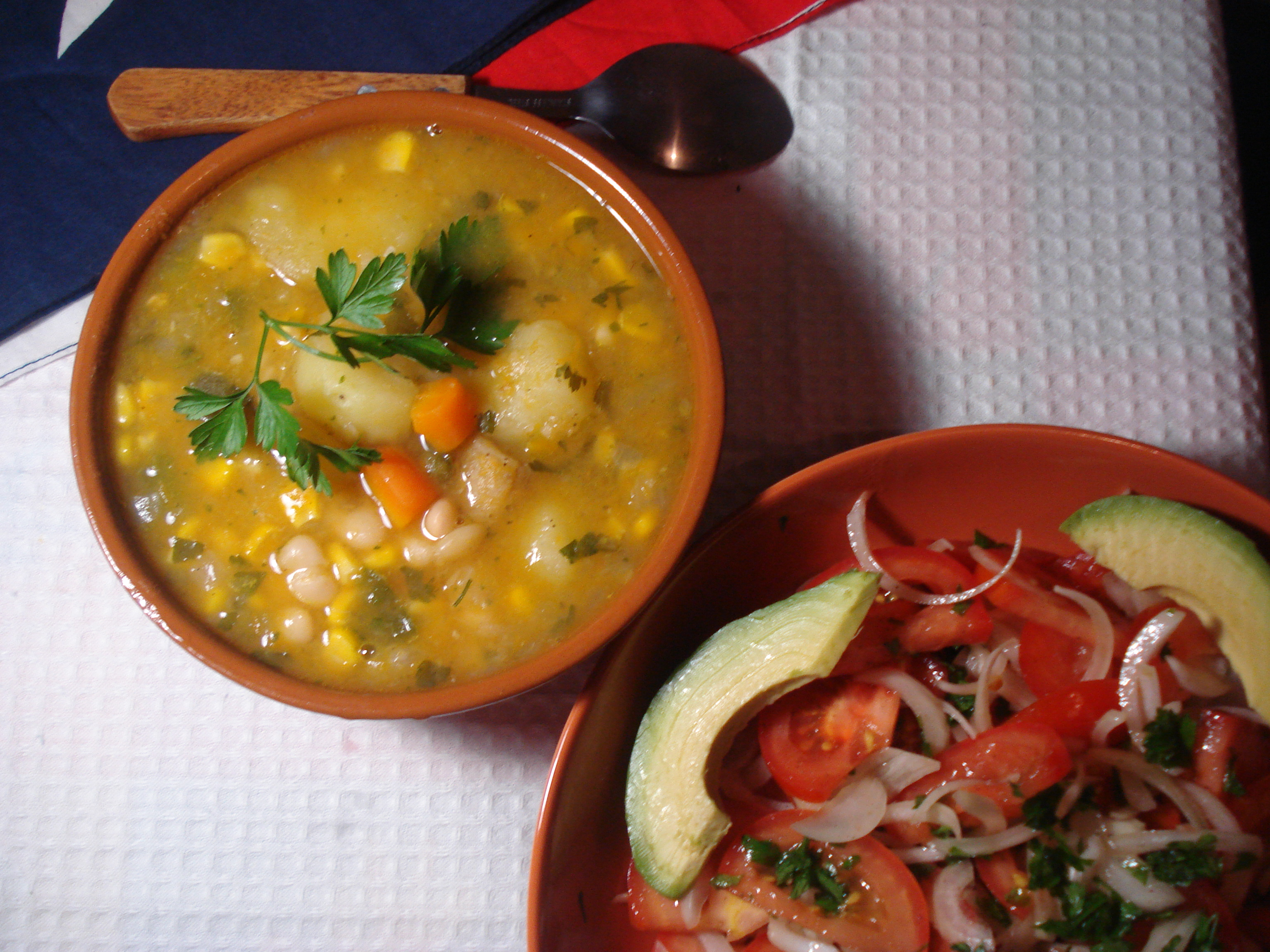
- A variation of porotos granados with potatoes and a Chilean salad.
- Type: Stew
- Course: Main
- Place of origin: Chile
- Region or state: Central and Southern Chile
- Serving temperature: Hot
- Main ingredients: Cranberry bean, sweet corn, squash and pumpkin.

Porotos granados is a traditional Chilean countryside stew made mainly of ripe cranberry beans, maize kernels and squash. Other common ingredients are onions, and herbs such as cumin, basil and oregano. Pumpkin is also used in some recipes. It is considered a summer stew, because that is when the maize and summer squash are harvested in central and southern Chile.

== Origins ==
The Mapuche people, among others, have cultivated beans since pre-Columbian times and most of its ingredients are native to the Americas. The stew receives its name from its main ingredient, ripe harvested Cranberry (cargamanto) beans, originated in Colombia, but also is common among the Aymara people. The word poroto, unique to Chile, southern Peru and Argentina, originally comes from the Quechua word for bean purutu.

== Preparation ==
The most common preparation of porotos granados is the vegetarian version, made by stewing the ingredients in vegetable broth. The original recipe involves fresh picked ripe beans, called pochas in Spain. Porotos granados is sometimes served with Chilean salad, also a summer recipe from the Chilean countryside.

== Variations ==
Although the original version is done with the cargamanto bean that gives the stew its name, similar stews are prepared with tortola beans, coscorron and bayo beans, the three top bean varieties produced in Chile. Replacing the vegetable broth for chicken or beef broth is not uncommon, and in modern times frozen beans and vegetables are used for convenience. There is also a traditional variation called "porotos granados con mazamorra" where the corn is blended to a paste.

== See also ==
- Chilean cuisine
- Culture of Chile
- Porotos con riendas
- Chilean salad
