= Dead Line (Seattle) =

Bar and restaurant in Seattle, Washington, U.S.

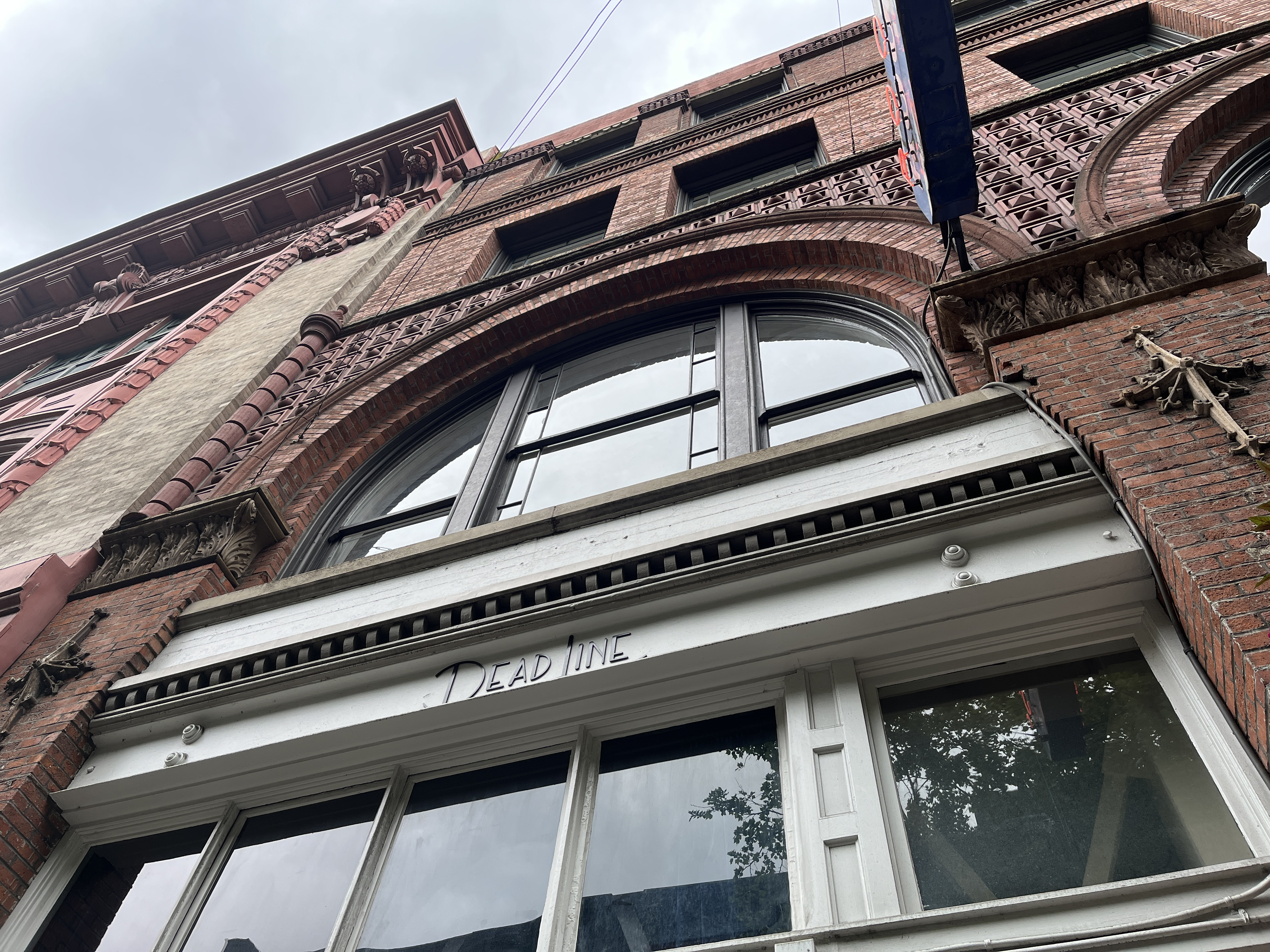
- The bar's exterior in 2023
- Interactive map of Dead Line

Restaurant information
- Established: July 2017
- Owner: Erik Hunter
- Location: 114 1st Avenue S, Seattle, King, Washington, 98104, United States
- Coordinates: 47.6012°N 122.3340°W

Dead Line is a bar and restaurant in Pioneer Square, Seattle, in the U.S. state of Washington. Owned by Erik Hunter, the bar was established in 2017 and serves Latin/South American cuisine.

== Description ==
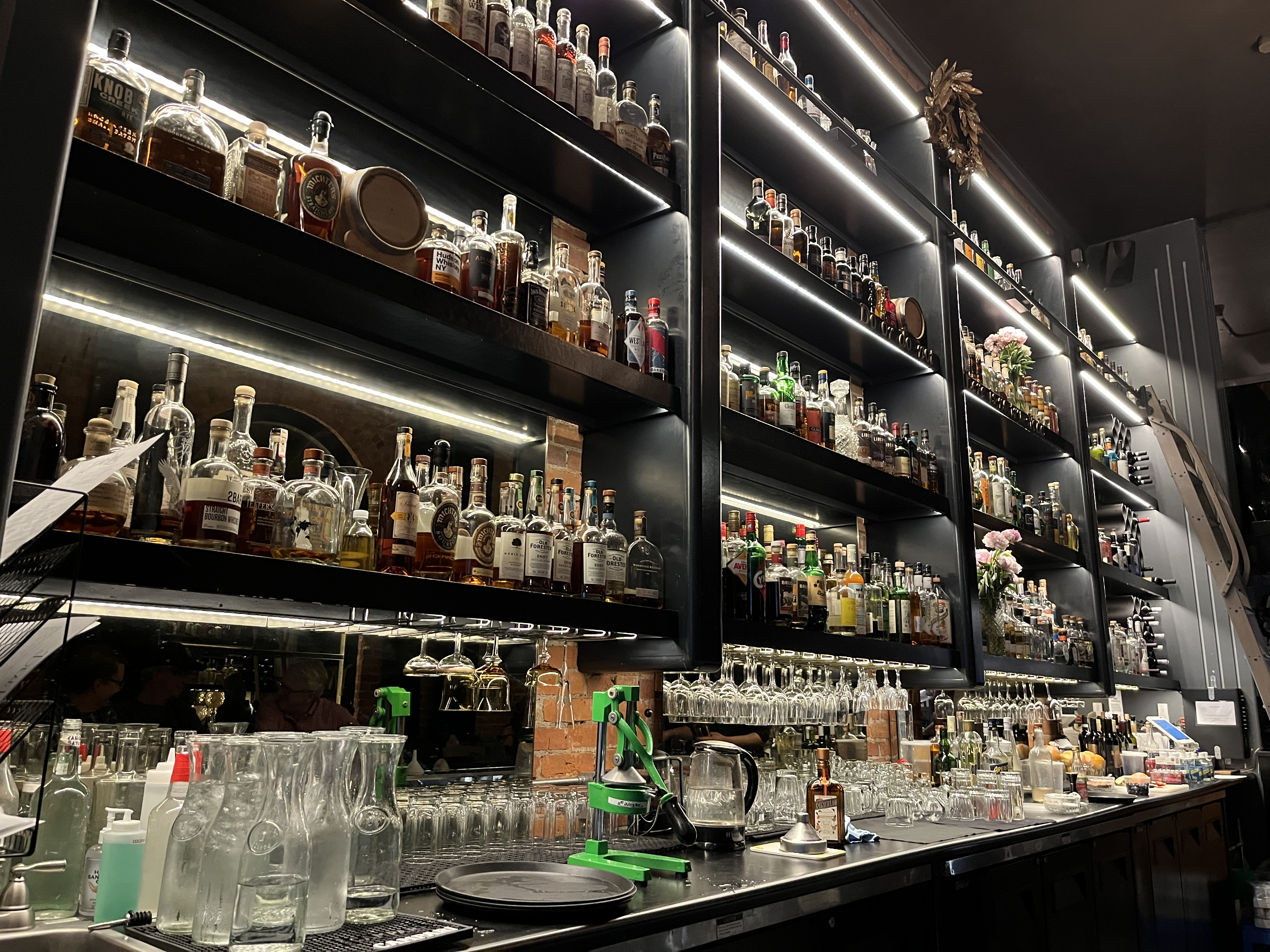
The bar's interior, 2023

Dead Line is a bar and restaurant in Pioneer Square, Seattle, named after a historical name for Yesler Way. Aimee Rizzo of The Infatuation says the "small, sleek, dark" bar with a ladder required to reach upper shelves. She also said the bar's Gold Room "looks like an antique parlor filled with old furniture".

AJ Rathbun of Seattle Magazine said of the interior: "Like many Pioneer Square spots, Dead Line is long and lean, with beautiful brick walls. They're adorned with tall velvet curtains and sparkly mirrors of all sizes, while two dim brass chandeliers provide the mood lighting. In the main space, you'll find aqua-colored booths with marble-topped tables, eight tall bar chairs and a handful of chairs at a 'kitchen' bar. An upstairs mezzanine opens when the downstairs room gets busy." Seattle Metropolitan's Stefan Milne said the bar has "a heavy dose of art-deco glitz—most manifest in the big gilded chandeliers and the two-story mirrored wall of liquors".

The Latin/South American and Mexican menu has included small plates such as arepas with braised brisket and squash al pastor tacos. During happy hour, complimentary plantain/yucca chips, olives, and spiced nuts are available with drink purchases. The drink menu includes cocktails, beer and wine.

== History ==
The bar opened in early July 2017. Erik Hunter is the owner.

Dead Line served Taylor Swift-inspired cocktails in 2023.

== Reception ==
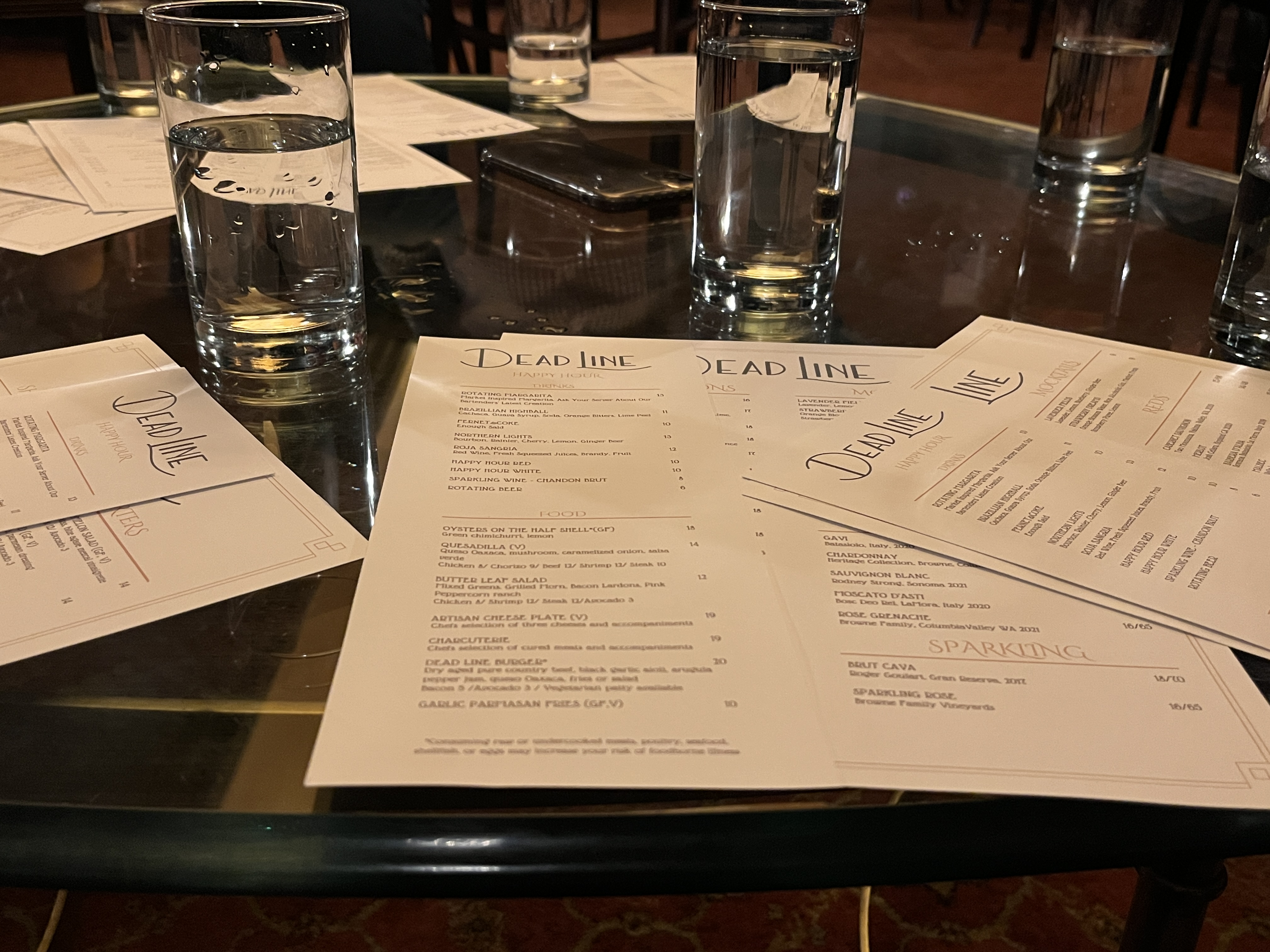
Menus on a table, 2023

In 2017, The Infatuation's Aimee Rizzo recommend taking advantage of happy hour and wrote, "Not only is it a fantastic space to go for fancy cocktails, but the dinner menu also has some pretty great South American small plates." In her 2023 overview of where to eat and drink in Pioneer Square, she said the cheeseburger is "so good we'd wait in a DMV line for one". Rizzo also included Dead Line in 2023 lists of the city's best burgers and 19 best bars in Seattle. Michelle Morton included Dead Line in the Daily Hive's 2019 list of 11 of Seattle's best cocktail bars.

AJ Rathbun of Seattle Magazine said, "Dead Line aims for a 1920s vibe and I think it works, especially with the dandy music selection ranging from era classics like the Ink Spots Into Each Life Some Rain Must Fall (a personal fave) to modern covers done swing- and big band-style. There's also The Gold Room in back, which has thick carpets, wing-back couches and period seats, and a lower volume. Designed for private parties, it serves as an additional spot for people who aren't looking for food, but prefer a mellower space to sip their drinks." Seattle Metropolitan's Stefan Milne said, "If Baz Luhrmann's 2013 The Great Gatsby boondoggle were a cocktail lounge, it might feel a lot like Dead Line."
