= Borgoño =

Borgoño is a surname. Notable people with this surname include:

- Justiniano Borgoño (1836–1921), Peruvian brigadier general and politician
- Luis Barros Borgoño (1858–1943), Chilean politician
- Manuel Barros Borgoño (1852–1903), Chilean physician
- Martina Barros Borgoño (1850–1944), Chilean writer and feminist
