= South American cuisine =

Culinary traditions of South America

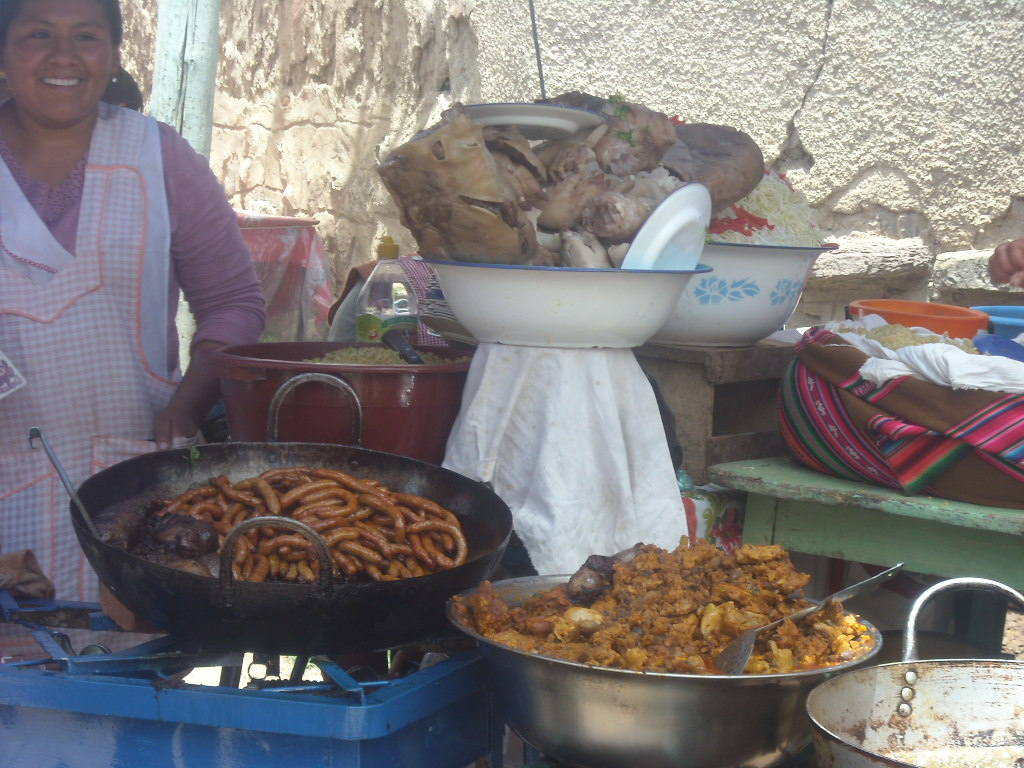
Peruvian cuisine—tarateño sausages and other foods sold by a street vendor in Tarata, Peru

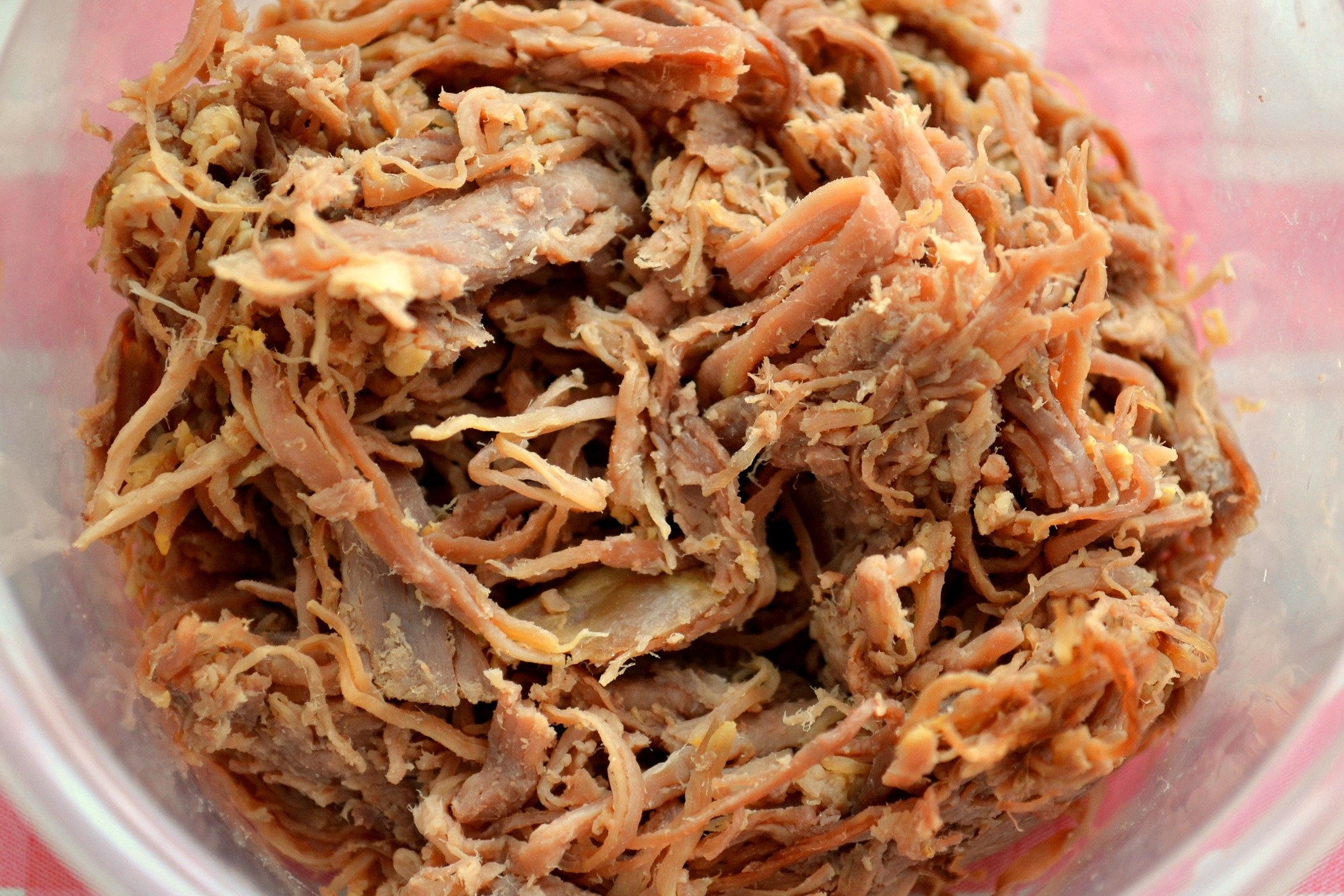
Shredded beef

South American cuisine has many influences, due to the ethnic fusion of South America. The most characteristic are Indigenous South American, Spanish, Portuguese, Italian, African, and Indian-South Asian. However, there is a mix of European, North American, and indigenous cuisines. The customs and food products greatly vary according to the physically distinct regions.

== Overview ==
The Amazon basin of South America provides a plethora of fresh fish and tropical fruits. The Pacific Ocean provides a large amount of seafood, such as king crab (typically caught at the southern end of the continent), lobster (found in great quantities from the Juan Fernández Islands), and Antarctic krill, which was recently discovered. Tuna and tropical fish are caught all around the continent but are notably found in abundance near Easter Island.

The many plains on this continent make it rich for growing foods like cereals, potatoes and quinoa. In the Patagonia region in the south of Argentina, many people raise sheep and cattle. In Brazil, a traditional dish is feijoada, a stew consisting of beans with beef and pork. Rice and beans is also very common in Brazil.

Peruvian cuisine is largely influenced by traditional Incan culture (see Incan cuisine). The consumption of carne asada is widespread throughout much of the continent. (Note: There appears to only be circumstantial evidence, for which there are a few references. (Note: “The Origins and Traditions of Carne Asada.” The Spruce, 1996, www.thespruce.com/carne-asada-mexican-steak-331500.) (Note: Martin, Sasha. “Barbecued Meat:Carne Asada.” Global Table Adventure, August 21, 2015, globaltableadventure.com/recipe/recipe-barbecued-meat-carne-asada-w-poll/.Which by the way, they source "Life from Scratch" A National Geographic Special Book)) It is popular to grill in the open air as in asado or churrasco.

Shredded beef is common throughout South America and Latin America and is served with a variety of foods.

== By region ==
=== Andes ===
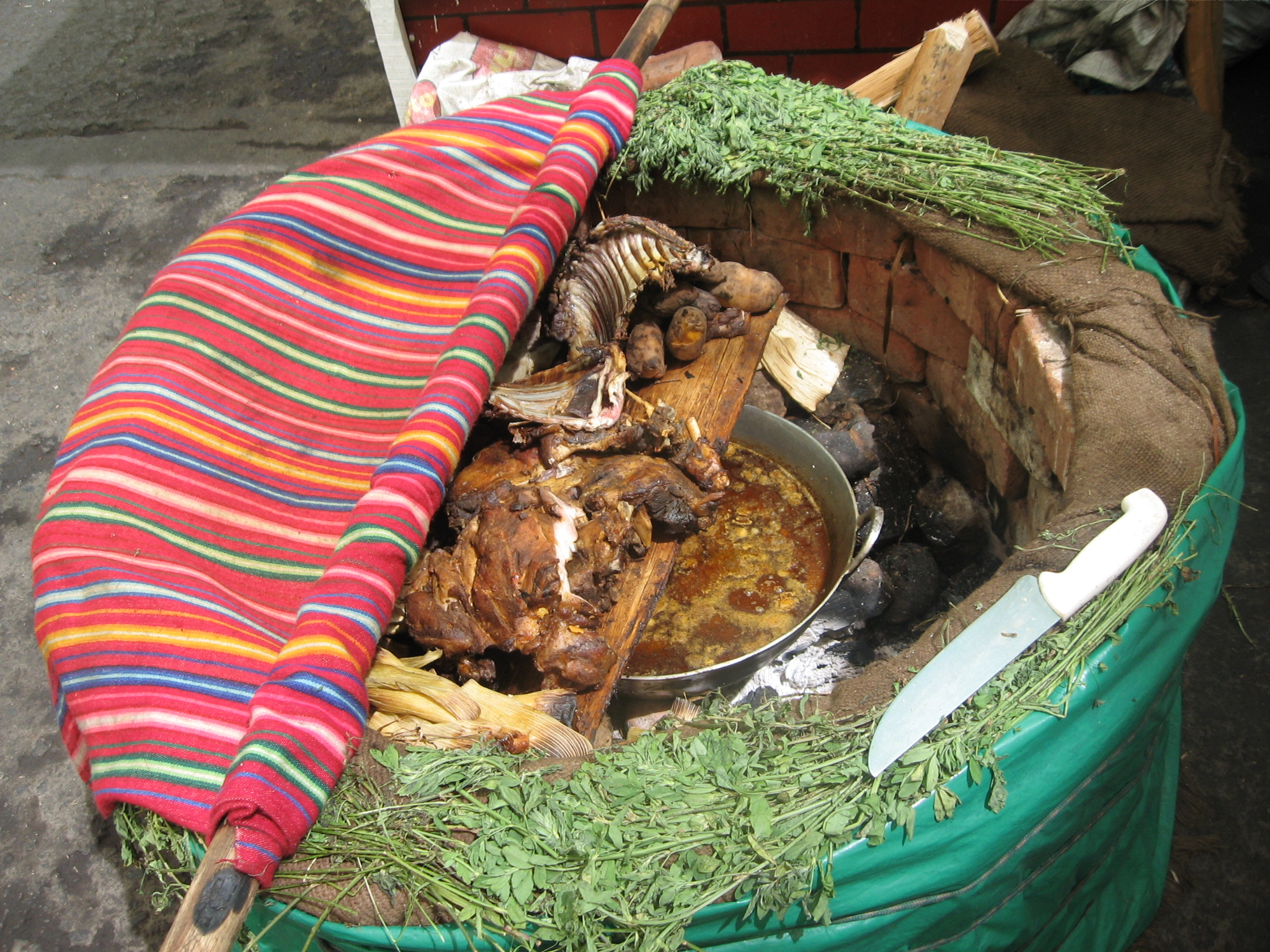
Pachamanca

The food of the Andes is highly influenced by the indigenous peoples. The principal foods continue to be corn, potatoes and other tubers. The meats most characteristic of this zone are the llama (Peru) and the guinea pig (Chile, Bolivia, Peru, Colombia and the Argentine northwest). In areas where there is fresh water, trout is consumed.

Chupe andino refers to various stews and soups that are prepared in the Andes mountains region. One of the most important drinks is chicha. Important dishes include humitas, locro, chanfaina, arepas, quimbolitos (dessert tamales), and peppers. A famous dish from the Ecuadorian Andes is pachamanca. From the mixture of German, native cuisine, and the Chiloé Archipelago in the southern Andes comes valdiviano and curanto.

The wetter areas of Peru produce sugar cane, lemon, bananas, and oranges. Chancaca is popular as well as carbonara, sancocho, huevos quimbos, potato pie, and ch'arki.

=== Pampas ===
The pampas have the most Italian and Spanish influences. In Argentina, they are the center of the three typical Argentine dishes dulce de leche, asado (churrasco in Brazil), and milanesa.

Argentine pizza is different from Italian pizza, being closer to calzones. Pasta and polenta are common in Argentina and on the Pampas generally. Empanadas and choripán are very popular fast food in Argentina and Uruguay. Churros, ensaïmada, alfajor, Spanish tortillas with potato, meatballs, sopa de mondongo, and puchero are Spanish-derived Pampas cuisine. Mate is popular on the Pampas.

=== Tropical ===
The tropical region of the continent is divided into two distinct areas, the coastal areas of the Atlantic and the Pacific and the Amazon area, each with its distinct cuisines. Much of the fruits that are considered to be exotic are common in the tropical forests and fields, such as guava, pineapple, papaya, mango, banana, and elderberry.

The climate and geography also favour a great variety of crops: potatoes, sweet potatoes, cassava, complemented with meat and fish; grains, principally rice, corn, and wheat and beans.

In the coastal area ceviche, tostones or patacón, arepa, chipa, sancocho, pabellón criollo, bandeja paisa, guatita, and sopa paraguaya are common dishes.

In Brazil, foods such as feijoada, arroz carreteiro (cart riders rice), coxinha, and farofa are common throughout the country. The Brazilian state of Bahia has its own cuisine which has heavy African influences.

The Amazon area is known for its utilization of native meats such as the capybara, turtles, peccary, and paca. Common dishes are juane, tacacho, tacacá. There are a wide variety of fruits native to the Amazon with which a great variety of drinks are prepared.

== Diffusion ==
=== Australia ===
As early as the 1950s, Latin American cuisine have been transported to the Southeast coast, where Sydney is. Now there is a slight selection of Latin American restaurants that has spread across the country.

=== United States ===
Early South American restaurants in the United States included Caso do Brazil in Reseda, California, which opened in 1955, and the Machu Picchu nightclub in Miami, Florida, which opened in 1963, serving Peruvian dishes such as ceviche and anticuchos. South American foods are increasingly imported into the United States, especially Brazilian foods such as guarana, guava paste, and cachaça (an ingredient in the caipirinha cocktail).

== Gallery ==
South American cuisine at restaurants

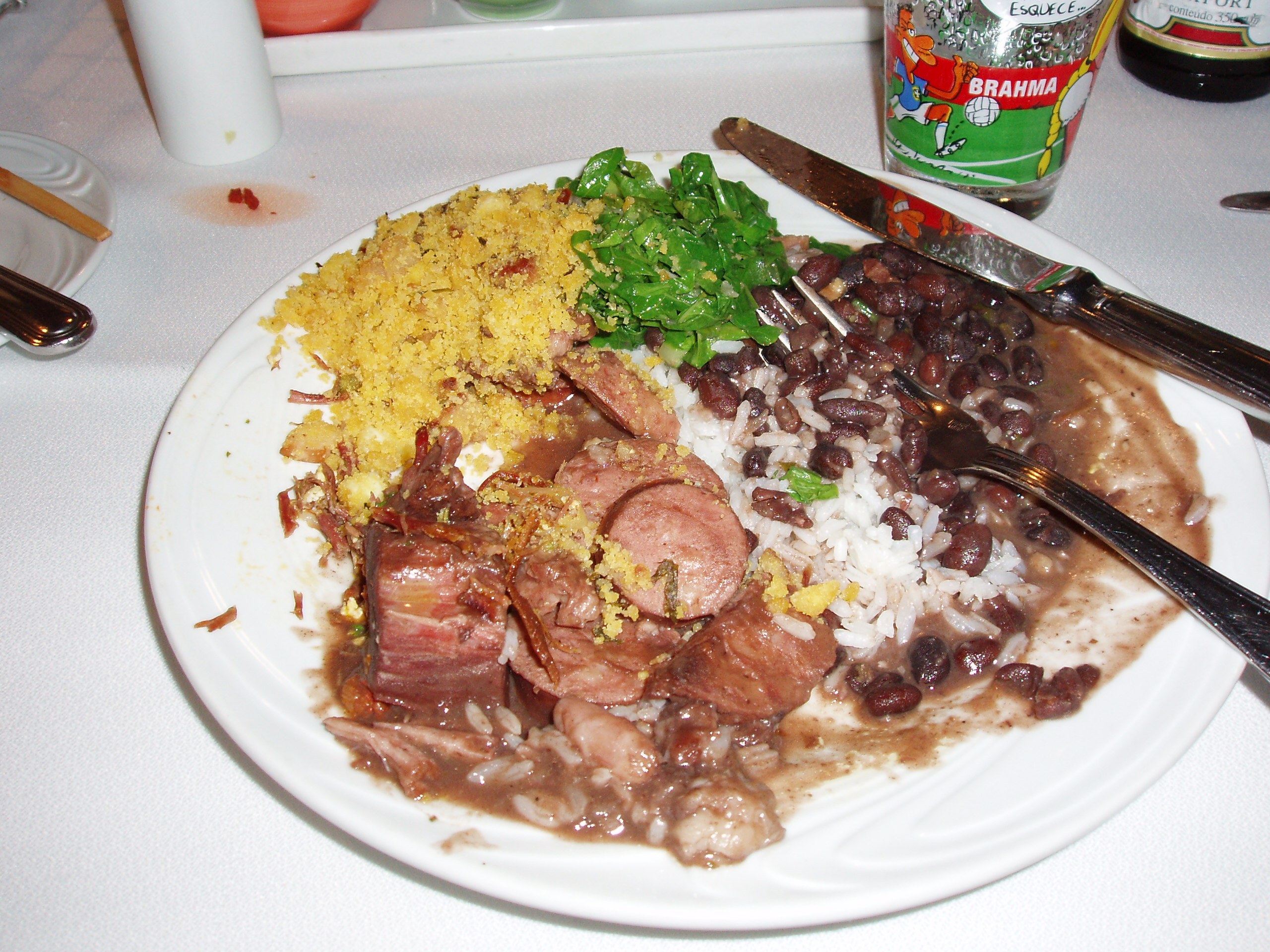
Feijoada, a bean stew that is Brazil's national dish

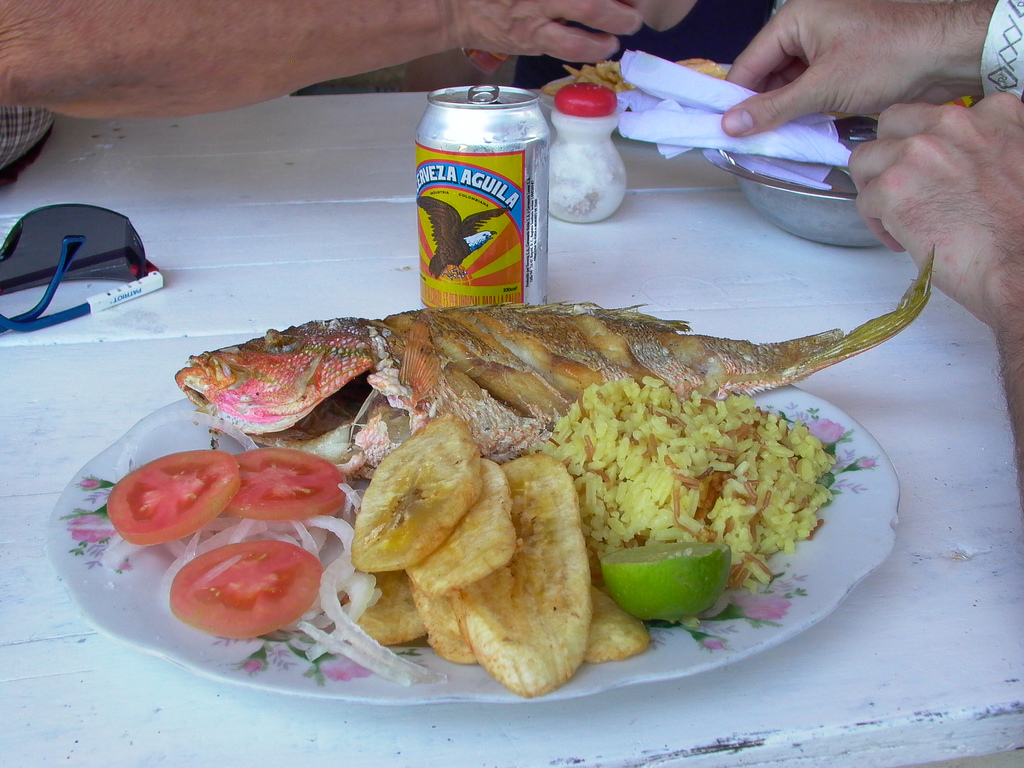
Fried red snapper

== See also ==
- Latin American cuisine
- Brazilian cuisine
- Argentine cuisine
- Chilean cuisine
- Peruvian cuisine
- Indigenous cuisine of South America
- Chifa
