= Los de Ramón =

Chilean folkloric group

- Origin: Chile
- Genres: Folkloric
- Members: Raúl de Ramón; María Eugenia Silva; Carlos Alberto; Raul Eduardo
- Website: www.losderamon.scd.cl/inicio.htm

Los de Ramón are a Chilean folkloric group, composed of the family group of Raul de Ramon, his wife Maria Eugenia and his two children Carlos Alberto and Raul Eduardo. With Chomedahue —in the commune of Santa Cruz— as their origin, they were dedicated to the investigation of Chilean and Latin American folklore interpreting its songs with the typical instruments of each country having in its presentations more of sixty different musical instruments played by themselves which were interchanged according to each country and region. They gave numerous concerts in the US (92 concerts), Mexico, and in the rest of Latin America.

They recorded more than thirteen longplays two of them made in Mexico with music from Chile and also from Latin America. Some of them are Arreo en el Viento, Nostagia Colchaguina, An image of Chile, Latino America folkloric Panorama (2 discs), Los de Ramon in Family, Chilean Mass and others. They received several prizes in Chile as in Mexico and made popular many songs of Raul de Ramon like The Curanto, Rosa Colorada, Nostalgia Colchaguina, Camino de Soledad, Cancion de la Caballeria among others. They were the first in Chile in using the typical instruments of each country influencing in other musical groups that adopted this initiative later. They became part of the traditional folkloric music that gave impulse to Chilean music.

The band opened a restaurant named El Alero de Los de Ramon, dedicated to the diffusion of folkloric music and their traditions.

They also contribute in the creation of new folkloric musical groups such as Los Cantores de Santa Cruz and Los de Santiago among others.

Raul de Ramon and Maria Eugenia were declared Illustrious Sons of Santa Cruz in Colchagua and with their children they have a space in the Museum of Colchagua in this city. Nowadays only their sons are still alive, Raul de Ramon died in April 1984 and Maria Eugenia in March 2002

== Discography ==
- Los de Ramón (1960)
- Fiesta Venezolana (1961)
- Arreo en el Viento (1962)
- Nostalgia Colchaguina (1963)
- Una Imagen de Chile (1964)
- Paisaje Humano de Chile (1966)
- Panorama Folklorico Latinoamericano (2) (1966)
- Los de Ramón en Familia (1967)
- El Arca de Los de Ramón (1968)
- Los de Ramón en América (1969)
- Viento en el Tamarugal (1968)
- Misa Chilena (1965)
- Lo Mejor de Los de Ramón (1979)
