= Luis Aguirre Pinto =

Chilean composer (born 1907)

M. Luis Aguirre Pinto (10 August 1907 – 7 July 1997) was a Chilean composer, folk musician and folklorist. An honorary citizen of the city of Valdivia, he was born in Copiapo but moved, at the age of seven years, to Santiago.

== Education and career ==
In Santiago Luis Aguirre Pinto studied at the Liceo José Victorino Lastarria and Manuel Barros Borgoño. In 1924, at the age of 17 years, with the song Lluvia de besos (Rain of kisses) he won a competition held by the Odeon label. Four years later he began his first continental tour with Angela Ferrari, European tango performer, and in Lima, composed one of his first popular songs, the waltz Reminiscencia.

‘’Therefore‘’Upon returning to Chile, he created his orchestra with which he recorded and accompanied many artists and even composed themes for early films. Among them were, Chile's first talking film, Hombres del sur (Men of the south). He did the songs Rayo de luna (Moonbeam) and Canción de ausencia (Song of absence). He also collaborated on the films Llampo de sangre and Tierra quemada.

His most important songs are Camino agreste (1950) and Camino de luna (1958), lyrics devoted to the southern cities of Corral, Valdivia and Niebla. Camino de luna earned him the title of Honorary Citizen of the city of Valdivia.

At the end of his career he also served in management positions in the Chilean Society of Copyrights.

== Main works ==
- Lluvia de besos
- Reminiscencia
- Diamante azul
- Un día llegarás
- Dudas de mí
- Camino agreste
- Camino de luna
- Canción del carretero
- Nieve en el corazón
- Luna que sabes de amores
- Tus trenzas
- Luna striptisera
- El indio y su mula
