= Pochas =

Spanish type of string bean

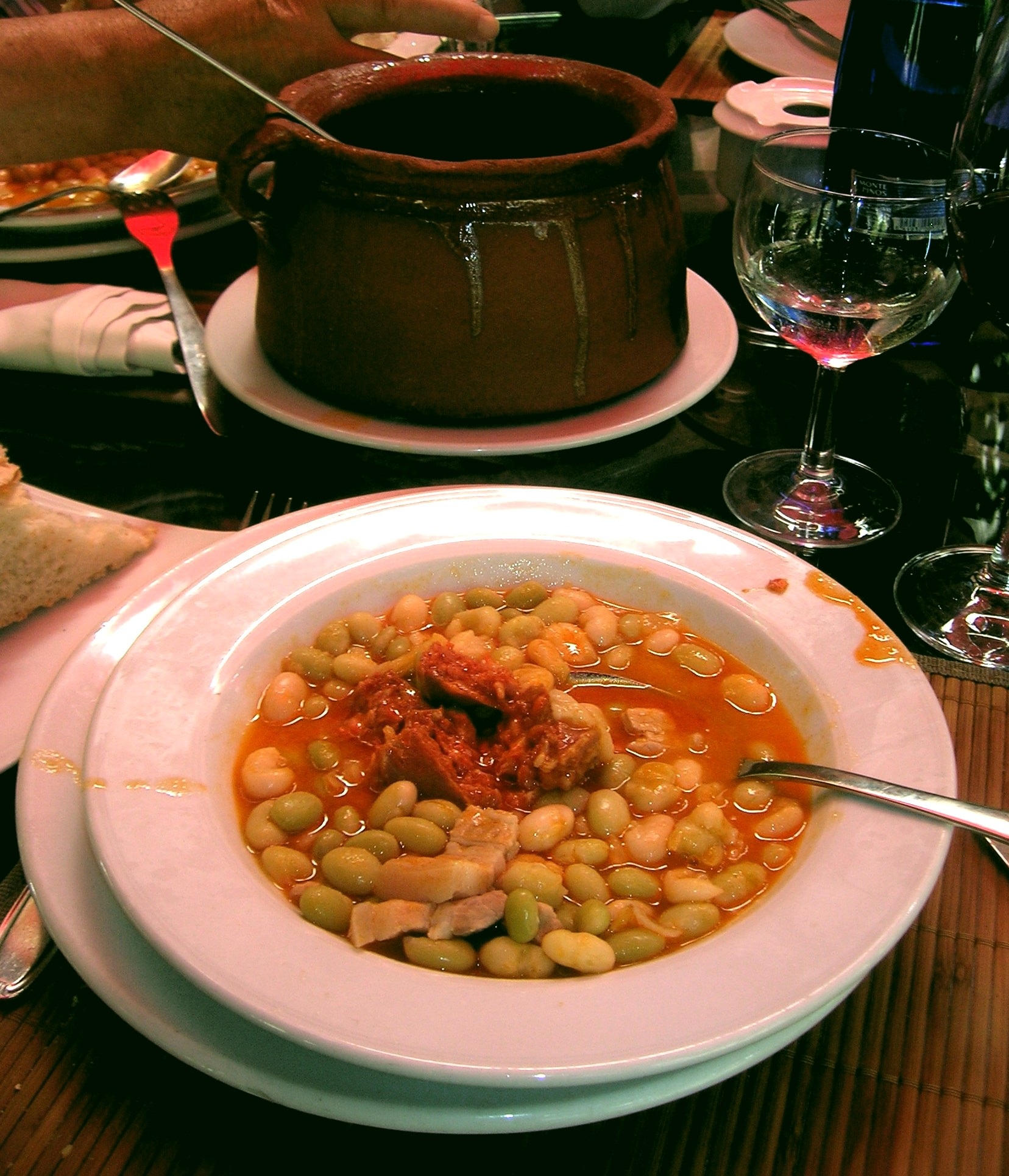
Riojan pochas

Pochas are a type of Spanish string bean, which originated in the regions of La Rioja and Navarre. The beans are served ripe, rather than dried and re-hydrated.
