= Valdiviano =

Soup dish in Chile

- Type: Stew
- Course: Main
- Place of origin: Chile, South America
- Serving temperature: Hot
- Main ingredients: Charqui (jerky), onions, cooking oil, onions, parsley, oregano, cumin and chilli.
- Variations: Charquicán

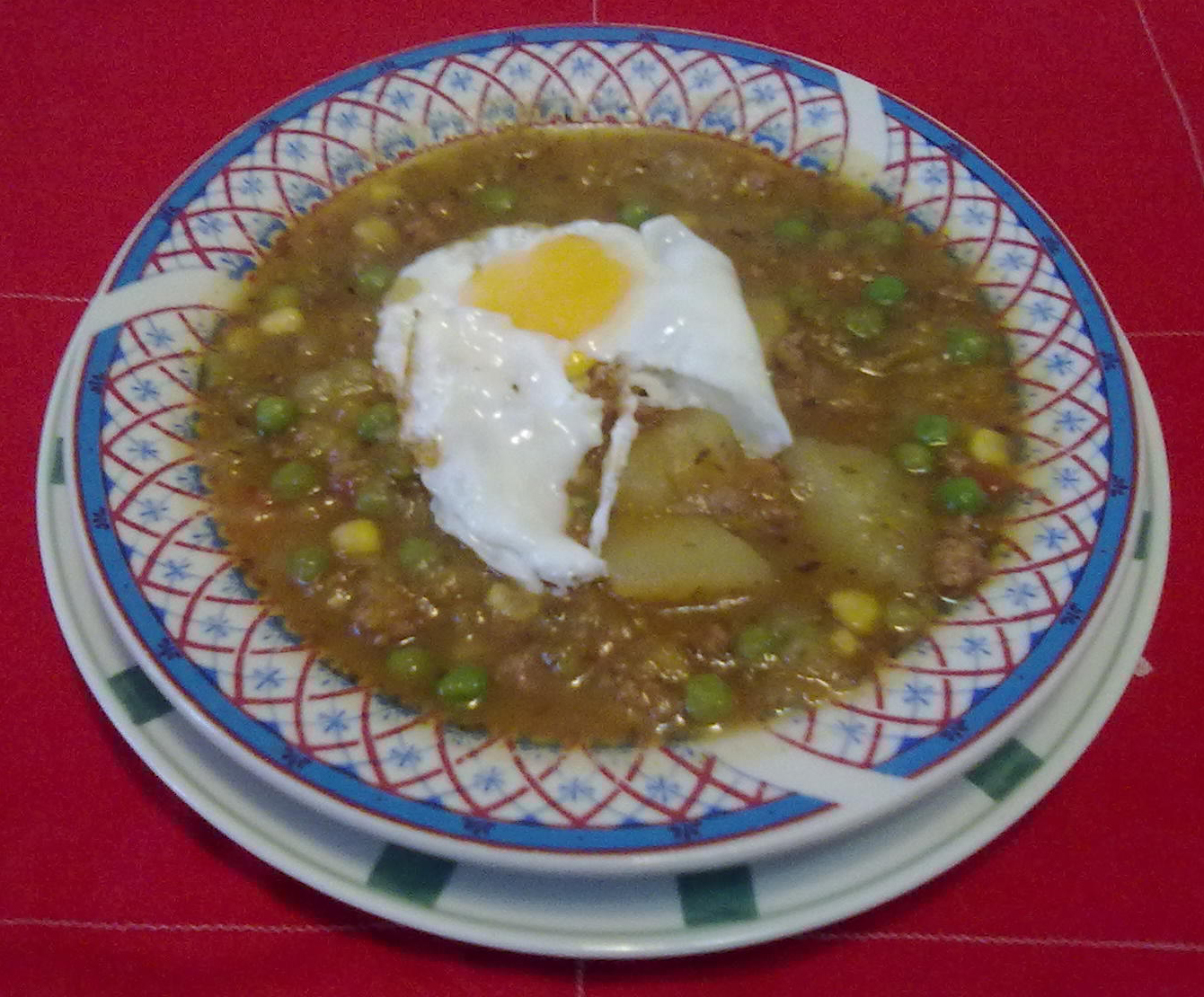
Charquicán

Valdiviano, as well as referring to inhabitants of Valdivia, Chile, is a Chilean dish, consisting of a soup made with charqui (jerky) and onions.

== History ==
In 1598, after the Disaster of Curalaba where the Spanish conquistadors lost almost half their territory in what was then the province of Chile, the city of Valdivia remained as one of the last Spanish strongholds. The soldiers isolated there were supplied with large amounts of jerky produced in central Chile. Tired of eating jerky, the soldiers created this dish, combining jerky with a few other ingredients to create the Valdiviano soup.

== Ingredients ==
Charqui, cooking oil, onions, parsley, oregano, cumin, chilli.

=== Variations ===
Modern versions replace charqui for minced meat, similar to the preparation of Charquicán, or leftover pieces of meat from a barbecue.

== See also ==
- Chilean Cuisine
- Valdivia, Chile
- Disaster of Curalaba
- Charquicán
