= Chomedahue =

Village in the O'Higgins Region, Chile

Coordinates: 34°39′S 71°20′W

- Village
- Interactive map of Chomedahue
- Country: Chile
- Region: (O'Higgins Region) O'Higgins
- Provinces: Colchagua
- City: Santa Cruz

Government
  - Mayor of Santa Cruz: William Arévalo

Chomedahue is a small town located in the Chilean commune of Santa Cruz, Colchagua province.
