= Raúl de Ramón =

Raúl de Ramón, full name Raúl Alberto de Ramón García del Postigo, (May 12, 1929, Santiago de Chile — April 1984) was a Chilean composer, musician and folklorist and author of numerous widely known songs in Chile, such as The Curanto, Nostalgia Colchaguina, Camino de Soledad, Rosa Colorada, Canción de la Caballería, El Amor del Arriero and many more.

He married María Eugenia Silva Fuentes and together they produced two children, Carlos Alberto (lawyer), and Raúl Eduardo (neurosurgeon). He performed alongside his wife and his two children in the group Los de Ramón with whom he traveled and presented Chilean music in the entire U.S.A. Throughout his career he performed in more than 92 concerts and travelled throughout Mexico and the rest of the countries of Latin America.

== Education ==
De Ramón studied at The Grange School in Santiago and soon graduated as an architect from the Catholic University of Chile. He spent an important part of its youth in the country in the Colchagua province where he became absorbed by the fundamentals of the Chilean culture of the Central Zone, crossing it by horse and taking feeling of its roots, falling in love deeply with the basis of Chilean heritage which would be reflected widely in his later work.

== Career ==
He formed his first group while in University. It was called "Los Huincas" with his childhood friend Rogelio Muñoz. Afterwards he and his wife formed Los de Ramón into which he later integrated his two children. Not only did he investigate and carry out a deep study into Chilean folklore but he also did the same with Latin American folklore. Along with his wife he collected an extensive compilation of songs, rhythms and clothes from the different countries.

They held meetings in their house with folklorists from all the countries of Latin America where their music was sung. Persons sometimes referred to these meetings as a small O.A.S. In their productions they sang songs from all the Latin American countries, each interpreted with the instruments typical of each country. They used more than sixty different instruments played all by themselves. They also recorded songs from the north, center and south of Chile. Some of their published CDs include: Arreo en el Viento, Nostalgia Colchaguina, An image of Chile, Human Landscape of Chile, Latin American Folkloric Panorama (published in Mexico, 2 longplays), Los de Ramón in Family and Chilean Mass, among others.

Raúl de Ramón also helped with the formation of new Chilean folk music groups such as Los Cantores de Santa Cruz, Los de Santiago and others.

His impact went beyond the music. He contributed towards the construction of Chilean houses and the introduction of a Chilean Mass. He even published, in France, the creation of a still unpublished musical comedy. He opened a restaurant, El Alero de los de Ramón, where Chilean music was played and typical Chilean food was eaten. He was named "Illustrious Son of Santa Cruz" for his collaboration to this city and has, together with his family, a place at the Museum of Colchagua in this city. He died in April 1984 at 55 years of age.

== Works ==
With his family, he recorded more than thirteen long plays, two of them in Mexico, using his own creations and with compilations of folklore music from throughout Latin America. He also published some books on Chilean literature, including, El Caballero y sus Dragones a rural Chilean novel; Raíces en la Bruma, a poetry book, and Arreo en el Viento, a compilation of important parts of his musical work.

== Recordings ==
- Los de Ramón (1960)
- Fiesta Venezolana (1961)
- Arreo en el Viento (1962)
- Nostalgia Colchaguina (1963)
- Una Imagen de Chile (1964)
- Paisaje Humano de Chile (1966)
- Panorama Folklorico Latinoamericano (2) (1966)
- Los de Ramón en Familia (1967)
- El Arca de Los de Ramón (1968)
- Los de Ramón en América (1969)
- Viento en el Tamarugal (1968)
- Misa Chilena (1965)
- Lo Mejor de Los de Ramón (1979)
