= Charquicán =

Stew consumed in the Andean region

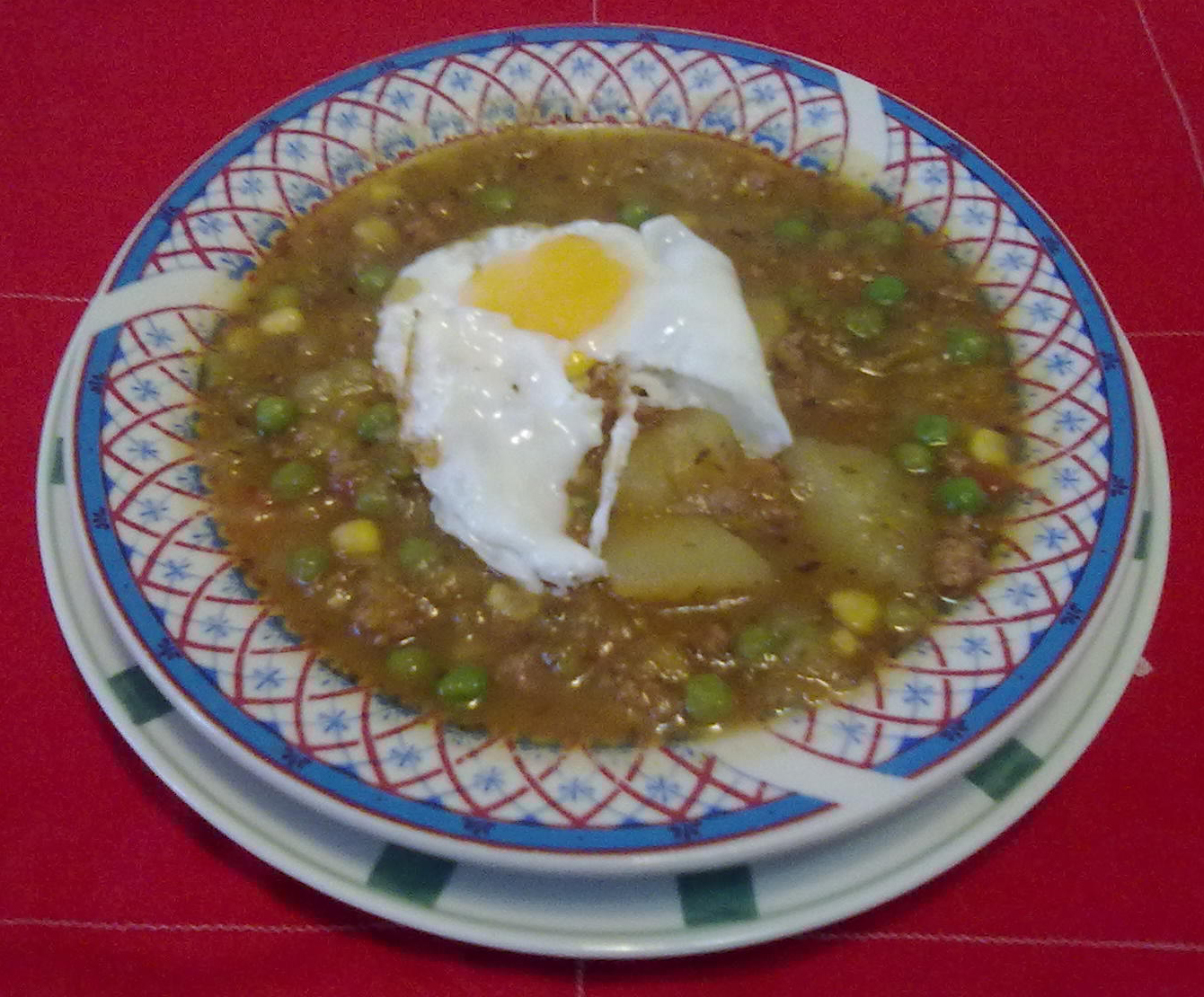
- Charquicán
- Type: Dry meat
- Course: Main
- Place of origin: Argentina, Bolivia, Chile, Peru
- Region or state: Andean
- Created by: Aymara
- Serving temperature: Hot
- Main ingredients: ch'arki (jerky), potato, pumpkin (squash), corn, onion, paprika, oregano, cumin, salt, pepper
- Variations: Valdiviano, Tomatican. Modern versions use minced meat instead of jerky.
- Food energy (per serving): Energy: 391 Kcal: Protein: 17.1 g; Total fat: 11.1 g; Cholesterol: 29.2 mg.; H. Carbon: 57.4 g; Dietary Fiber: 9.6 g; Sodium: 151 mg.

Charquicán is the dry meat popular in Incas times, used in different dishes around the Andean region. Charquican in Chile is a popular stew. A similar dish eaten in Northwest Argentina is called charquisillo, a dish made with ch’arki and rice.

Chilean Charquicán is made with charqui, or beef, potatoes, pumpkin, white corn, onions, and sometimes peas and corn. It was originally made from dried and salted llama meat or beef. The modern Chilean version of Charquicán is made with minced beef and topped with a fried egg.

In Peru, fish charqui is used, usually Guitarra fish. It is typically consumed during Easter. The fish stew is combined with diced potatoes and served with a side of white rice and sometimes chickpeas.

== Origins ==
The word "charquicán," from charquikanka, is thought to be a Quechua word meaning "stew with ch'arki". An alternative theory posits that it is a hybrid word of the Quechua ch'arki and the Mapudungun cancan (dried roasted meat). This dish was commonly eaten by merchants travelling between the port of Arica and the mines of Potosí and by peasants travelling with herds of livestock. Later, in the times of the Chilean War of Independence, the Charquicán cuyano was a frequently eaten by the soldiers of the Army of the Andes.

== Variation ==
- Tomatican: has added tomatoes.
- Charquicán of quchayuyu, or Cochayuyicán: Meat or jerky replaced with quchayuyu seaweed (Durvillaea antarctica).

== See also ==
- Chilean Cuisine
- List of stews
