= Chilean salad =

Chilean mixed vegetable dish

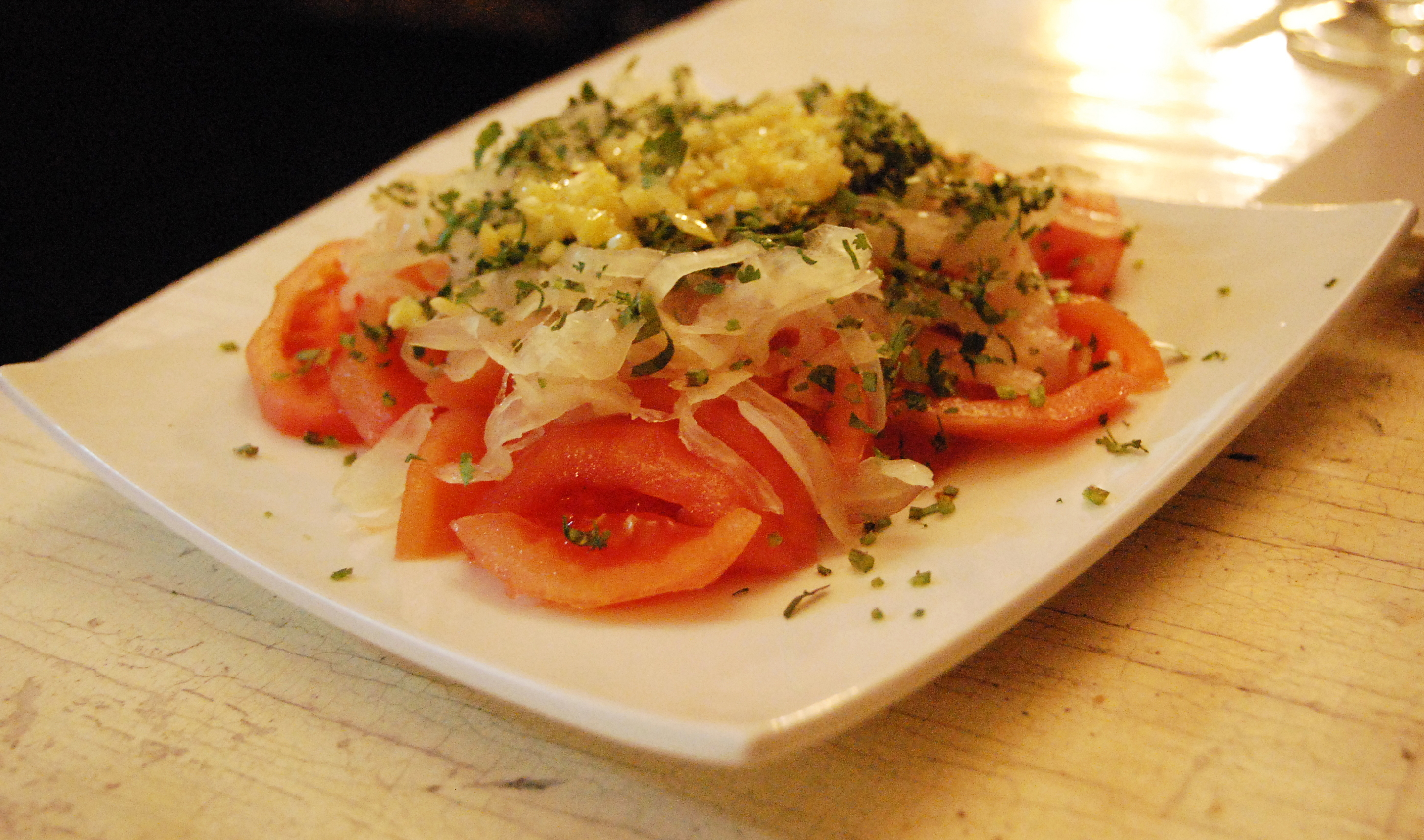
- Traditional Chilean salad
- Type: Salad
- Course: Side
- Place of origin: Chile
- Region or state: South America
- Main ingredients: Tomatoes, onions, coriander, olive oil
- Variations: Many

Chilean salad or ensalada chilena is a salad containing tomato, onion, coriander and olive oil, and sometimes chili peppers.

The onion may be soaked in boiling salted water, to soften it and reduce its sharpness. It may also be soaked in cold water for an hour or so, or marinated with vinegar. This dish is eaten traditionally during Easter.

== See also ==
- List of salads
