= Manuel Barros Borgoño =

Chilean physician

Manuel Barros Borgoño (1852–1903) was a Chilean physician and the Head of the University of Chile starting in 1901.

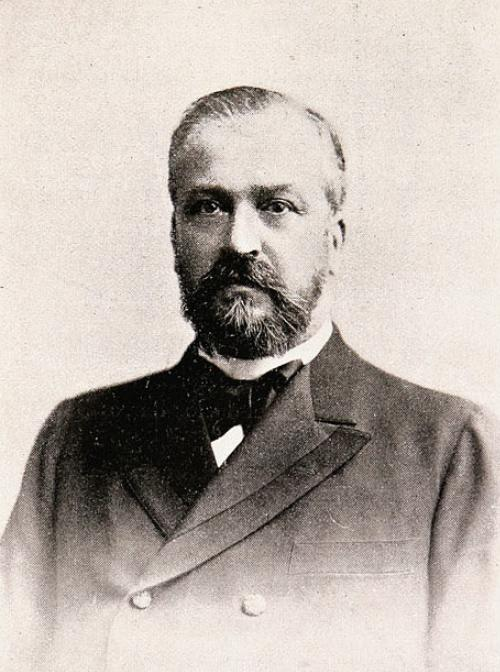
Manuel Barros Borgoño (1902)
