= Morning Sun Eatery =

Restaurant in Quezon City, Philippines

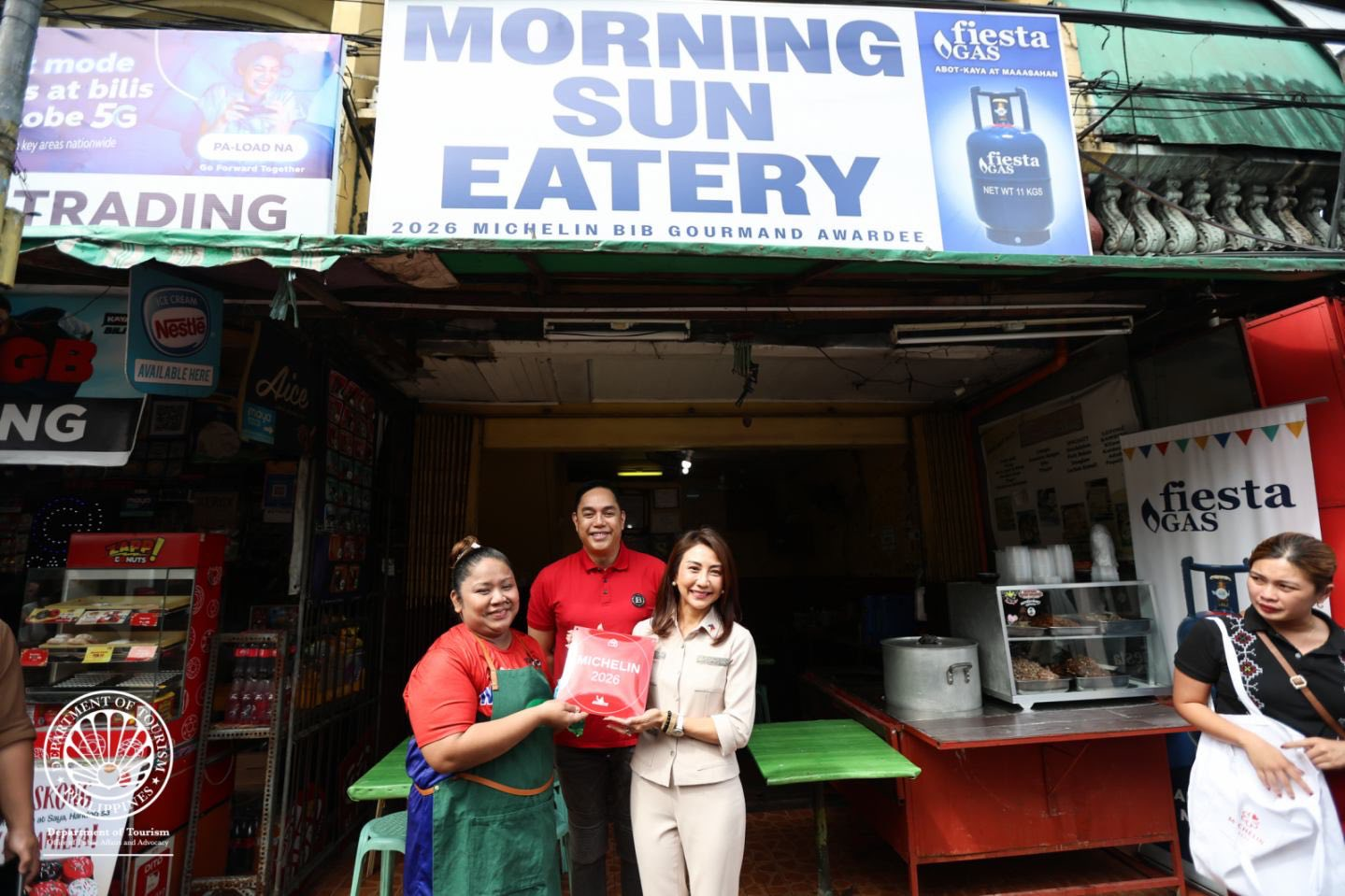
- Tourism Secretary Christina Frasco (right) presenting Morning Sun Eatery co-owner Lyn Mortera (left) with a Michelin Bib Gourmand plaque right outside the restaurant in 2025

Restaurant information
- Established: 1990
- Location: Quezon City, Philippines

Morning Sun Eatery is a Filipino restaurant and carinderia located at 120 J.P. Rizal Street in Project 4, Quezon City, Philippines. Owned by Elizabeth Mortera, the establishment specializes in Ilocano cuisine and grilled dishes. In 2025, it was awarded a Bib Gourmand distinction in the inaugural Michelin Guide for Manila and Cebu.

== History ==
The eatery was founded by Elizabeth "Nanay Beth" Mortera. Before opening the business, Mortera worked as a nanny in Dubai. During her time abroad, she read cookbooks to learn how to cook. She returned to the Philippines and opened the eatery in the 1990s. The business has been in operation for over 30 years. The income from the eatery allowed Mortera to pay for the education of her children. One of her children graduated with a degree in Hotel and Restaurant Management (HRM). The restaurant is currently managed by Elizabeth and her daughter, Lyn.

== Cuisine and operations ==
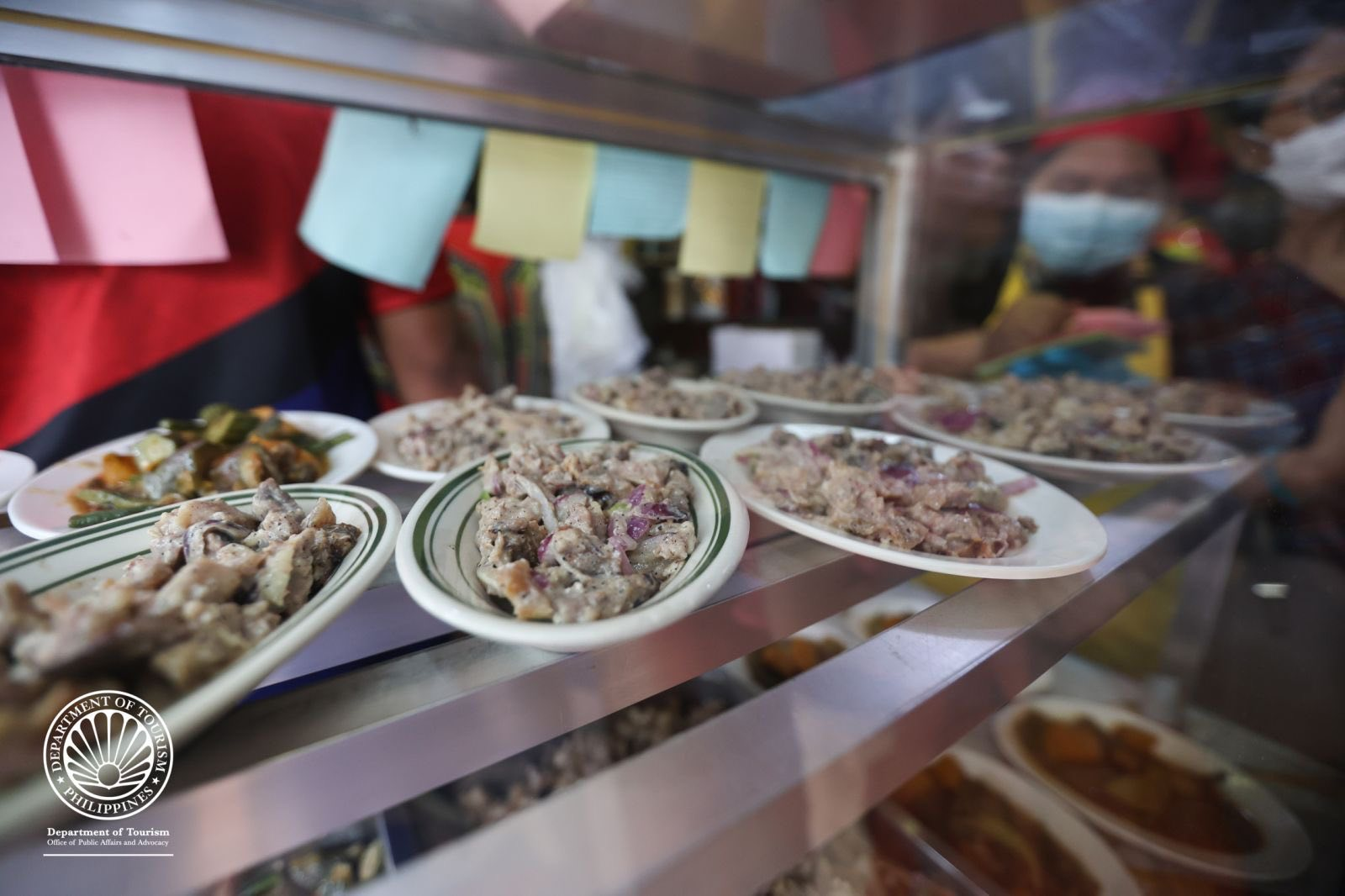
Dinakdakan at Morning Sun Eatery

Morning Sun Eatery operates as a casual roadside diner. It utilizes a turo-turo style of service where customers select food displayed at a counter.

The menu focuses on home-style Ilocano dishes. Specialties include dinakdakan, kilawin, and pork barbecue. The restaurant also serves pinakbet, laing, dinengdeng, and papaitan. Other offerings include grilled items such as isaw (chicken or pork intestines) and chicharon bulaklak. The Michelin Guide highlighted the restaurant's laing as a standout dish. The owners have stated that they intend to keep prices affordable despite their increased popularity.

== Reception ==
The eatery has been a local favorite in Quezon City since the late 1990s. It was visited by PBA players and actors in its earlier years. In 2021, chef JP Anglo vlogged about the restaurant and praised its food.

In October 2025, Morning Sun Eatery was announced as a Bib Gourmand awardee in the 2026 Michelin Guide for the Philippines. It was one of 25 establishments to receive this distinction in the inaugural list. Following the announcement, the restaurant reported that its daily sales had doubled. The volume of food prepared daily was increased to meet the demand. Customers formed long lines outside the establishment, with some dishes selling out before lunch.

The restaurant was the first stop of the Department of Tourism's "Michelin Resto-run Caravan" in December 2025. Tourism Secretary Christina Frasco presented the Bib Gourmand plaque to the owners during this visit. The Quezon City government also included Morning Sun Eatery in its "Food Crawl Challenge" to promote local tourism. Other local officials, such as Vice Mayor Gian Sotto, have also visited the eatery.
