= 'Ota 'ika =

Polynesian dish

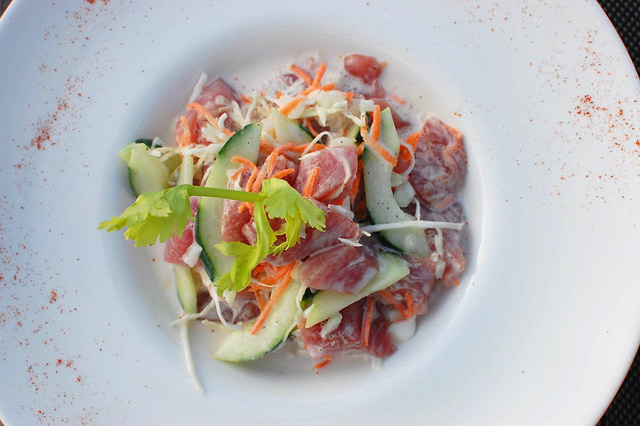
- ʻOta ʻika
- Alternative names: Coconut fish, ika mata, iʻa ota, kokoda, oka iʻa, oraora, ota, poisson cru
- Type: Salad
- Course: Appetiser
- Place of origin: Oceania
- Region or state: American Samoa, Cook Islands, Fiji, French Polynesia, Kiribati, Nauru, New Zealand, Niue, Norfolk Island, Papua New Guinea, Pitcairn Islands, Samoa, Tokelau, Tonga, Tuvalu, Wallis and Futuna
- Main ingredients: Fish, lemon, lime, coconut milk
- Similar dishes: Kinilaw, kelaguen, hinava, poke, ceviche

ʻOta ʻika is a Oceanian dish consisting of raw fish marinated in citrus juice and coconut milk. The Tongan, Tahitian, and Samoan variants are essentially identical in that the raw fish is briefly marinated in lemon or lime juice until the surface of the flesh becomes opaque. The fish is then mixed with coconut milk and diced vegetables (most commonly cucumber, tomato, carrots, onion, green onion, and spicy peppers). This is the national dish of Tonga.

== Names ==
- Cook Islands: Ika mata
- Fiji: Kokoda
- French Polynesia: Poisson cru, Iʻa ota
- Hawaii: Iʻa maka
- Nauru: Coconut fish
- New Caledonia: Salade tahitienne, Poisson cru
- New Zealand: Ika mata
- Niue: ʻota ʻika
- Samoa: Oka iʻa
- Tokelau: ʻota ʻika
- Tonga: ʻota ʻika
- Tuvalu: Ika mata
- Wallis and Futuna: Ika ota

The word "ota" means "raw" within the Polynesian language group, although the more common term for the dish in French Polynesia is its French equivalent, poisson cru (literally, 'raw fish'). Any type of seafood can be used to make "ota". The word "ika" means fish ("i'a" in Samoan language), but the dish is often prepared with mussels ("ota pipi/maso"), prawns ("ota ulavai"), crab ("ota pa'a/paka"), lobster ("ota ula"), octopus/squid ("ota fe'e/feke"), sea urchin ("ota vana/tuitui"), and eel ("ota pusi").

== Gallery ==
Variants

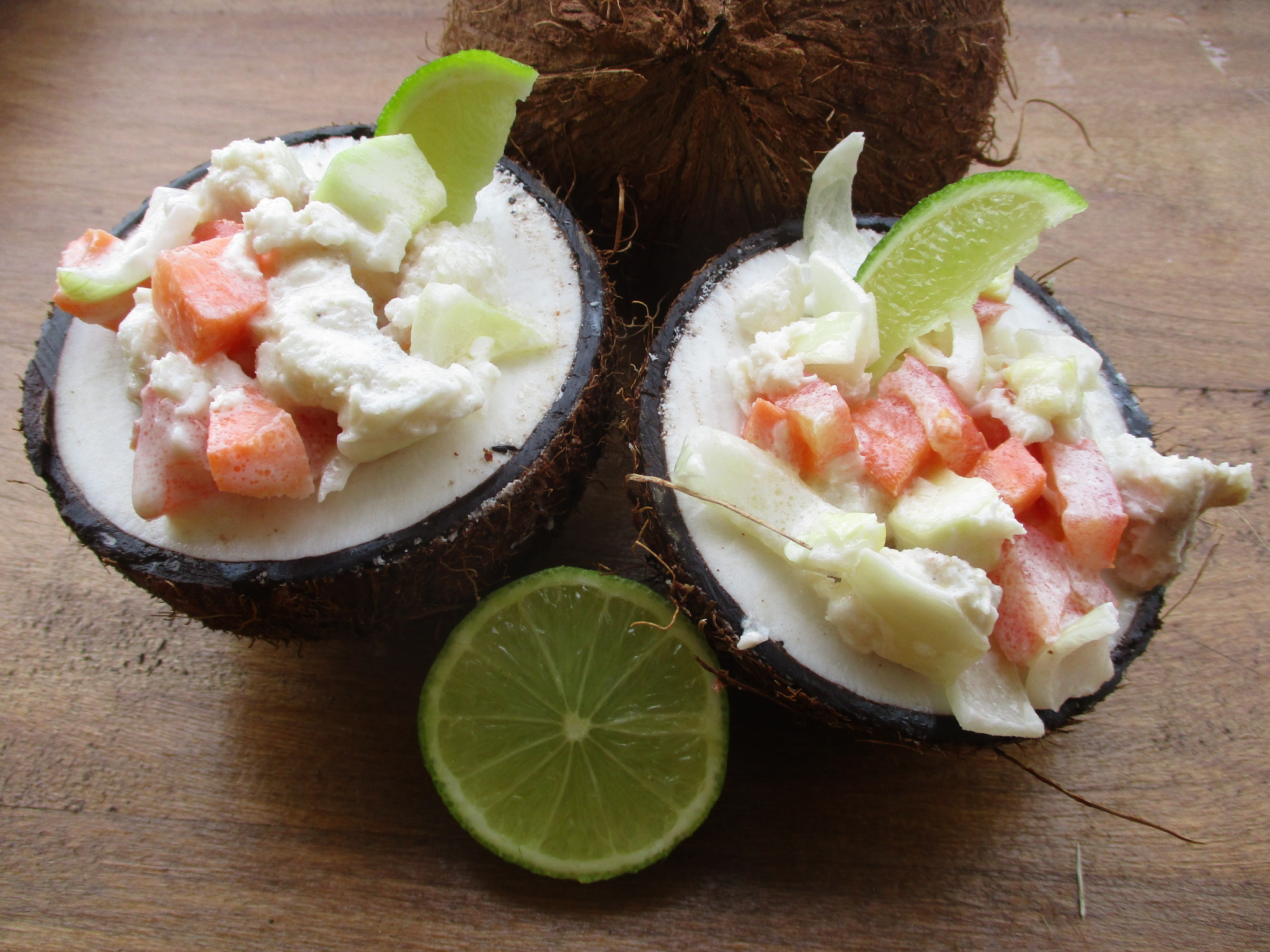
Cook Islands ika mata

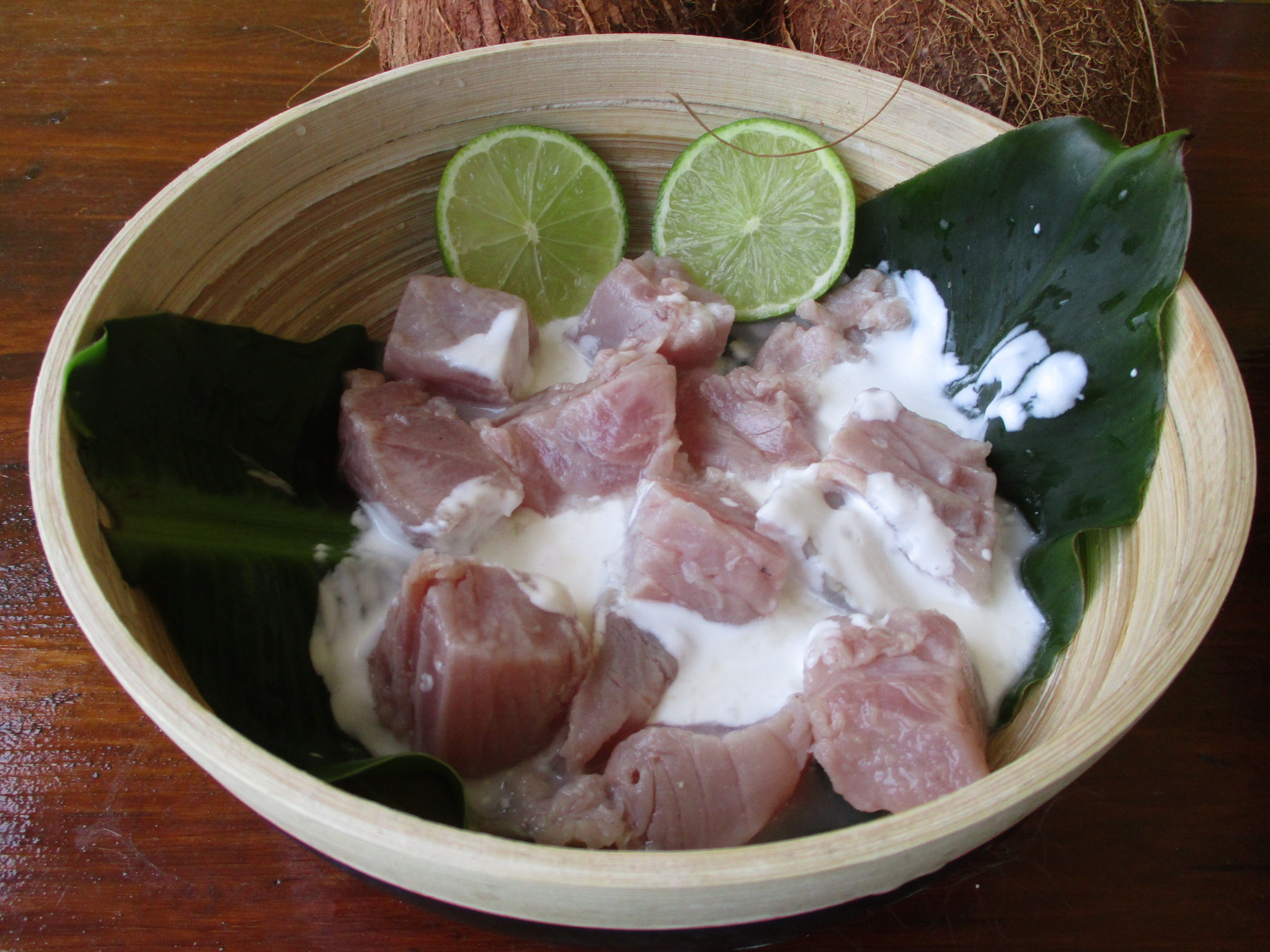
Tuna poisson cru, served on a banana leaf

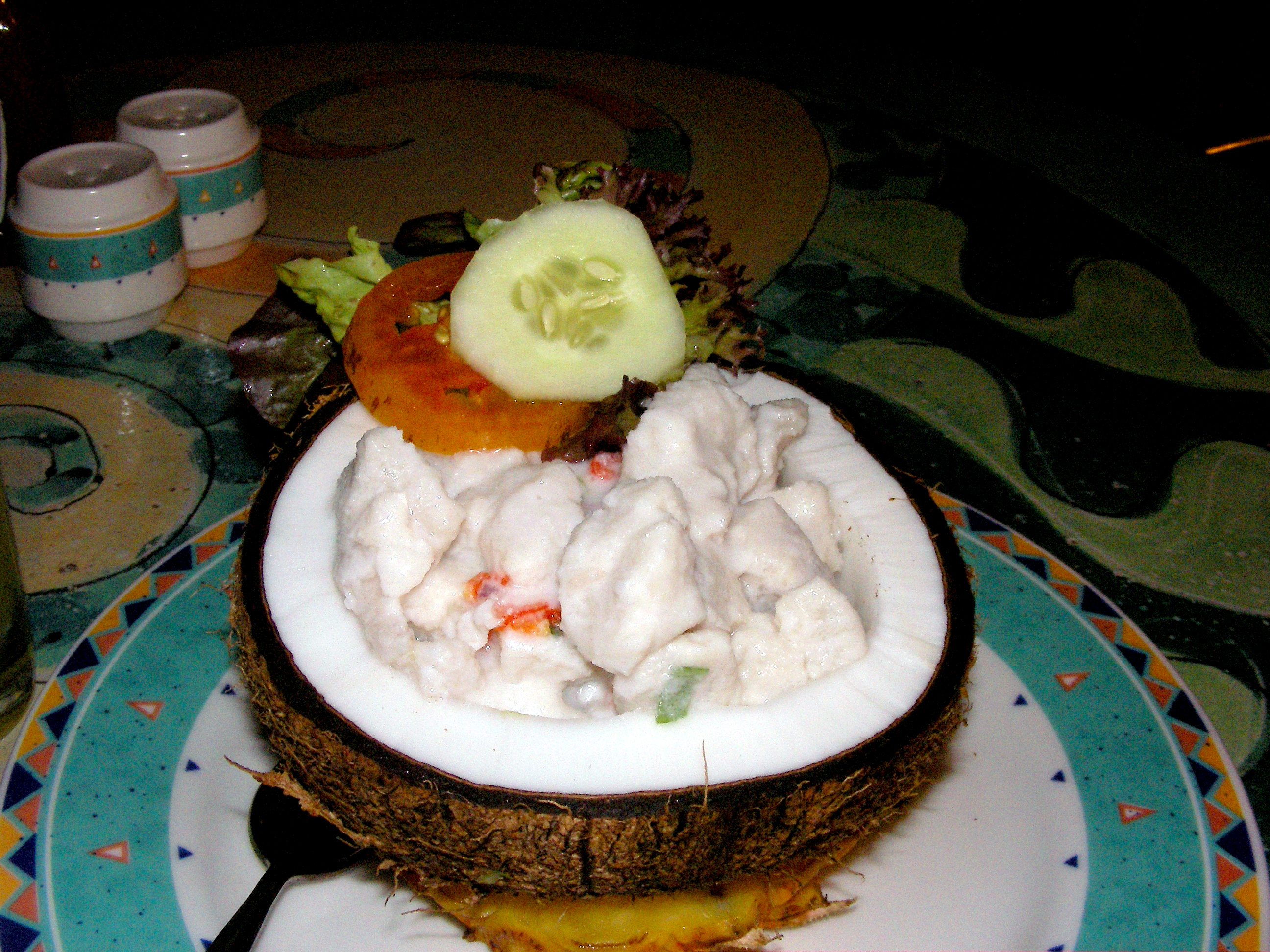
Kokoda in Fiji

== Similar dishes ==
Similar dishes are kinilaw and ata-ata of the Philippines, and kelaguen of the Marianas Islands. Poke and lomi-lomi salmon of Hawaii are also similar. It is also similar to Latin American ceviche.

== See also ==
- Crudo
- Hinava
- Hoe
- Hoe-deopbap
- List of hors d'oeuvre
- List of raw fish dishes
- List of salads
- Tataki
- Singju
- Yusheng
