= Cuchuco =

Staple food in Colombia

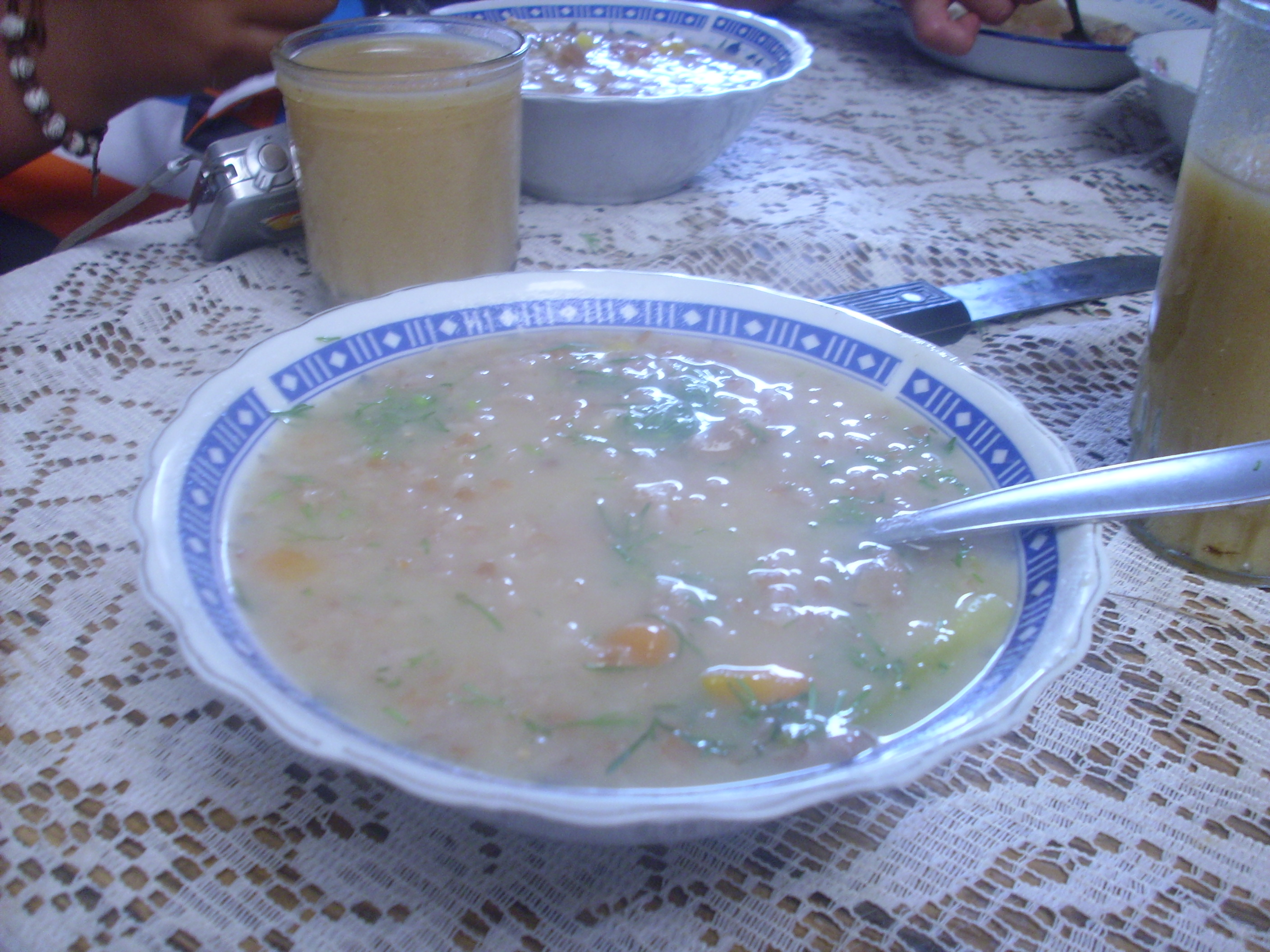
- Cuchuco of wheat from Sogamoso, Colombia.
- Type: Soup
- Course: Lunch, dinner
- Place of origin: Colombia
- Region or state: South America
- Associated cuisine: Colombia
- Created by: Muisca people
- Serving temperature: Hot
- Main ingredients: Corn, barley or wheat and mashed beans

Cuchuco is a soup, part of Native American cuisine of South America associated with the Muisca people, made with corn, barley or wheat and mashed beans, popular in Colombian cuisine, especially Altiplano of the Boyacá and Cundinamarca Departments of Colombia. It is a staple food in Colombia, where it is often made with peas, potatoes, wheat and beans.

An inexpensive food, it is usually eaten with pork, peas, carrot, potatoes, garlic, onion and cilantro. It is popular in Andean region and the plateau cundiboyacense.

== Etymology ==
The word's origin is indigenous from the Chibcha language of the Muisca people. Pedro José Ramírez Sendoya proposes that the word's provenenace is from one of various words used in regional native languages.

== See also ==
- Arepa
- Sancocho
- Tamales
