= Kinilaw =

Filipino seafood dish

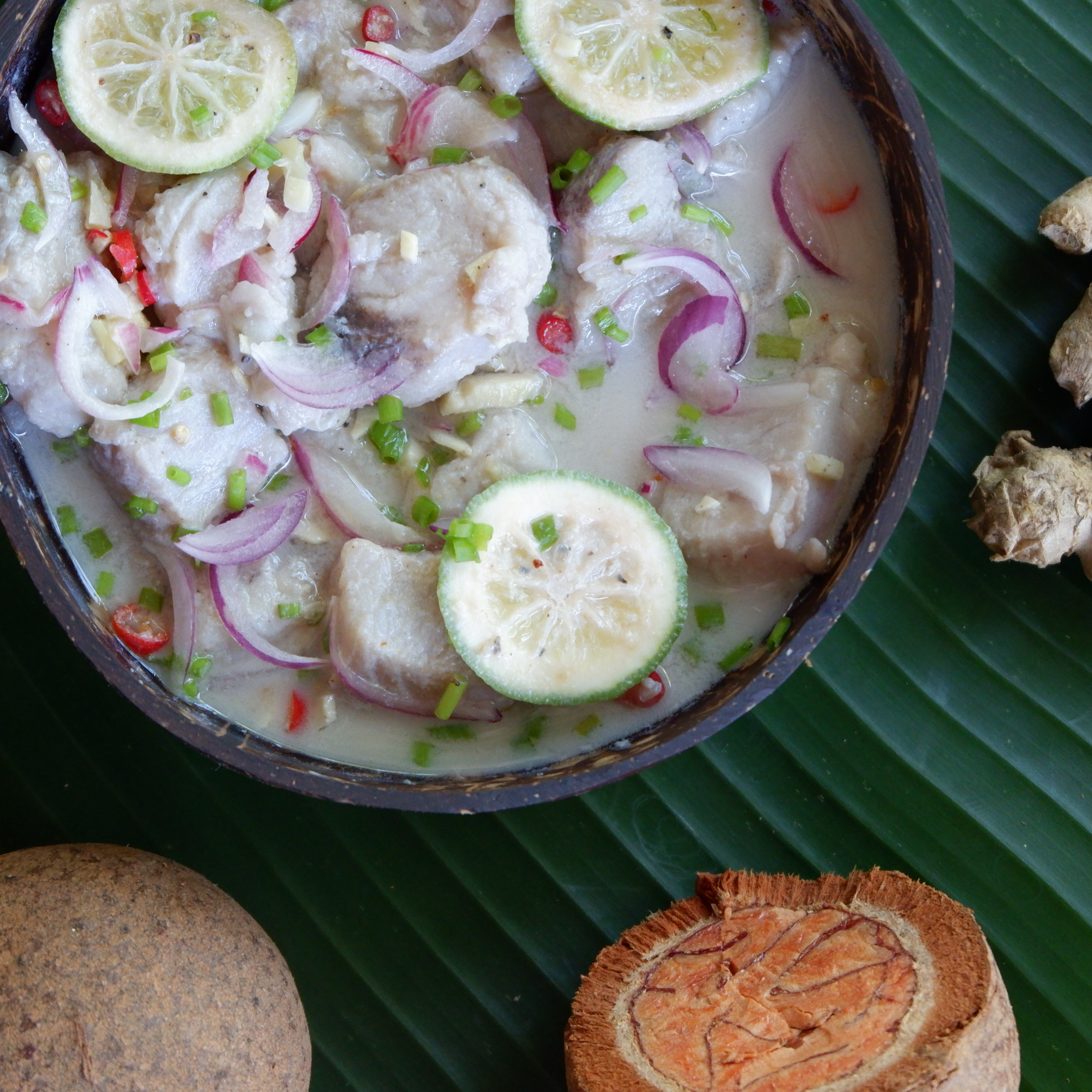
- Kinilaw na tanigue with tabon-tabon and biasong
- Alternative names: kilawin, kilau, kinilau, lataven, binakhaw
- Course: Appetizer
- Place of origin: Philippines
- Serving temperature: Room temperature, cold
- Main ingredients: Seafood/vegetables, vinegar, calamansi (or other sour fruits), onion, ginger, salt, black pepper
- Variations: kilawin, lawal, biyaring
- Similar dishes: Hinava, 'ota 'ika, kelaguen, poke, ceviche

Kinilaw (pronounced [kɪnɪˈlaʊ] or [kɪˈnɪlaʊ], is a Visayan/Cebuano term that means "to eat raw". It is a raw seafood dish and preparation method native to the Philippines. It is more accurately a cooking process that relies on vinegar and acidic fruit juices (usually citrus) to denature the ingredients, rather than a dish, as it can also be used to prepare meat and vegetables. Kinilaw dishes are usually eaten as appetizers before a meal, or as finger food (pulutan) with alcoholic drinks. Kinilaw is also sometimes called kilawin, especially in the northern Philippines, but the term kilawin more commonly applies to a similar lightly grilled meat dish.

== Description ==
The most common kinilaw dish is kinilaw na isda ("fish kinilaw"), prepared using raw cubed fish mixed with vinegar (usually coconut vinegar or cane vinegar) as the primary denaturing agent; along with a souring agent to enhance the tartness like calamansi, dayap (key lime), biasong (also known as suhà), kamias (bilimbi), tamarind, green mangoes, balimbing, and green sineguelas. It is flavored with salt and spices like black pepper, ginger, onions, and chili peppers (commonly the siling labuyo cultivar). An average serving of fish kinilaw contains 147 calories.

To neutralize the fishy taste and acidity before serving, juice extracts from the grated flesh of tabon-tabon, dungon, or young coconuts are also commonly added. Tannin-rich extracts (tungog) from the bark scrapings of bakawan trees (Rhizophora mangroves) or sineguelas are also used similarly. Some regional variants also include gatâ (coconut milk), sugar, or even soft drinks to balance the sourness.

Fish are primarily used, ranging from tanigue or tangigue (Spanish mackerels, king mackerel, or wahoo), malasugi (marlins or swordfish), tambakol, bangus, shark, and anchovies. Other variants include shrimp, squid, clams, oysters, crabs, sea urchin roe, seaweed, jellyfish, shipworms (tamilok), or even beetle larvae.

Seafood must be fresh and properly cleaned, mitigating health hazards involved with consuming raw seafood. Some like squid, however, must be blanched to tenderize the flesh.

=== Ensalada ===
Kinilaw also refers to dishes using raw fruits and vegetables marinated in vinegar and spices, in which case the dishes are sometimes referred to by the Spanish term ensalada ("salad"). Examples include pipino (cucumber), ampalaya (bitter melon), young camote leaves, young papaya, pako (fern), and banana flowers.

== History ==
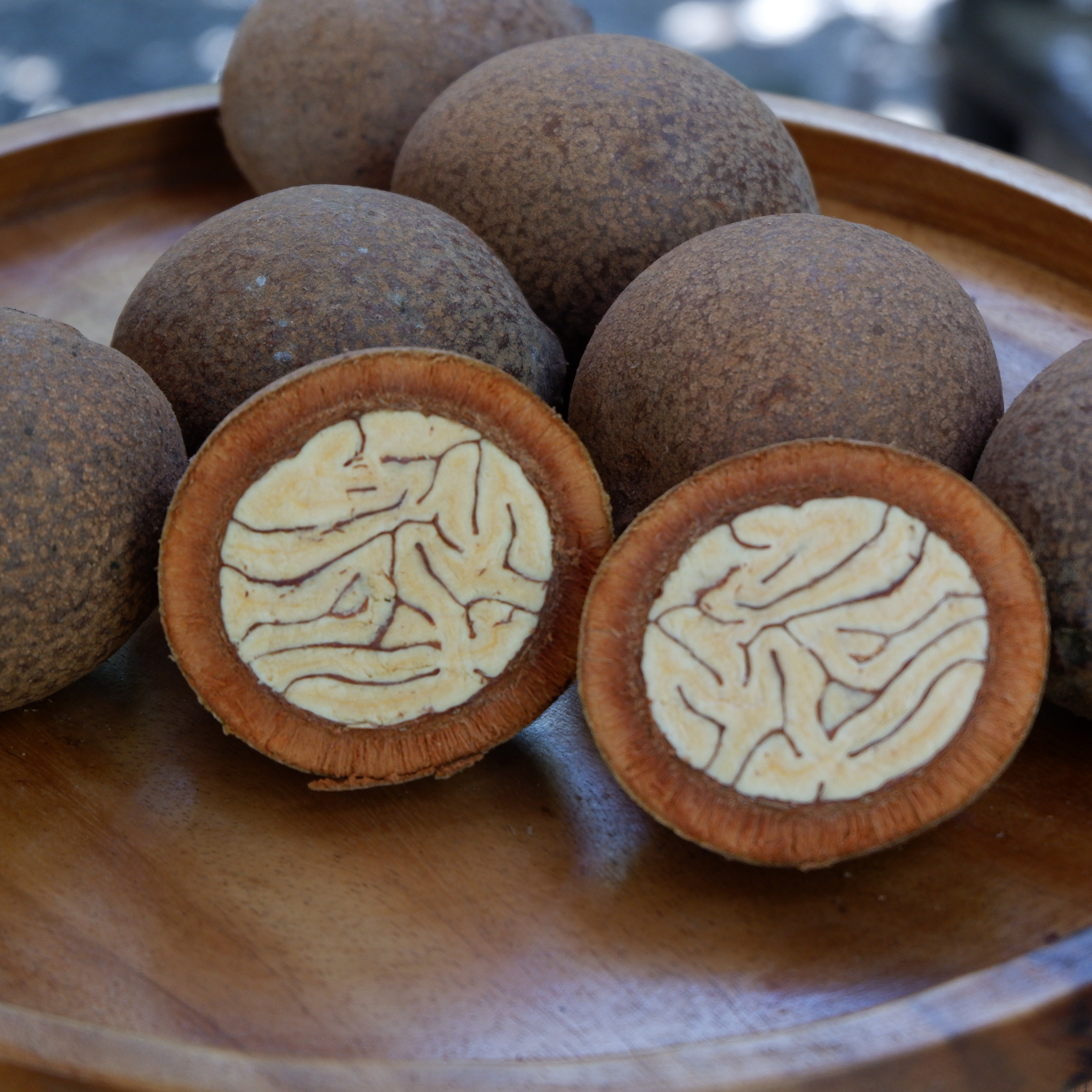
Tabon-tabon fruits

Kinilaw is native to the Philippines. The balangay archaeological excavation site in Butuan (dated c. 10th to 13th century AD) uncovered remains of halved tabon-tabon fruits and fish bones cut in a manner suggesting that they were cubed, thus indicating that the cooking process is at least a thousand years old. It was also described by Spanish colonists and explorers to the Philippines, with the earliest mention being in the Vocabulario de la lengua tagala (1613) as cqinicqilao and cquilao, a Hispanicized spelling of the Visayan verb kilaw ("to eat raw"), and a cognate of the adjective hilaw ("raw", "uncooked", or "unripe"). Other sources that mention it include the Vocabulario de la lengua Pampanga en romance (1732) as quilao; and in the 1754 edition of Vocabulario de la lengua tagala as quilauin.

Unlike Latin American ceviches, which exclusively use citrus juices (which are not native to the Americas), kinilaw instead primarily uses a combination of vinegar and citrus (native to tropical Asia), and other acidic fruit juices.

== Regional names and variants ==
Some of the oldest surviving kinilaw variants are from the southern Visayas and Northern Mindanao, like Cagayan de Oro's kinilaw (sometimes stylized as kinilaw de Oro) and Dumaguete's binakhaw. Both are direct descendants of ancient Visayan preparation methods as displayed in the Butuan archeological finds. These are the original versions that use tabon-tabon and dungon fruits respectively.

Several regions of the Philippines have local specialties or names of kinilaw dishes. In Northern Luzon, particularly among the Ilocano people, kinilaw is commonly referred to as kilawin or kilawen. Among Ilocanos, however, the term kilawen is understood as a method of food preparation that encompasses a variety of raw, lightly cooked, or cured dishes, including those traditionally classified as kinilaw. These dishes are typically prepared using raw, lightly grilled, or boiled meat or seafood, marinated in sugarcane vinegar (sukang Iloko) or citrus juices such as calamansi or dayap. The most commonly used ingredients include fish, shrimp, carabao, beef, goat, and pork, which are seasoned with ginger, chili, salt, and other spices to enhance their flavor. Notable examples of kilawin or kilawen dishes include Kilawen nga Ipon (baby anchovies or small fish), Jumping Salad (live shrimp), Kilawen a Kalding (grilled goat meat), Insarabasab (a dish similar to dinakdakan but without pig brain), Ata-ata or Kappukan (rare beef or carabao meat) and Kudil or Caliente (boiled carabao or cow skin). These dishes are integral to Ilocano cuisine and are highly regarded for their tangy and robust flavors. Among the Ivatan people of the Batanes islands refer to kinilaw as lataven. Fish lataven is known as lataven a among (also spelled lataven a amung).

In the southern Philippines, the Tausug people of the Sulu islands refer to fish kinilaw as lawal. Unlike other kinilaw dishes, lawal uses vinegar only to wash the fish, and uses citrus fruits and other souring agents to denature the fish meat. Among the Sama-Bajau people, it is known as kilau or kinilau and sometimes includes unripe mangoes as a souring agent. Among the Maranao people of southwestern Mindanao, biyaring is a type of kinilaw made with tiny shrimp. It is a regional favorite and is notable because it is ideally prepared while the shrimp are still alive.

A common way of serving kinilaw in the islands of Visayas and Mindanao is sinuglaw, which combines fish kinilaw (usually tuna) and charcoal-grilled pork belly (sinugba).

== Gallery ==
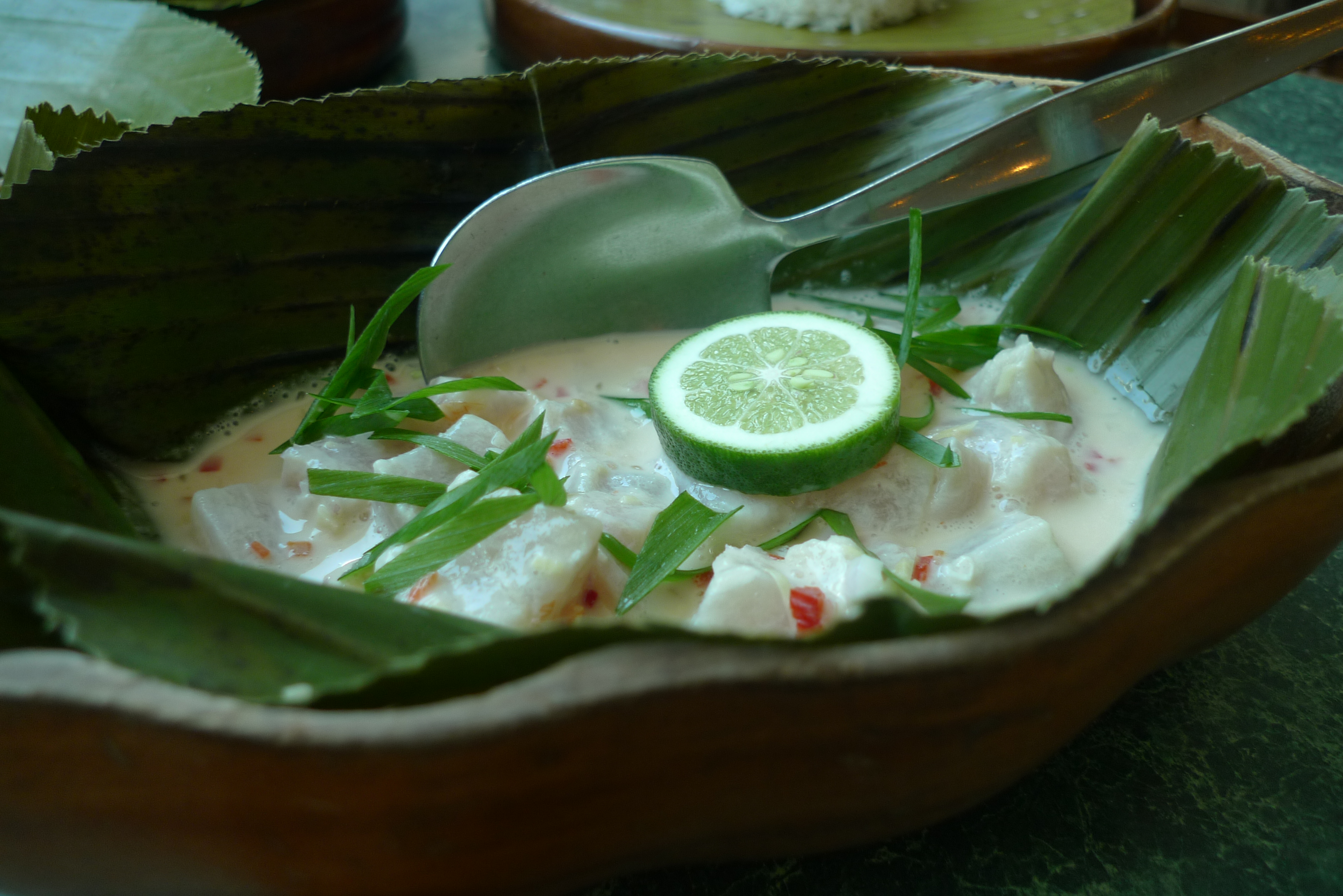
Traditional fish kinilaw from Cagayan de Oro

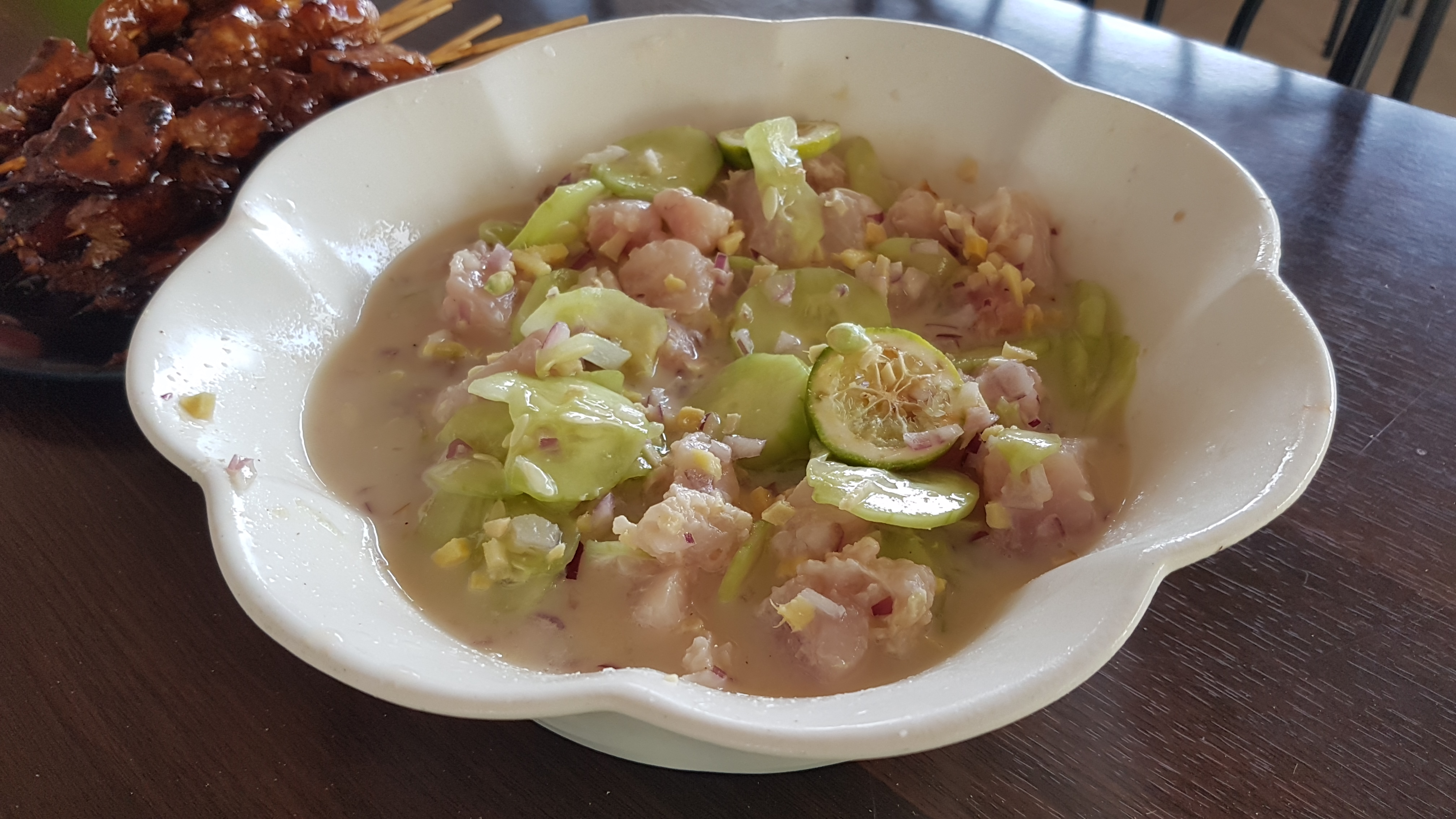
Kinilaw na malasugi
(marlin)

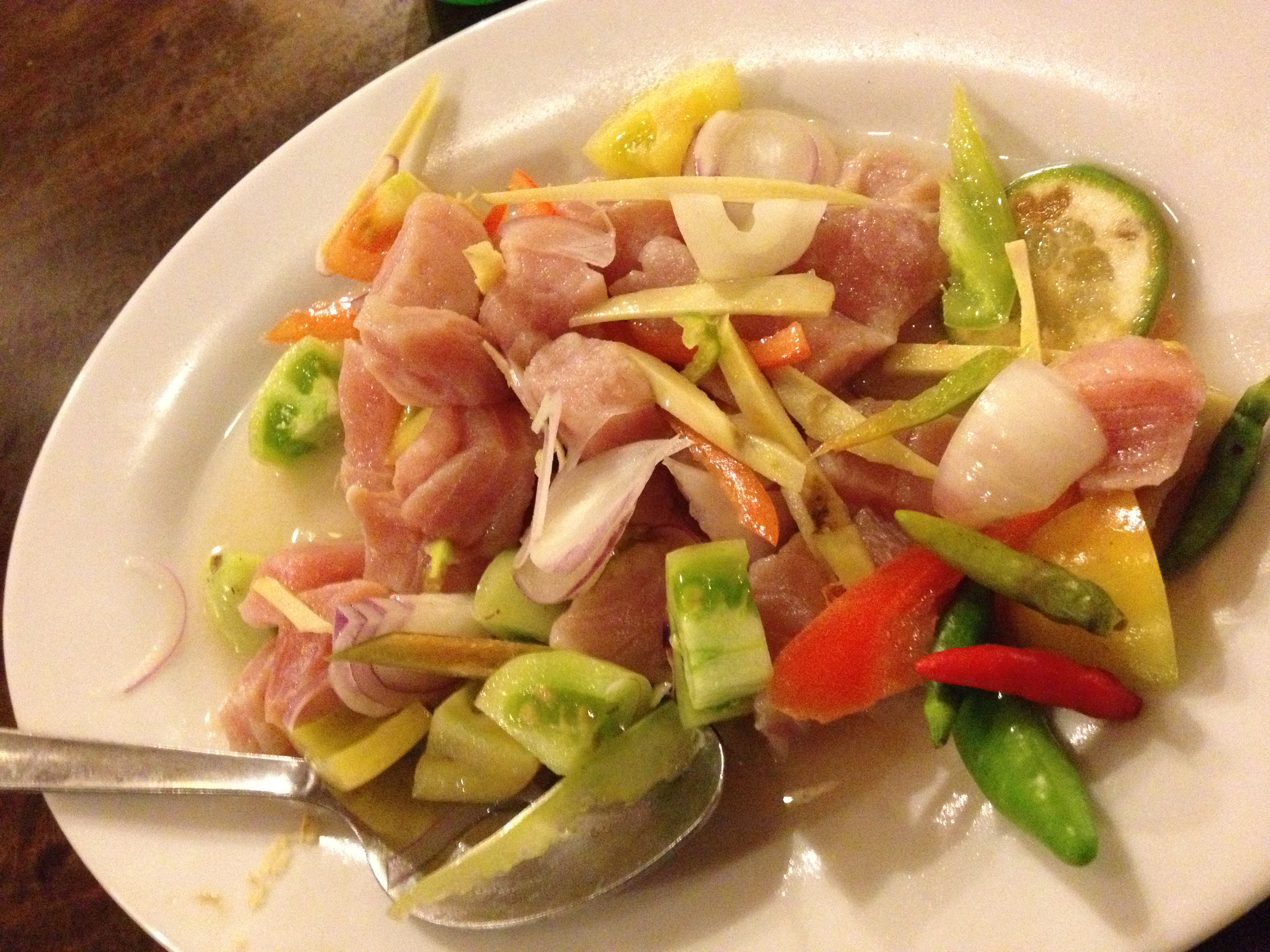
Kinilaw na malasugi
(marlin)

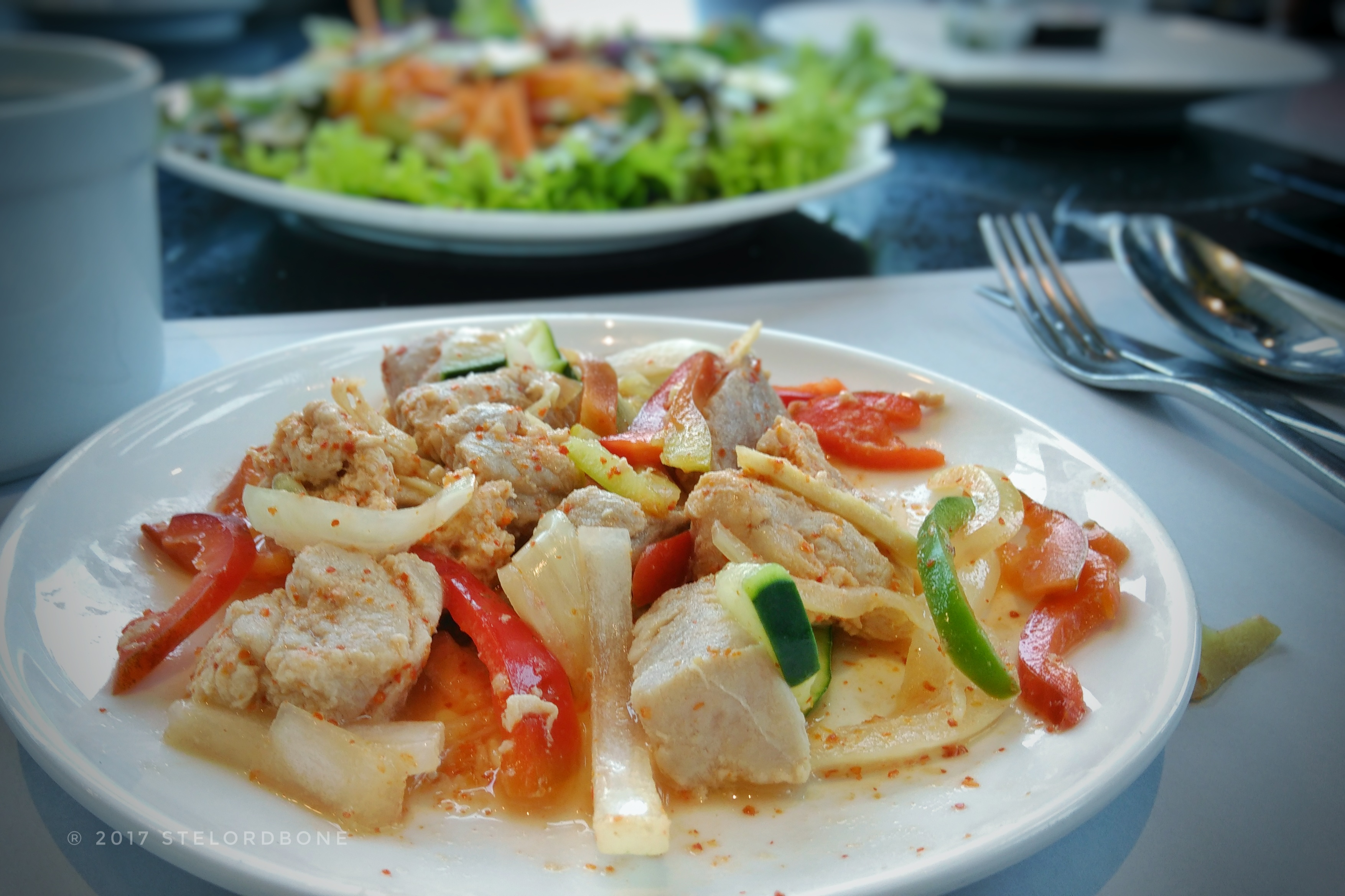
Fish kinilaw with chili flakes

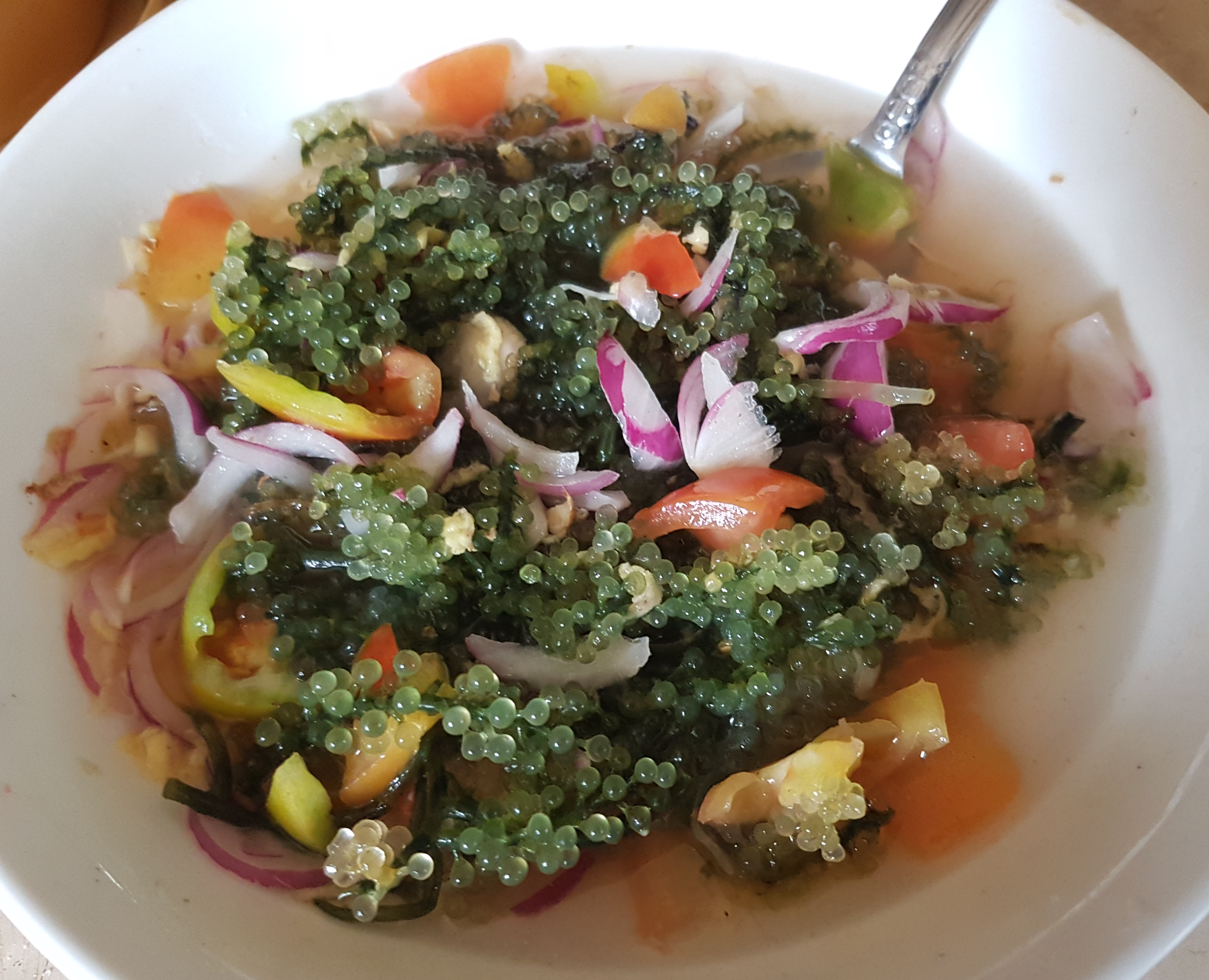
Kinilaw na latô
(sea grapes)

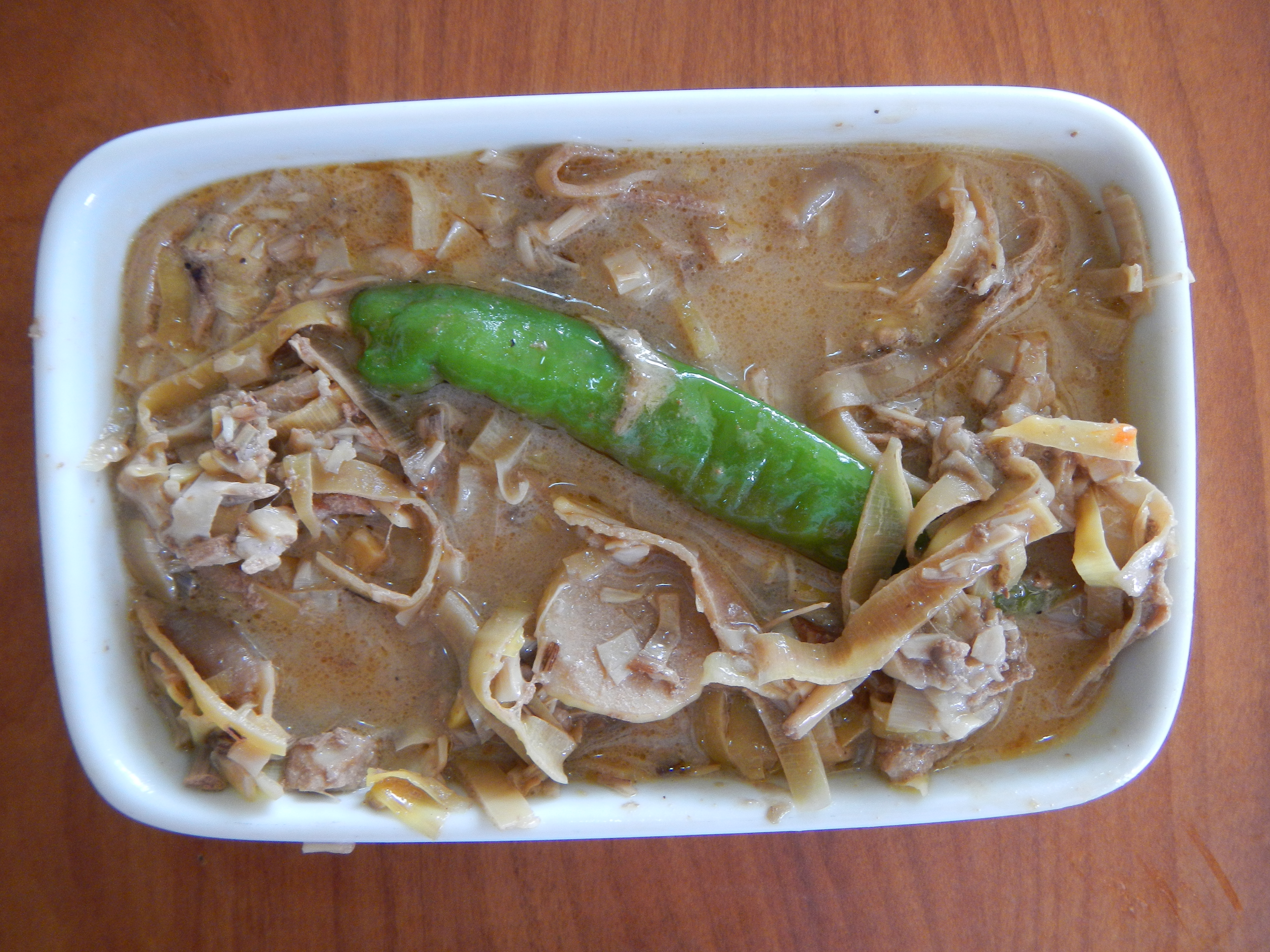
Kilawin na pusô ng saging
(banana flowers)

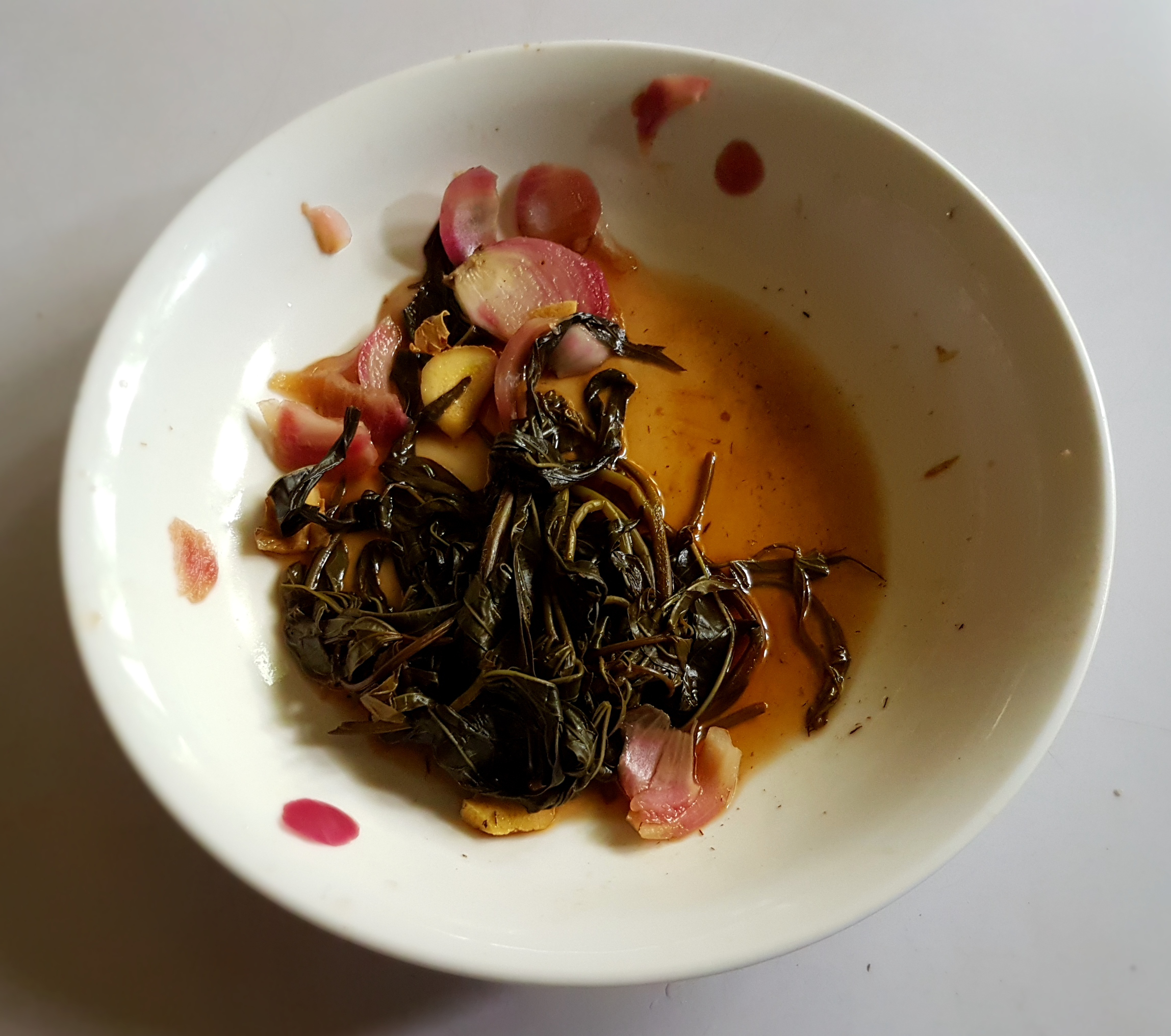
Kinilaw nga galay sa camote
(camote leaves)

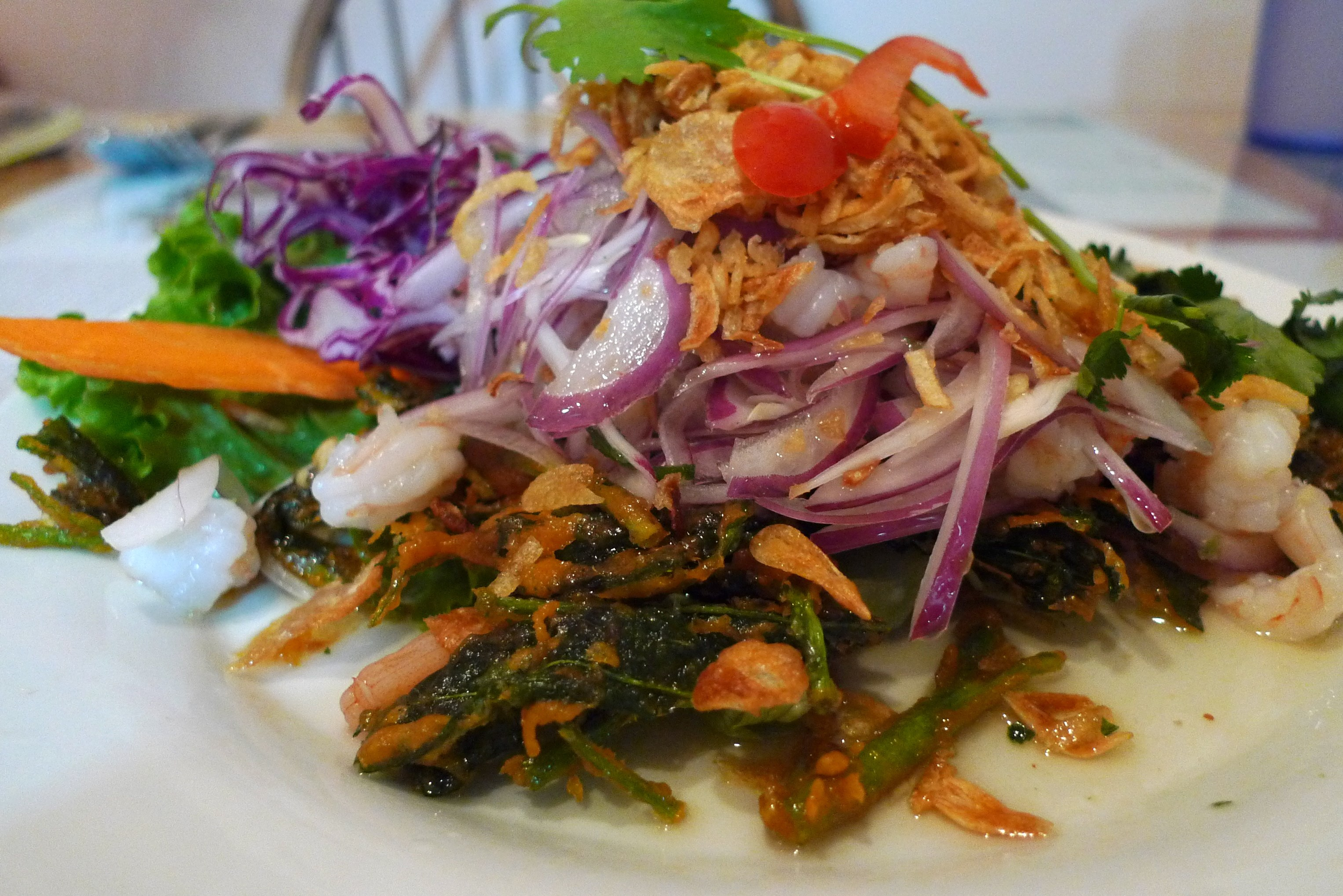
Ensaladang kangkong
(water spinach)

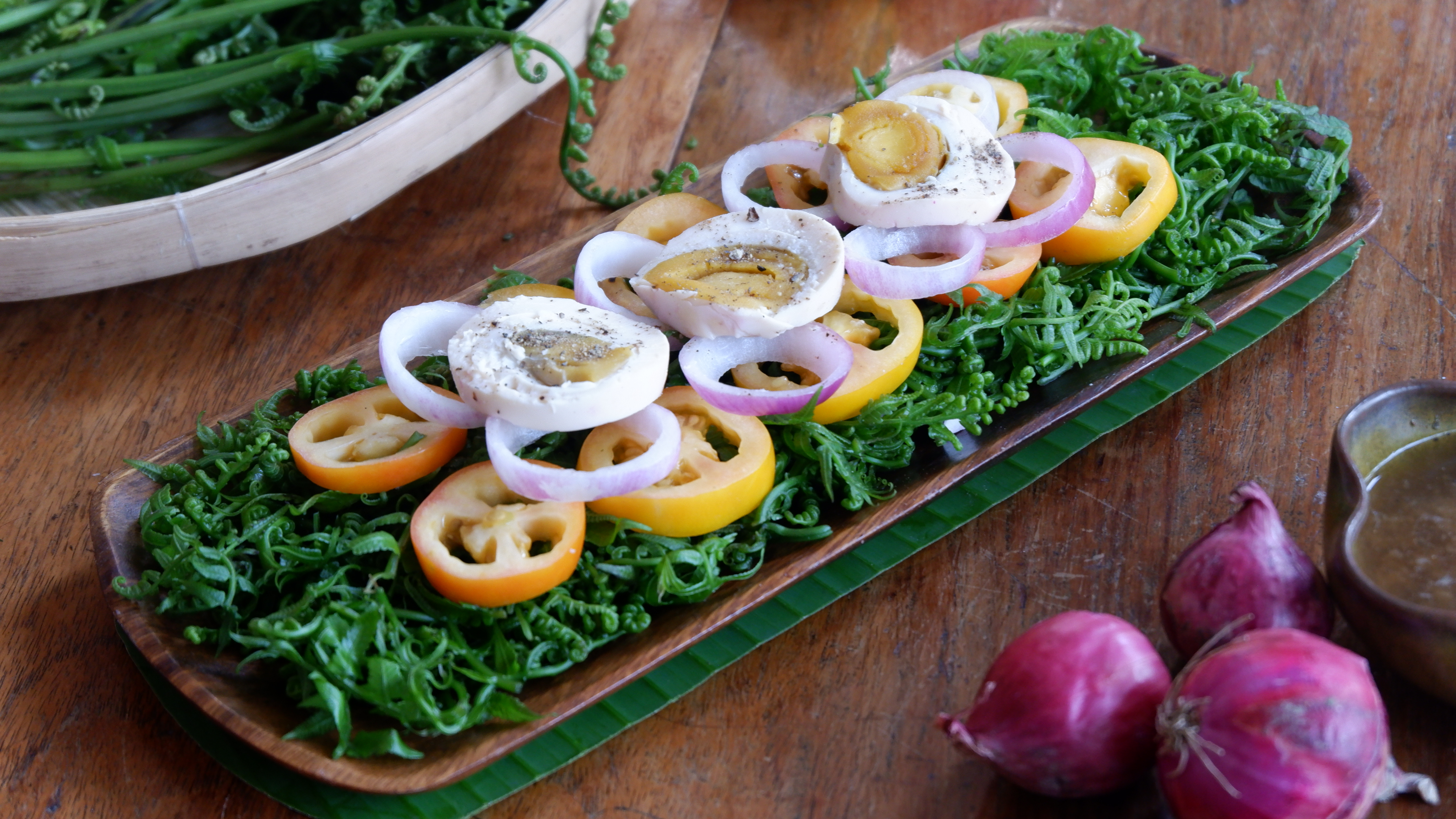
Ensaladang pako
(vegetable fern)

== See also ==
- Kilawin - related dish from northern Luzon that uses blanched and grilled meat
  - Kelaguen - Chamorro dish derived from kilawin
- Hinava - related Malaysian dish in Sabah
- Umai - related Malaysian dish in Sarawak
- Gohu ikan - related Indonesian dish in Maluku
- 'Ota 'ika - similar Polynesian dish
- Poke - similar Hawaiian dish
- Ceviche - similar Latin American dish
- List of raw fish dishes
