= Ceviche =

Dish of marinated raw seafood

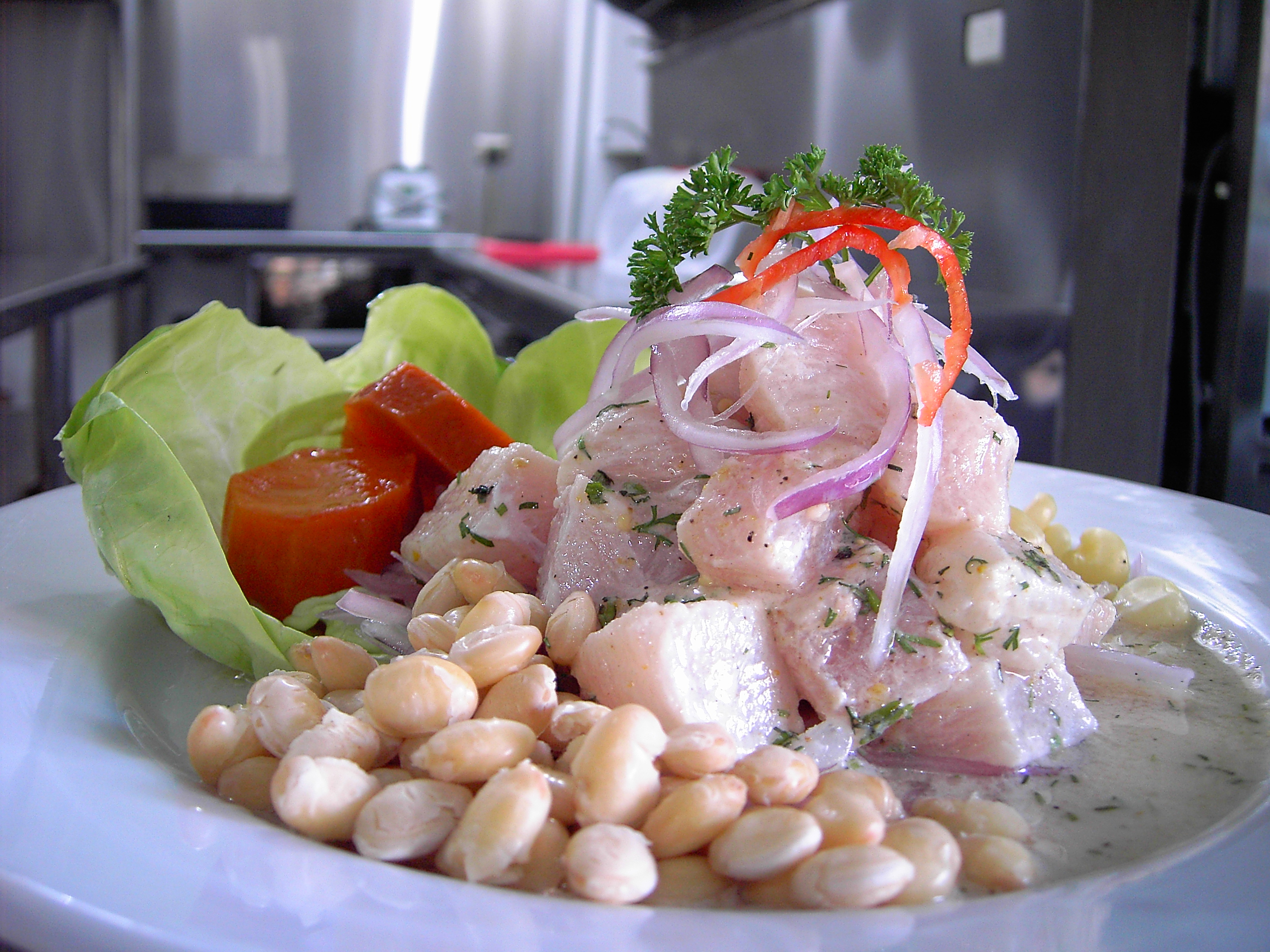
- Peruvian ceviche
- Course: Main course, appetizer
- Place of origin: Disputed
- Region or state: Latin American countries along the Pacific coast
- Serving temperature: Cold; cured with lemon, lime juice
- Main ingredients: Fish, lime, lemon, onion, chili pepper, cilantro
- Similar dishes: Kelaguen, 'Ota 'ika, Kinilaw, Kilawin, Hinava, Poke, Naniura, gohu (Indonesian dish)

Cultural Heritage of Peru
- Official name: Seviche: comida tradicional del Perú
- Type: Intangible
- Criteria: Knowledge, skills and practices associated with traditional medicine and gastronomy, among others
- Designated: 26 March 2004; 22 years ago
- Legal basis: RDN 241/INC-2004

Practices and meanings associated with the preparation and consumption of ceviche, an expression of Peruvian traditional cuisine
- UNESCO Intangible Cultural Heritage
- Country: Peru
- Reference: 01952
- Region: Latin America and the Caribbean

Inscription history
- Inscription: 2023 (18th session)
- List: Representative

Ceviche, cebiche, sebiche, or seviche (Note: All four spellings are included in the Dictionary of the Spanish language; each one is used in a different geographical area. All are pronounced [seˈβitʃe] in Latin American Spanish.) is a traditional cold dish consisting of raw fish or shellfish marinated in citrus and seasonings. Different versions of ceviche are part of the culinary cultures of various Latin American countries along the Pacific Ocean where each iteration is considered native, including Chile, Colombia, Costa Rica, Ecuador, El Salvador, Guatemala, Honduras, Mexico, Puerto Rico, Nicaragua, Panama, and Peru. Most notably, ceviche is considered the national dish of Peru and is recognized by UNESCO as an expression of Peruvian traditional cuisine and an Intangible Cultural Heritage of Humanity.

Unlike Japanese sashimi, which is served completely unaltered, the seafood in ceviche is marinated in fresh citrus juice—typically lemon or lime. The citric acid denatures the protein molecules in the fish, altering their structure, causing the flesh to turn opaque and firm. While this process mimics the look and texture of heat-cooked fish, the seafood remains structurally raw, as acid marination does not preserve the fish or kill pathogens the way true heat-cooking or curing does. While the fish is typically marinated in lemon or sour lime juice in contemporary preparation, ancient Andean coastal inhabitants used juices from native plants like the banana passionfruit (known locally as tumbo) before the introduction of citrus fruits to the Andean region during 16th century. The dressing also includes some local variety of chili pepper or chili, replaced by mustard in some parts of Central America. The marinade usually also includes sliced or chopped onions and chopped cilantro, though in some regions such as Mexico, tomatoes, avocadoes, and tomato sauce may be included.

Ceviche is often eaten as an appetizer; when eaten as a main dish, it is usually accompanied by starchy side dishes that are designed to balance its acidity, such as sweet potato, lettuce, maize, avocado, or fried plantains, among various other accompaniments.

== Etymology ==
The first documented evidence of the term ceviche is from 1820, in the patriotic song "La Chicha," considered the first Peruvian national anthem.

According to the Royal Spanish Academy, the word might have the same etymology as the Spanish term escabeche, which derives from Mozarabic izkebêch, in turn descending from Andalusian Arabic assukkabáǧ, which also derives from Classical Arabic sakbāj (سكباج, meaning meat cooked in vinegar). It is ultimately from the unattested Middle Persian *sikbāg, from sik ("vinegar") and *bāg ("soup"), which also yielded the Persian word sekbā (سکبا, a soup made with meat and vinegar). Another hypothesis is that it derives from the Quechua word siwichi, meaning fresh fish.

The name of the dish is spelled variously as cebiche, ceviche, seviche, or sebiche, but the most common spelling is ceviche with v, such as in Peru, which is an alternative spelling accepted by the Royal Spanish Academy. There are also other local variants of the name, including cerbiche and serviche.

== History ==
=== Proto-Ceviche ===
Before the arrival of Europeans, the ancient civilizations along the Pacific coast of South America practiced a form of "Proto-Ceviche". The term "Proto-Ceviche" refers to the historical predecessor of the modern version of the dish. These early versions of the dish relied on varying types of local acids and preservatives that were used long before the introduction of limes to the Andean region. Various explanations of the dish's origins exist, with Peruvian researchers and archaeological evidence strongly favoring a pre-Hispanic origin within coastal civilizations. According to some historic sources from Peru, the Caral civilization that developed in central Peru between 3500 BC to 1800 BC has left evidence of the use and consumption of raw Peruvian anchovy with chili and sea salt, according to the investigations of archaeologist Ruth Shady. Another theory is that ceviche originated among the Moche, a coastal civilization that began to flourish in present-day northern Peru nearly 2,000 years ago. The Moche used the fermented juice from the local banana passionfruit (known locally as tumbo) instead of lime or lemon juice which had not been introduced to the region until colonial times. Recent investigations further show that during the Inca Empire, fish was marinated with chicha, an Andean fermented corn beer. Different chronicles also report that along the Incan coast before the arrival of Spaniards, fish was consumed with sea salt and ají (South American chili peppers). Historical chronicles note that this type of "Proto-Ceviche" was a staple along the Incan Coast, highlighting a long standing tradition of consuming "acid-cooked" fish.

Its origin is also often attributed to places ranging from Central America to Polynesia. In Ecuador, it may have had its origins in coastal civilizations, as Ecuador shares geographic and cultural heritages (such as the Inca Empire) and a wide variety of fish and shellfish that are also native to Peru. The Ecuadorian position traces the origin of ceviche to the harvest of the Spondylus shell in the years 3500 BC to 1500 BC in the Valdivia culture, whose diet used marine products that were later used in ceviche. The Spanish, who brought citrus fruits such as the lime from Europe, may have originated the dish in Spain with roots in Moorish cuisine. Peruvian historian Juan José Vega supports the theory put forward by Fernando Rueda García, historian of Málaga and a member of the Andalusian Ethnology Commission, who suggests that it was Moorish slaves who created ceviche by mixing local and foreign ingredients that were arriving on the Iberian Peninsula. However, archeological records and many researchers support pre-Hispanic origins, which suggest that foods resembling ceviche may have been indigenous to western South America as early as 2,000 years ago.

=== Colonial and modern ceviche ===
The modern style of ceviche is a direct result of a culinary fusion that occurred during the Spanish colonial era in the 16th century. This period saw the combination of New World ingredients with Old World cooking techniques. Historians concur that the modern iteration of ceviche originated during colonial times in present-day Peru, specifically through the introduction of limes, onions, and vinegar. The technique of macerating (softening or breaking down a food by leaving it in liquid, in this case citrus) raw fish and meat in vinegar, citrus, and spices (escabeche) was brought to the Americas from Spain and is linked to the Moorish (Muslim) heritage in Spanish cuisine. During the 20th century, Japanese immigrants in Peru adapted ceviche by shortening the amount of time the raw fish was marinated in citrus; this version of the dish proved popular both in Peru and abroad.

== Preparation and variants ==
Ceviche is marinated in a citrus-based mixture, with lemons and limes most commonly used. In addition to adding flavor, the citric acid causes the proteins in the seafood to become denatured, resulting in the dish appearing to be cooked without the application of heat. Because the dish is eaten raw and not cooked with heat, it must be prepared fresh and consumed immediately to minimize the risk of food poisoning. Acid marinades will not kill bacteria or parasitic worms, unlike the heat of cooking. Traditional-style ceviche was marinated for about three hours. Modern-style ceviche, popularized in the 1970s, usually has a very short marinating period. The appropriate fish can marinate in the time it takes to mix the ingredients, serve, and carry the ceviche to the table.

Accompaniments to ceviche vary greatly by region: in Ecuador, ceviche is served with fried plantains, popcorn, or tostones; in Colombia, Panama, and Guatemala, it is served with saltine crackers, though in the north cookies or toast are used as a garnish; in Mexico, it is served with corn tostadas or crackers; in Panama, the spicy chombo chili pepper is sometimes added to taste; and in Peru, it is served with boiled root vegetables (such as sweet potatoes, cassava, or rarely potatoes), grains or seeds such as boiled or roasted corn, legumes, fried plantains, seaweed, or lettuce; sometimes it can also be accompanied by chilcano (broth made from fish heads).

Most Latin American countries have given ceviche its own touch of individuality by adding their own particular garnishes.

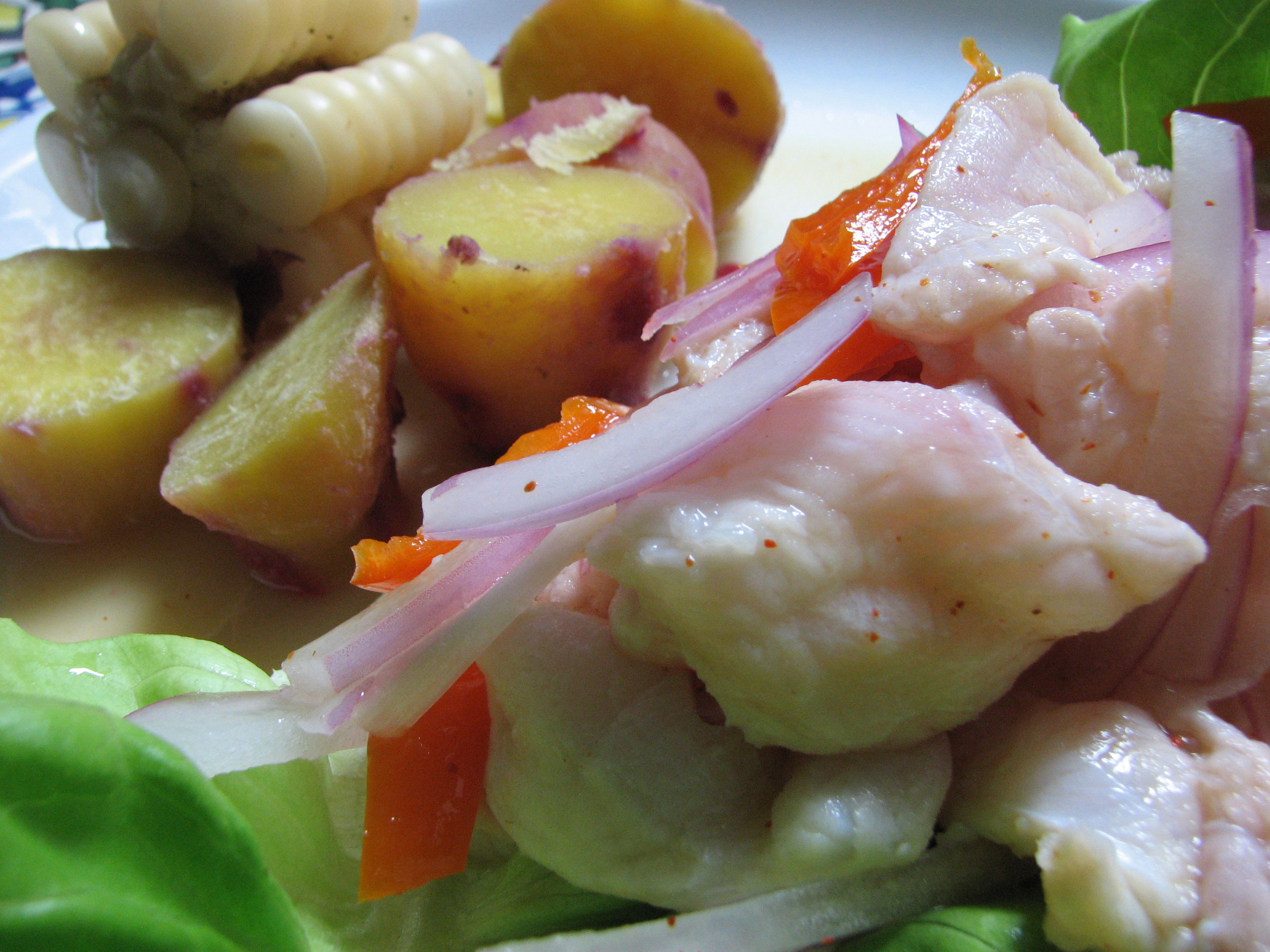
Peruvian ceviche

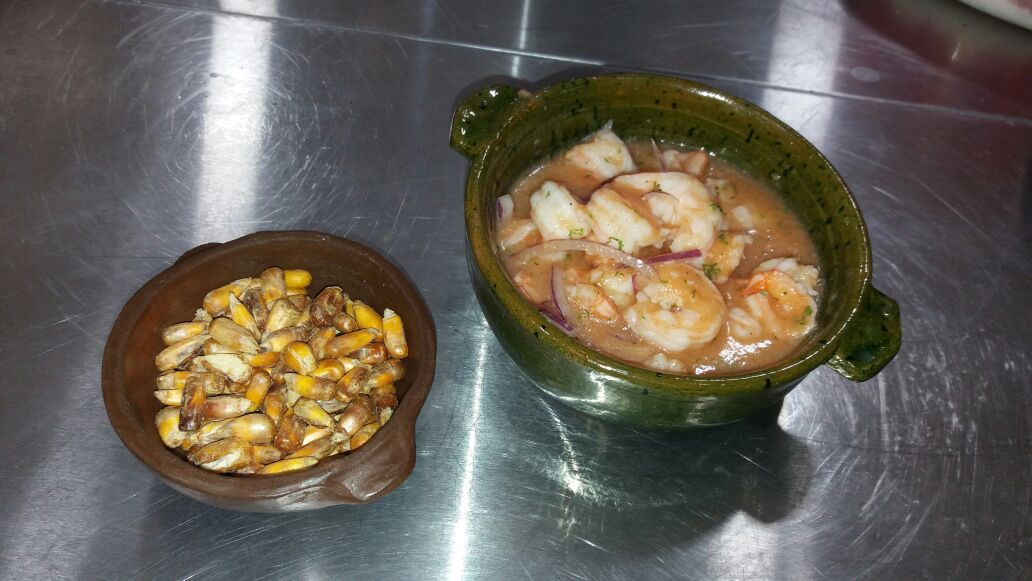
Ecuadorian ceviche

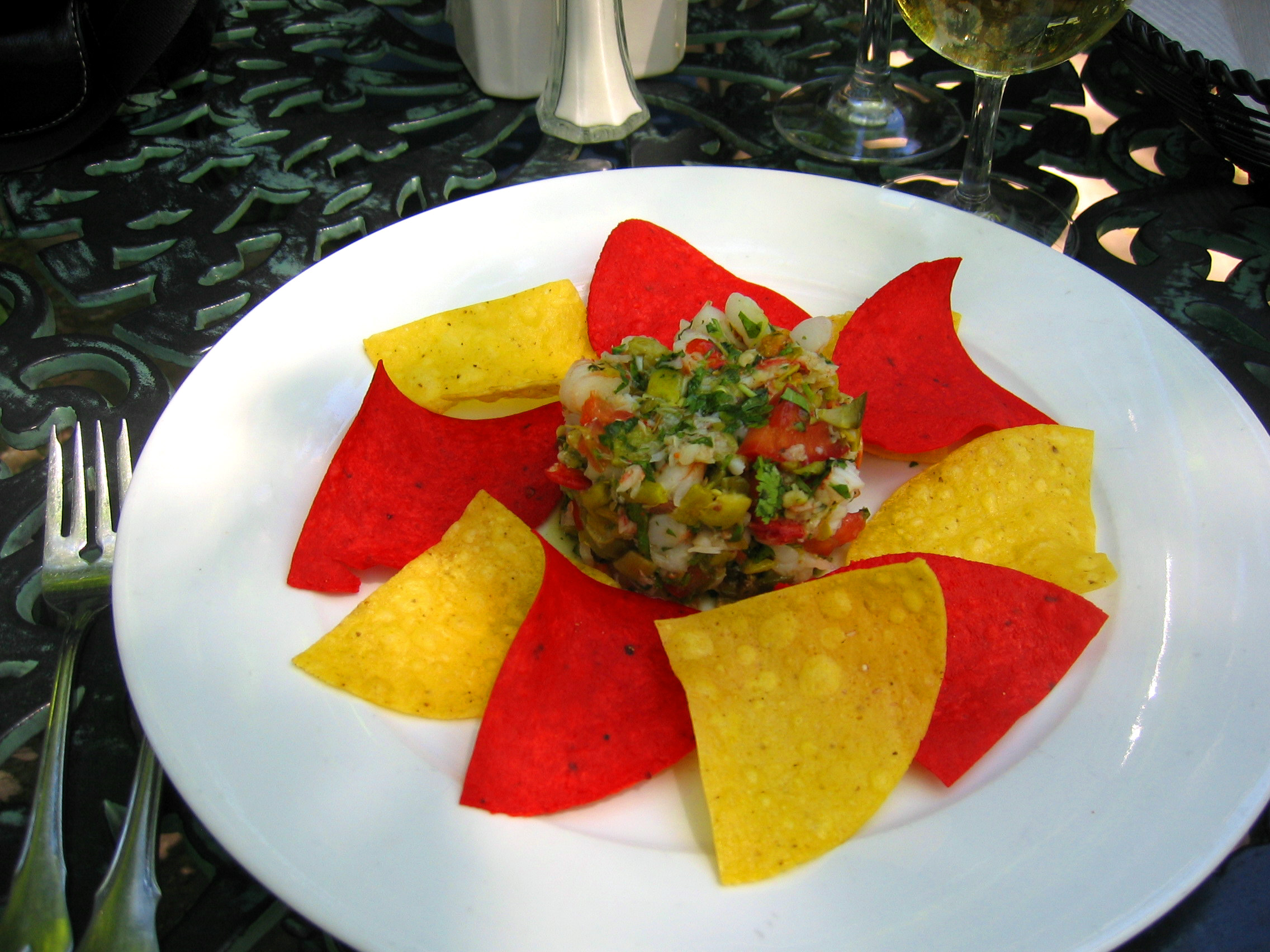
Mexican ceviche

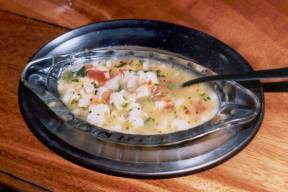
Ceviche from Costa Rica

=== South America ===
In Peru, ceviche has been declared part of the country's national heritage and has even had a holiday declared in its honor. The classic Peruvian ceviche is composed of chunks of raw fish, marinated in freshly squeezed key lime, with sliced onions, chili peppers, salt and pepper. Corvina or cebo (sea bass) was the fish traditionally used. The mixture was traditionally marinated for several hours and served at room temperature, with chunks of corn on the cob and slices of cooked sweet potato. Earlier preparation methods likely involved longer curing times, closer to pickling, before the adoption of citrus introduced after Spanish contact. Regional or contemporary variations include garlic, fish bone broth, minced Peruvian ají limo, or the Andean chili rocoto, toasted corn or cancha and yuyo (seaweed). A specialty of Trujillo is ceviche prepared from shark (tollo or tojo). Lenguado (sole) is often used in Lima. The modern version of Peruvian ceviche, similar to the method used in making Japanese sashimi, consists of fish marinated for a few minutes and served promptly. It was developed in the 1970s by Peruvian-Japanese chefs, including Dario Matsufuji and Humberto Sato. Many Peruvian cevicherías serve a small glass of the marinade, which is called leche de tigre or leche de pantera, as an appetizer along with the fish.

According to an Inter-American Development Bank (IDB) study of innovation in Peruvian cuisine and its connection with Peruvian cultural diversity (2022), the great variety of ceviches offered by Peruvian marine cuisine is an example of the gastronomic impact of cultural diversity throughout its territory, in which fishers, farmers, and chefs come together. In his 2015 book Ceviche Power, Gaston Acurio documents the different nuances through a tour of the ceviche route through Tumbes, Piura, Lambayeque, La Libertad, Ancash, the Lima coast, Lima, Ica, Arequipa, Moquegua and Tacna. This great diversity has motivated chefs to create new types of ceviches.

In Ecuador, the classic ceviche is made up of pieces of fish pickled in lemon juice and cooked or shrimp cooked using the tomato juice or water along with the shrimp shells, with sliced red onions, sliced tomatoes, salt, pepper, cilantro, and oil. The mixture is traditionally marinated for several hours and served with a bowl of toasted corn kernels as a side dish; fried green plantain chunks called "patacones", or thinly sliced plantain chips called chifles. In some regions, ceviche is served with rice on the side. Ceviches in Ecuador are seasoned with tomato sauce, mustard, and oil. The Manabí style, made with lemon juice, salt, and the juice provided by the cooked shrimp itself, and sometimes topped with peanut butter, is very popular. Occasionally, ceviche is made with various types of local shellfish, such as black clam (cooked or raw), oysters (cooked or raw), spondylus (raw), barnacles (cooked percebes), among others mostly cooked. Well-cooked sea bass (corvina) or bicuda (picudo), octopus, and crab ceviches are also common in Ecuador. In all ceviches, red onion, lemon juice, cilantro, salt, and oil are ubiquitous ingredients.

In Chile, ceviche is often made with fillets of halibut or Patagonian toothfish and marinated in lime and grapefruit juices; finely minced garlic and red chili peppers and often fresh mint and cilantro are added. On Easter Island, the preferred fish is tuna, marinated in lemon juice and coconut milk.

In Colombia, cebiches or shrimp cocktails, oysters, crabs, squid, chipi chipi, among others, and combinations of them are prepared. The sauce includes tomato sauce, mayonnaise, garlic sauce, cilantro, chopped white onion, lemon juice, among other seasonings. They are accompanied with salty soda cracker.

=== North and Central America and the Caribbean ===
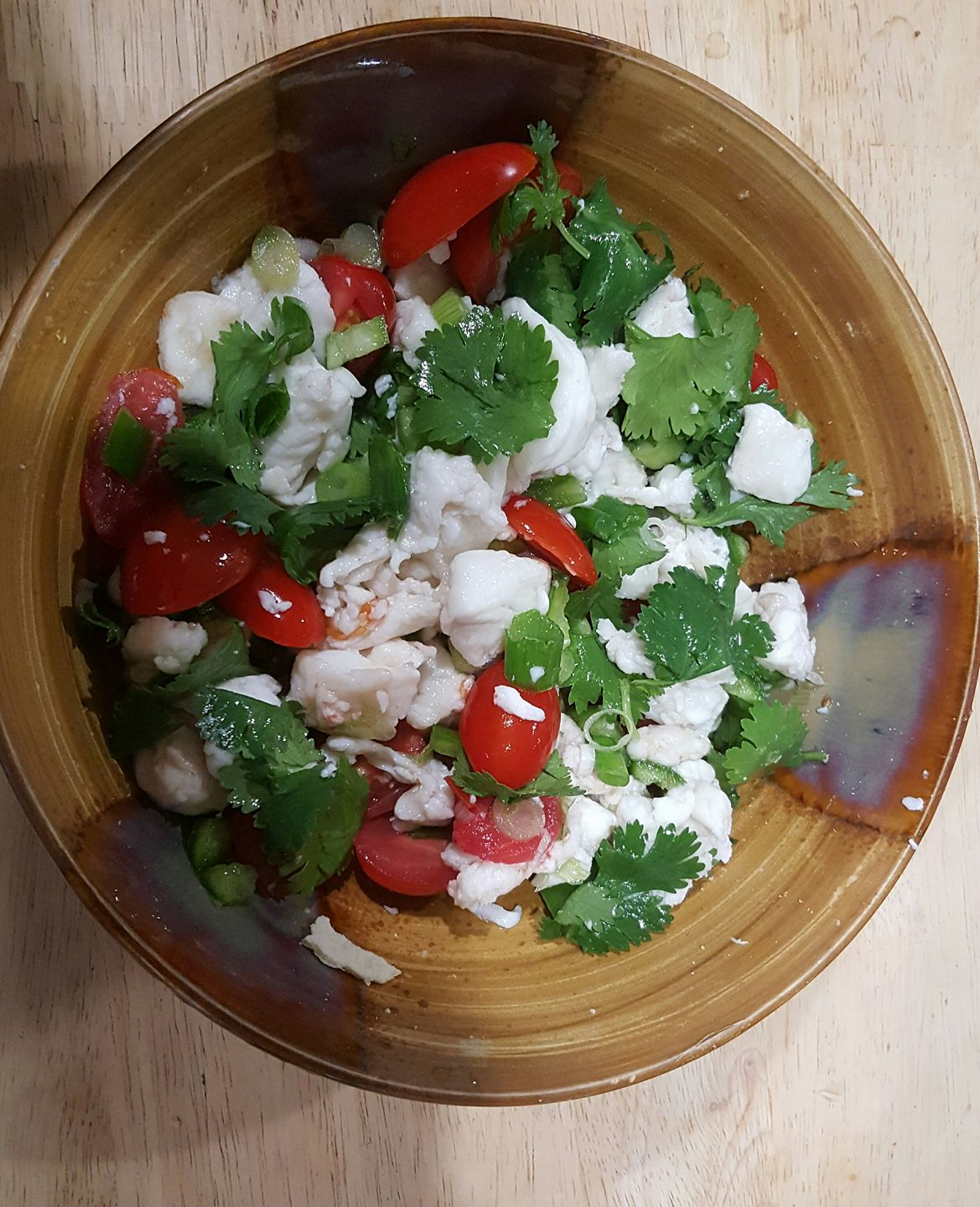
Alaskan ceviche made with Pacific halibut, serrano peppers, cilantro and tomato

In Mexico, the U.S., and some parts of Central America, it is served either in cocktail cups with tostadas or as a tostada topping and taco filling. In Mexico, when served in a cup with tomato sauce, it is called a ceviche cocktail. Shrimp, octopus, squid, tuna, and mackerel are also popular bases for Mexican ceviche. The marinade ingredients include salt, lime, onion, chili peppers, avocado, and cilantro (coriander). Cut olives and tomatoes are often added to the preparation.

In El Salvador and Nicaragua, one popular ceviche recipe is ceviche de concha negra ("black conch ceviche"), known in Mexico as pata de mula ("mule's foot"). It is dark, nearly black, with a distinct look and flavor. It is prepared with lime juice, onion, yerba buena, salt, pepper, tomato, Worcestershire sauce, and sometimes picante (any hot sauce or any kind of hot pepper) as desired.

The dish includes marinated fish, lime juice, salt, ground black pepper, finely minced onions, cilantro, and finely minced peppers in Nicaragua and Costa Rica. It is usually served in a cocktail glass with a lettuce leaf and soda crackers on the side, as in Mexico. Popular condiments are tomato ketchup, mayonnaise, and Tabasco sauce. The fish is typically tilapia or corvina, although mahi-mahi, shark, and marlin are also popular.

In Panama, ceviche is prepared with lemon juice, chopped onion, celery, cilantro, assorted peppers, and sea salt. Ceviche made with corvina (white sea bass) is very popular and is served as an appetizer in most local restaurants. It is also commonly prepared with octopus, shrimp, and squid or served with small pastry shells called "canastitas."

In the Caribbean, ceviche is often made using mahi-mahi prepared with lime juice, salt, onion, green pepper, habanero, and a touch of allspice. Squid and tuna are also popular. In Puerto Rico and other places in the Caribbean, the dish is prepared with coconut milk. In the Bahamas and south Florida, a conch ceviche, conch salad, is popular. It is prepared by marinating diced fresh conch in lime, chopped onions, and bell pepper. Diced pequin pepper or Scotch bonnet pepper is often added for spice. In south Florida, it is common to encounter a variation to which tomato juice has been added.

== Health risks ==
Aside from contaminants, raw seafood can also be the vector for various pathogens, viral and bacterial, as well as larger parasitic creatures. According to the United States Food and Drug Administration and studies since 2009, specific microbial hazards in ceviche include Anisakis simplex, Diphyllobothrium spp., Pseudoterranova decipiens and P. cattani, and Vibrio parahaemolyticus. Anisakiasis is a zoonotic disease caused by the ingestion of larval nematodes in raw seafood dishes such as ceviche. The Latin American cholera outbreaks in the 1990s may have been attributed to the consumption of raw cholera-infested seafood that was eaten as ceviche.

The American Dietetic Association urges women to avoid raw fish including ceviche during pregnancy due to the health risks it introduces if not cooked properly.

== UNESCO Intangible Cultural Heritage of Humanity ==
In December 2023, the practices and meanings associated with the preparation and consumption of ceviche, were recognized by UNESCO as an expression of Peruvian traditional cuisine and an Intangible Cultural Heritage of Humanity. The statement was made within the framework of the eighteenth session of its Intergovernmental Committee for the Safeguarding of the Intangible Cultural Heritage. As a basis for its decision, it was considered that the preparation and consumption of ceviche in Peru, "entail specific practices, knowledge and meanings at each stage, from fishing to cultivating the ingredients and preparing the dish. As recipes vary from one region to the next, the dish also strengthens regional cultural identity".

In awarding the honor to Peru's ceviche, UNESCO highlighted the role of the dish in Peru's cultural identity, the importance of artisanal sustainable fishers and traditional female ceviche cooks in cevicherías, regional variations of the dish, and how the knowledge of ingredients and techniques are passed down through families in Peru.

== See also ==
- Boquerones en vinagre – Anchovy tapa appetizer marinated in vinegar, garlic and parsley eaten in Spain
- Escabeche – Ibero-American fish, meat or vegetable dish, cooked and served in an acidic marinade
- Kinilaw – Filipino seafood dish of raw cubed fish mixed with vinegar and/or sour fruit juice
- Kilawin – Filipino dish of marinated meat
- 'Ota 'ika – Polynesian dish consisting of raw fish marinated in citrus juice and coconut milk
- List of raw fish dishes
- List of fish dishes

== Bibliography ==
- Bayless, Rick (2000). Mexico One Plate at aTime. Simon & Schuster. ISBN 0-684-84186-X.
- Butler, Cleora (2003). Cleora's Kitchens: The Memoir of a Cook and Eight Decades of Great American Food. Council Oak Books, LLC. ISBN 1-57178-133-1.
- "Revolución de los gustos en el Perú". Américas. General Secretariat of the Organization of American States. June 2006. ISBN 9780071596602.
- González, Marjorie Ross; Ross, Marjorie (2001). Entre el comal y la olla: fundamentos de gastronomía costarricense. Euned. ISBN 9789968311281.
- Harris, Jessica B. (2003). Beyond gumbo: Creole fusion food from the Atlantic Rim. Simon & Schuster. ISBN 0-684-87062-2.
- Meyer, Arthur L.; Vann, Jon M. (2003). The Appetizer Atlas: A World of Small Bites. John Wiley and Sons. ISBN 0-471-41102-7.
- Peschiera, Emilio (2005). Cocina Peruana. Ediciones Granica S.A. ISBN 956-8077-30-8.
- Presilla, Maricel (2012). Gran Cocina Latina. W. W. Norton & Company. p. 479. ISBN 978-0-393-05069-1.
- Rodriguez, Douglas (2010-06-08). The Great Ceviche Book. Ten Speed Press. p. 3. ISBN 978-1-58008-107-8.
