= Sancocho =

Traditional soup in several Latin American cuisines

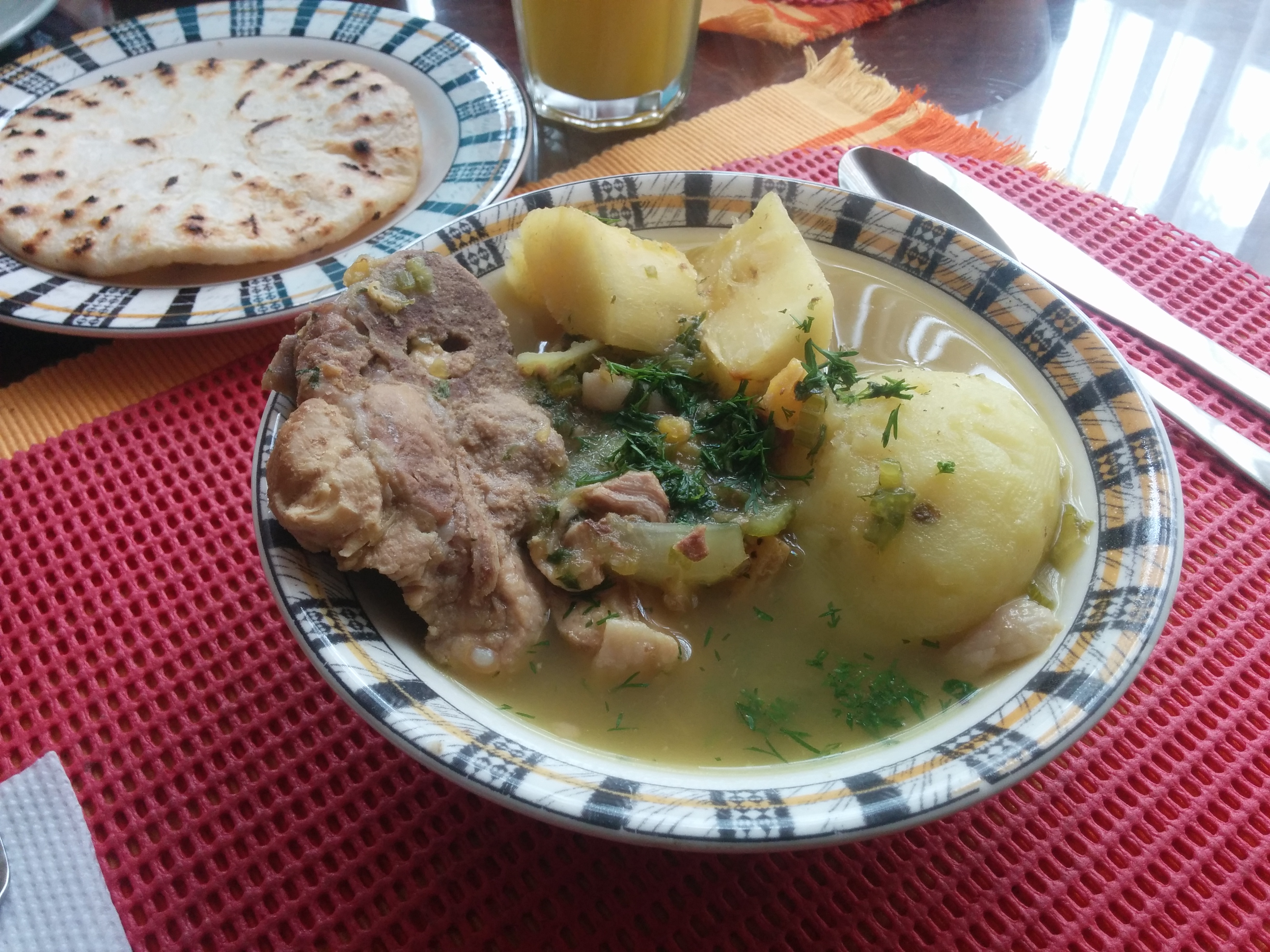
- Sancocho de espinazo de cerdo (pork spine sancocho)
- Type: Soup or stew
- Place of origin: Latin America, Asia (Philippines), Europe (Spain, Canary Islands)
- Region or state: Latin America
- Main ingredients: Meat, vegetables, broth, yuca, plantains

Sancocho (from the Spanish verb sancochar, 'to parboil') is a traditional stew in several Caribbean and Latin American cuisines. Latin variations represent popular national dishes in the Dominican Republic, Colombia, Cuba, Honduras, Mexico, Panama, Puerto Rico, Trinidad and Tobago and Venezuela. It usually consists of large pieces of meat, tubers and vegetables served in a broth.

== Colombia ==
Sancocho is a traditional food in Colombia made with many kinds of meat (most commonly chicken, hen, pork ribs, beef ribs, fish and ox tail) with large pieces of plantain, potato, cassava and/or other vegetables such as tomato, scallion, cilantro and mazorca (corn on the cob), depending on the region. Some top it off with fresh cilantro, onion and squeezed lime. It is also served with a side of sliced avocado and a plate of white rice, which is usually dipped in with each spoonful of soup.

== Panama ==
Also known as sancocho de gallina, it is the national dish of Panama. The basic ingredients are chicken, ñame (adding flavor and acting as a thickener, giving it its characteristic texture and brightness) and culantro (giving it most of its characteristic flavor and greenish tone); often yuca, mazorca (corn on the cob) and otoe are added. Other optional ingredients include ñampí (as the eddoe variety of taro is known), chopped onions, garlic and oregano. It is frequently served with white rice on the side, meant to be either mixed in or eaten with each spoonful. Hot sauce is frequently added, depending on regional and individual preferences. Regional varieties include sancocho chorrerano (a specialty of the town of La Chorrera, which is only made with free-range chicken, onions, garlic, chili peppers, oregano and ñame) and sancocho chiricano (a specialty from Chiriquí Province and the heartiest variety, containing squash in addition to all basic and optional ingredients mentioned before, having a yellowish color as a result). It is often recommended as the best remedy for a hangover. It is used as a metaphor for the country's racial diversity due to the varied ingredients that contribute their particular properties to and have an equally important role in the cooking process and final product.

== Philippines ==
Reflecting its Spanish influence, sancocho is eaten in the Philippines, where the hearty stew is made with fish, beef shanks, three kinds of meat, chicken, pork butt, bacon, chorizo de bilbao and morcilla (Spanish blood sausage) as well as yucca, potatoes, cilantro, corn, cabbage, bok choy, carrots and string beans. The Ilocano dish pinapaitan is also known as sankutsar (or singkutsar) is made from stewed goat (or beef) and offal flavored with its cud.

== Similar dishes ==
A soup similar to sancocho is called "sancoche" in Dominica, Grenada, Jamaica and Trinidad and Tobago.
