= Kelaguen =

Chamorro dish of meat and green onions in an acidic marinade

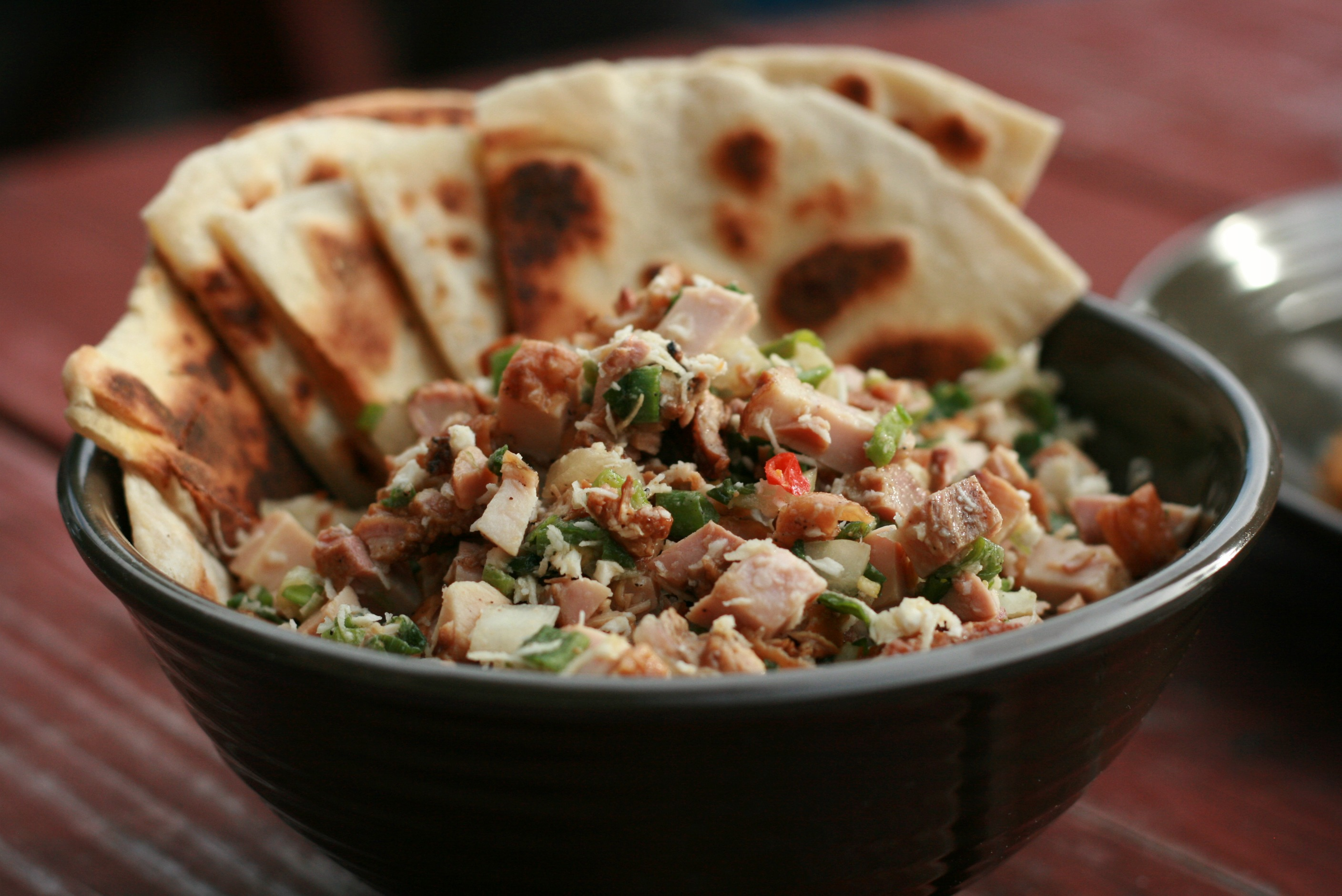
- Kelaguen with titiyas
- Place of origin: Mariana Islands
- Main ingredients: Pickling marinade of lemon juice, fresh coconut, green onions, salt and spicy hot peppers
- Similar dishes: Kilawin, kinilaw, 'ota 'ika, hinava, poke, ceviche

Kelaguen is a Chamorro dish from the Mariana Islands eaten as a side dish or as a main course. Similar to ceviche, a pickling marinade of lemon juice, fresh coconut, green onions, salt and spicy hot peppers or donni' is used to marinate cooked chicken, raw shrimp, fish or beef meat/liver. With the exception of the cooked chicken, the acids in the marinade "cook" the raw shrimp, fish or beef instead of heat. It is served cold or at room temperature and eaten as is, over rice, or wrapped in a warm corn or flour tortilla (or the Chamorro version, titiyas).

Kelaguen is derived from the Filipino kilawin. It was introduced by Filipino settlers when the Marianas and the Philippines were both part of the Spanish East Indies. Kelaguen, however, has diverged in that it also incorporates influences from Latin America, like the use of tortillas.

== See also ==
- Kilawin, the Filipino ancestor of the Chamorro kelaguen
- List of meat dishes
- List of raw fish dishes
- Cuisine of the Mariana Islands
