= Pinapaitan =

Filipino-Ilocano stew of goat meat and offal flavored with bile

Pinapaítan
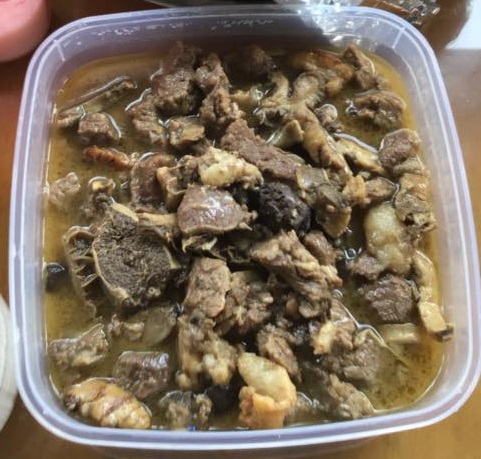
- A serving of pinapaítan made with goat meat and innards, traditionally seasoned with bile (paít)
- Alternative names: Papaítan, Sangkutsar
- Type: Stew, Soup
- Course: Main course, Appetizer
- Place of origin: Philippines
- Region or state: Ilocos region
- Associated cuisine: Filipino cuisine
- Serving temperature: Hot
- Main ingredients: Goat, cow, or carabao meat; offal (liver, intestines, kidneys); and bile or cud
- Ingredients generally used: Ginger, shallots (or onions), garlic, and chili peppers
- Variations: Sinanglao, Kinigtot, Kappukan (Ata-ata)
- Similar dishes: Sapie (柠檬撒), Niu Bie Tang (牛瘪汤), Nam Pia (Nặm pịa), Kaleskes

Pinapaitan, also known as papaítan or sangkutsar, is a Filipino stew characterized by its distinctive bitter, savory, and slightly sour flavor with a rich, earthy profile. It is traditionally prepared using ginger, meat and offal such as the liver, heart, kidneys, and intestines of goat, cow, or carabao. The dish’s signature bitterness comes from bile, chyme, or cud extracted from the gallbladder of these animals; in some preparations, traces of bile may also be present in the abomasum (the fourth stomach), where digestion occurs, contributing to the bitter taste. Pinapaitan originated in the Ilocos Region of northwestern Luzon, Philippines. It is commonly served as a main dish, a breakfast meal, or pulutan (food consumed with alcoholic beverages), and is often eaten with steamed rice.

Pinapaitan has numerous regional variations, some of which use calamansi or other bittering agents as substitutes for bile. The dish is often compared to sinanglao (also spelled sinanglaw), another Filipino-Ilocano innard soup, as both share similar ingredients and cooking methods; however, sinanglao does not include pait (bile). Pinapaitan is also comparable to other Ilocano dishes such as ata-ata, kinigtot, imbaliktad, and kappukan, which similarly use pait and comparable ingredients but differ in preparation and cooking techniques.

== Etymology ==
The name pinapaítan (or papaítan) is derived from the Ilocano root word paít, meaning "bitter" or "bitter taste," a direct reference to the dish's signature flavor, which comes from animal bile or cud (papaít). The term also reflects the process of making the stew bitter ("to have made bitter") and highlights the use of goat or beef innards, demonstrating Ilocano resourcefulness and preference for distinct flavors.

Its alternative name, sangkutsar, is a Filipinized form of the Spanish term sancochar, meaning "to parboil," referring to the cooking method used in preparing the dish.

== History ==
Pinapaitan has been a staple of Ilocano cuisine for centuries and remains a popular comfort food today.

The most probable origin of pinapaitan is from the Spanish colonial era. In the early 1800s, the Spanish friars would get the best meat, while the Filipinos were given the less desirable cuts. Pinapaitan is said to be a product of this resourcefulness, which dates back to that time.

== Preparation ==
Pinapaitan is typically prepared the same day the goat (or cattle) is butchered. Bile is collected from the liver and gallbladder, or cud from the stomach or small intestines of the same animal.

The meat and offal are sliced into thin bitesize pieces 3 cm to 5 cm and parboiled in water mixed with vinegar to remove impurities or gaminess. Aromatics vegetables, primarily ginger (optionally garlic or shallots) is sauteed, followed by the meat and offal. Water is added to the meat and simmered until tender.

The bile (or cud) is added to the stew towards the end of the cooking process. It is optionally soured with vinegar, bilimbi, or tamarind (pulp or leaves), or spiced with chili peppers. It may be seasoned with salt, patis, or MSG.

Some recipes use bittermelon, or its leaves, as a substitute for bile or when it is not available.

== Similar dishes ==
Kinigtot (lit. "surprised") or ginulat is a similar Ilocano stir-fried dish using goat meat or beef, which is mixed with papait. Kilawin is another Ilocano dish with parcooked goat that is traditionally eaten with papait.

Ilocanos are not the only ones partial to bitter flavors using bile. Niu bie tang is a soup made by the Dong ethnic group in the Guizhou Province of China. Cattle are fed fine grass and herbs before slaughtering and extracting the ingredients. Other ingredients are added to the cud and bile and boiled to make a soup. People in Guizhou enjoy the soup as the base of noodle dishes.

The Dai ethnic group in southern Yunnan is noted for its noodle dish sapie (撒撇), a dish laced with bile and chyme. Similarly, the Thái people (Vietnam) in Vietnam also has a dish called nậm pịa or nặm pịa (intestine juice). The Isan ethnic community in northern Thailand and Laotians, also feature bile in laap (ລາບ). Further afield in Italy, chyme from unweaned calves furnishes the sauce for a Roman dish called pajata.

== See also ==
- Ilocano Cuisine
- Kilawin – Filipino dish of marinated meat
