= Dinakdakan =

Filipino dish of boiled and grilled pork parts

- Alternative names: Warek-warek
- Course: Appetizer or Main course
- Place of origin: Philippines
- Region or state: Ilocos Region
- Serving temperature: Hot or Room temperature
- Main ingredients: Pork (jowls, neck, ears, innards and pig’s brain or mayonnaise as a substitute), vinegar, calamansi, onions, ginger, chilies, and black pepper.
- Similar dishes: Insarabasab, Pulpog, Kilawin, Sisig

Dinakdakan also known as warek-warek, is a tangy and creamy Filipino dish made from chopped pork—commonly jowls, neck, snout, ears, innards, and traditionally pig’s brain—that is grilled or boiled, then marinated and seasoned with vinegar or citrus juice, typically calamansi. Originating from the Ilocos Region, it is commonly served as pulutan (food eaten with alcoholic beverages) and is sometimes eaten with rice.

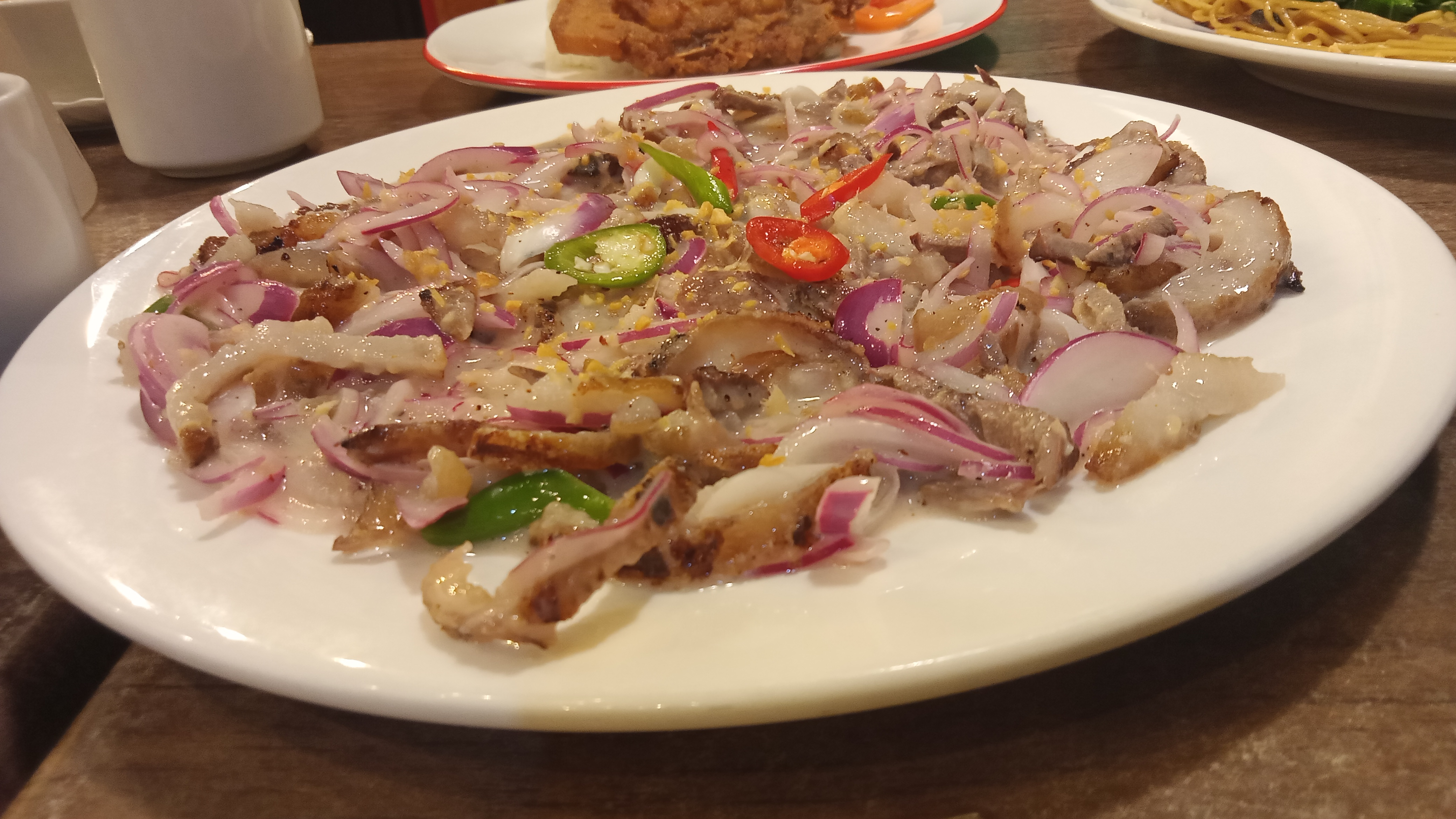
Dinakdakan (also known as warek-warek), seasoned with vinegar, onions, ginger, and chilies.

The main ingredients of dinakdakan include vinegar (sukang-Iloko), calamansi, chilies, onions or shallots, minced ginger, and salt and pepper. The dish is often compared to sisig, another Filipino pork dish; however, unlike sisig, dinakdakan usually features larger, less finely chopped pieces of meat and traditionally includes mashed pig’s brain as a creamy component, with mayonnaise commonly used as a modern substitute.

== Etymology ==
The name dinakdakán is believed to be derived from the Iloco (Ilocano) word dakdák, meaning “to chop” or “to make a chopping sound.” The term refers to the act of chopping meat into small pieces, reflecting the dish’s method of preparation.

Its alternate name, warek-warek, comes from the Iloco (Ilocano) word warek, meaning “to mix vigorously,” with the reduplication emphasizing the thorough tossing of the ingredients.

== Ingredients and Preparation ==
Dinakdakan is traditionally made from pork jowls, ears, and neck, though some recipes also include tongue, stomach, and intestines. The meat is first boiled until tender, then grilled to develop a smoky flavor. After grilling, it is chopped into small pieces and mixed with either mashed pig’s brain or mayonnaise as a creamy binder. The dish is seasoned with onions or shallots, minced ginger, chilies, black pepper, and calamansi juice, creating a tangy and slightly spicy flavor characteristic of Ilocano cuisine.

== Variations ==
Traditionally, dinakdakan uses boiled and mashed pig’s brain as a creamy binder. Due to limited availability and personal preference, mayonnaise is commonly used in modern preparations as a substitute, providing a similar richness and texture.

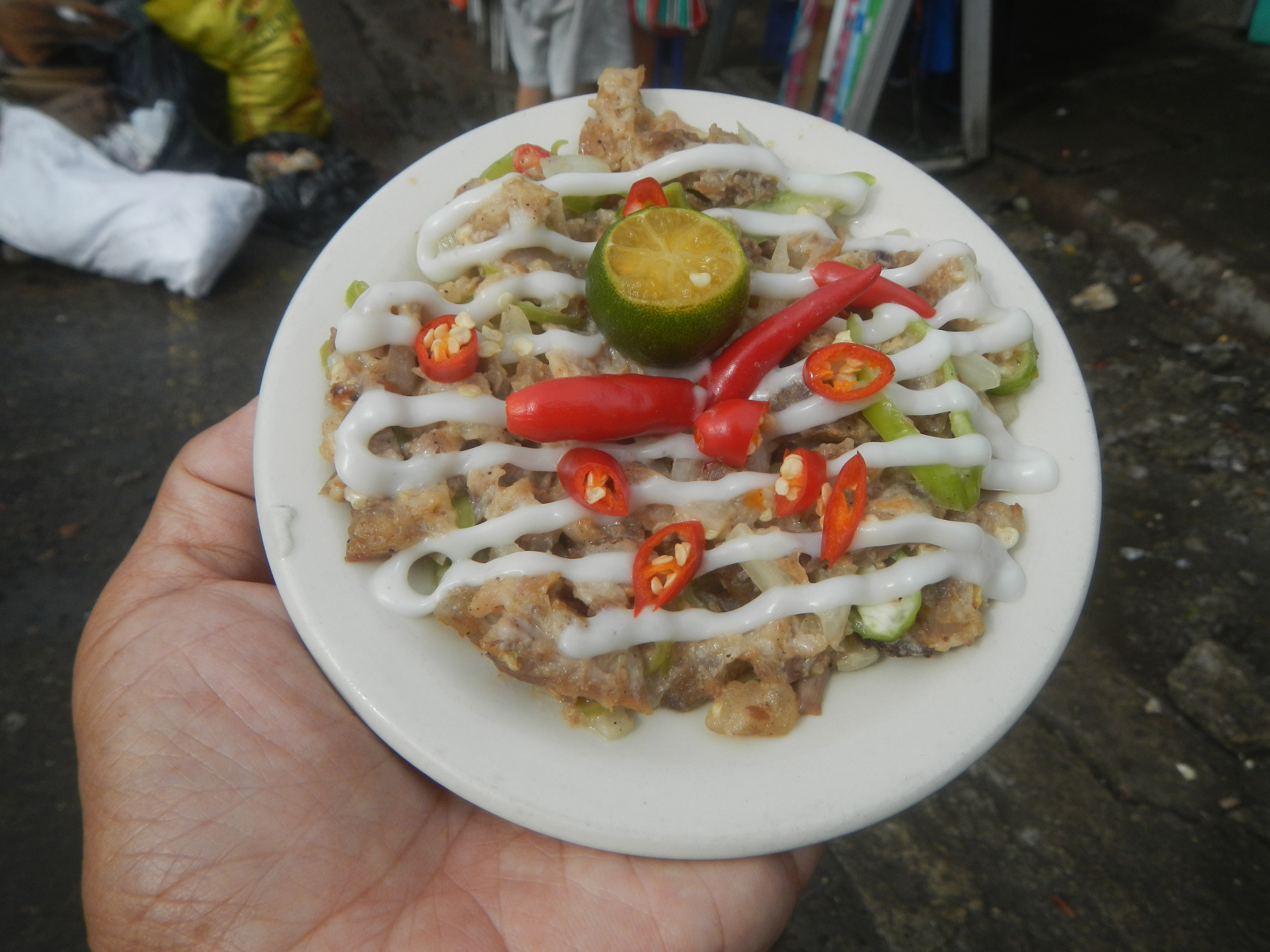
Dinakdakan with a mayonnaise as a substitute for pig’s brain

- Insarabasab (also known as sarabasab) is a related Ilocano dish made from grilled pork parts such as jowls, snout, ears, and innards. It follows a similar preparation to dinakdakan but does not include pig’s brain or mayonnaise. The term sarabasab in Iloco (Ilocano) means “something burned over an open fire,” referring to meat roasted directly over flames.
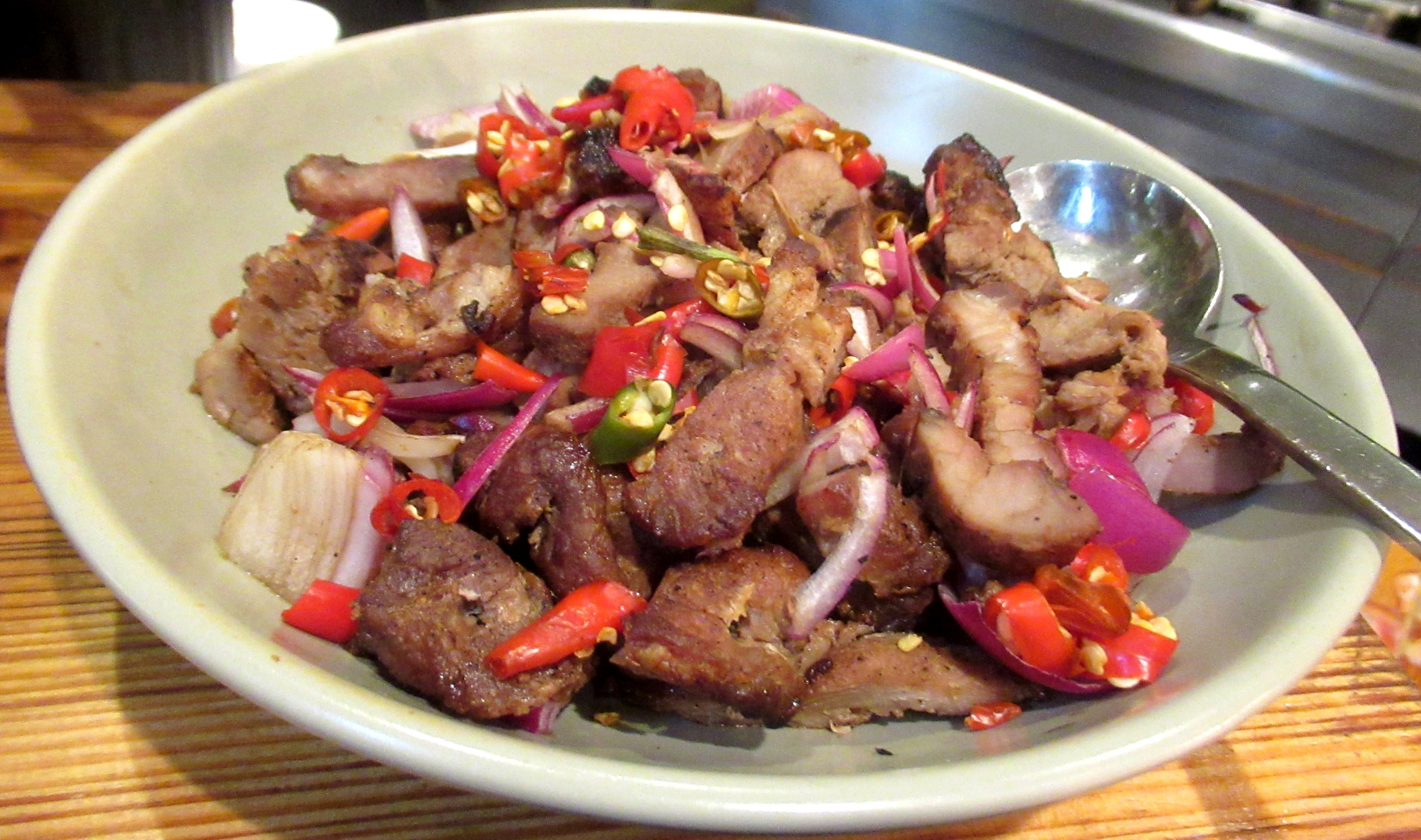
  Insarabasab (also known as sarabasab), an grilled pork dish similar to dinakdakan, but prepared without pig’s brain or mayonnaise.
- Pulpog (also known as pinulpugan or pinulpog) is another Ilocano grilled pork dish, typically using liempo (pork belly). The word "pulpog" translates to "cooked over an open charcoal fire" in Ilocano. The meat is grilled and seasoned or marinated with vinegar, onions, and spices. While similar to insarabasab, pulpog generally uses simpler cuts and seasonings.

== Related Dishes ==
Sisig — A Kapampangan dish that also uses pork scraps, jowls, and sometimes brain.

Kilawin — Another Ilocano dish of lightly cooked or vinegared meat; some recipes overlap with dinakdakan components.

== See also ==
Igado

Paklay

List of pork dishes
