= Kilawin =

Filipino dish of marinated meat

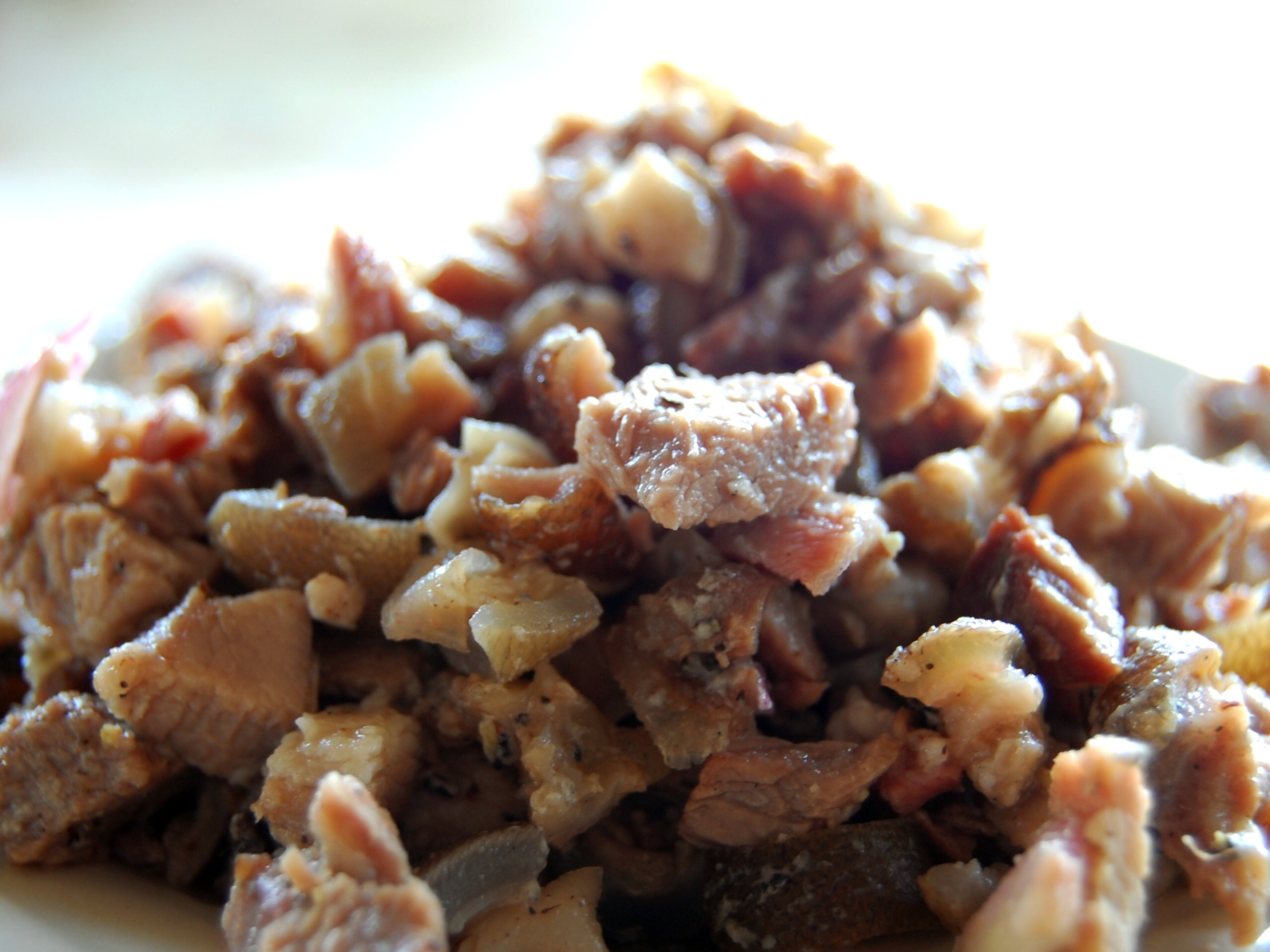
- Kilawin a kaldíng, a kilawin dish made from goat meat, marinated in cane vinegar and seasoned with finely chopped onions, ginger, salt, pepper, and calamansi.
- Alternative names: Kilawen, Kinilaw, Ata-ata, Kappukan
- Course: Appetizer or Main course
- Place of origin: Philippines
- Region or state: Ilocos Region
- Serving temperature: Room temperature, cold
- Main ingredients: Meat, sugarcane vinegar, calamansi, onion, ginger, salt, black pepper
- Variations: Goat, beef, carabao, pork, fish
- Similar dishes: Dinakdakan, Pinapaitan, Sisig

Kilawin (also spelled Kilawén) is a Filipino dish consisting of chopped raw, grilled, or boiled meat—such as fish, pork, goat, beef, or carabao—marinated in vinegar or citrus juices. It is commonly served as an appetizer or as finger food with alcoholic beverages. Originating from the Ilocos Region, kilawin is considered the Ilocano counterpart of Visayan and Tagalog kinilaw, but unlike kinilaw, it is not limited to raw meat.

Kilawén is closely associated with the Ilocano dish kilawén a kaldíng (Tagalog: kilawing kambing), which uses lightly grilled goat meat and is traditionally eaten with papaít, a bittering agent usually derived from bile or chyme extracted from the animal’s internal organs.

Among Ilocanos, kilawén functions as an intransitive verb referring broadly to a method of food preparation that includes raw, lightly cooked, grilled, boiled, or cured dishes, encompassing foods that would elsewhere be classified as kinilaw. In contrast, non-Ilocano Filipinos often use the term kilawén more narrowly to describe cooked meat dishes prepared in a vinegar-based style similar to adobo or paksiw.

== Etymology ==
The term kilawin (also rendered as kilawén) is derived from the Iloco (Ilocano) word kiláw, meaning “to eat raw or lightly cooked meat or fish.” The suffix -en indicates a completed action or state, conveying the sense of “prepared in the kilaw style,” i.e., marinated and seasoned with vinegar or citrus juice and ready to eat.

Kilawin is linguistically and culturally related to similar dishes found among various Philippine ethnolinguistic groups, including Tagalog, Kapampangan, Cebuano, and Hiligaynon, such as kinilaw, kilayen, kinilnat, kulao, kulawo, and kelaguen. These dishes reflect a longstanding Philippine culinary tradition of consuming fresh or lightly cured meats and seafood, typically preserved or seasoned with vinegar or citrus juices.

== Variations ==
In Northern Luzon, particularly among the Ilocanos, a variety of raw, boiled, lightly grilled meats, including beef, carabao, chicken, fish, goat, pork (or boar), shellfish, and venison, are commonly prepared as kilawin or kilawen. Traditionally, these meats were cured using vinegar, specifically sukang Iloko (sugarcane vinegar), before consumption. In contemporary practices, the meats are often lightly cooked, typically grilled, before being marinated in vinegar.

Citrus juices, such as those from lemons, dayap, or calamansi, are frequently used as alternatives to vinegar. Onions or shallots, along with ginger, are common additions that enhance the dish’s flavor profile. To introduce heat, pepper or chili is often included. These variations highlight the versatility and enduring popularity of kilawin or kilawen within Ilocano cuisine.

Notable varieties of Ilocano kilawin include:

- Kilawin a Kalding – Made from slightly grilled chevon or mutton (goat) meat and skin marinated in vinegar and seasoned with shallots, ginger, chili, and salt.
- Kilawin a Ipon – Made from fresh ipon (baby anchovies or small fish) marinated in vinegar and seasoned with shallots, ginger, chili, and salt.
- Kudil (Caliente) – Made from boiled cow or carabao skin, softened, marinated in vinegar, and seasoned with shallots, ginger, chili, and salt.
- Dinakdakan – Grilled pork seasoned with vinegar, shallots, ginger, chili, salt, and pig’s brain.
- Insarabasab – Similar to dinakdakan but without pig’s brain.
- Ata-ata (Kappukan) – Raw, rare beef or carabao meat seasoned with papait, shallots, ginger, chili, and salt

Among the Kapampangan people, kilayin uses fully cooked pork, heart, liver, and tripe. A similar dish in Cavite uses fully boiled pig ears known as kulao or kilawin na tainga ng baboy, or tokwa't baboy when mixed with fried tofu cubes. Modern variants of this dish use soy sauce in addition to the other ingredients.

== Risks ==
In the late 1960s, kilawin consumption of the gudgeon fish contributed to the intestinal capillariasis epidemic where there were 1,884 cases and 110 deaths.

== See also ==
- Dinakdakan – Filipino dish of boiled and grilled pork parts
- Kelaguen – Chamorro dish of meat and green onions in an acidic marinade
- Kinilaw – Filipino seafood dish
- Kinilnat – Ilocano-Filipino salad dish
- Kulawo – Filipino eggplant salad
- Pinapaitan – Filipino-Ilocano stew of goat meat and offal flavored with bile
- Tataki – Food preparation methods in Japanese cuisine
