= List of shopping malls in Pampanga =

SM City San Fernando Downtown

Pampanga has large and high-end malls in Central Luzon. SM City Pampanga is one of the largest in the region and one of the longest malls in the Philippines. The Marquee Mall Ayala contains luxury shops and restaurants, and has a unique design.

== Angeles City ==
MarQuee Mall front entrance

Nepo Mall front entrance

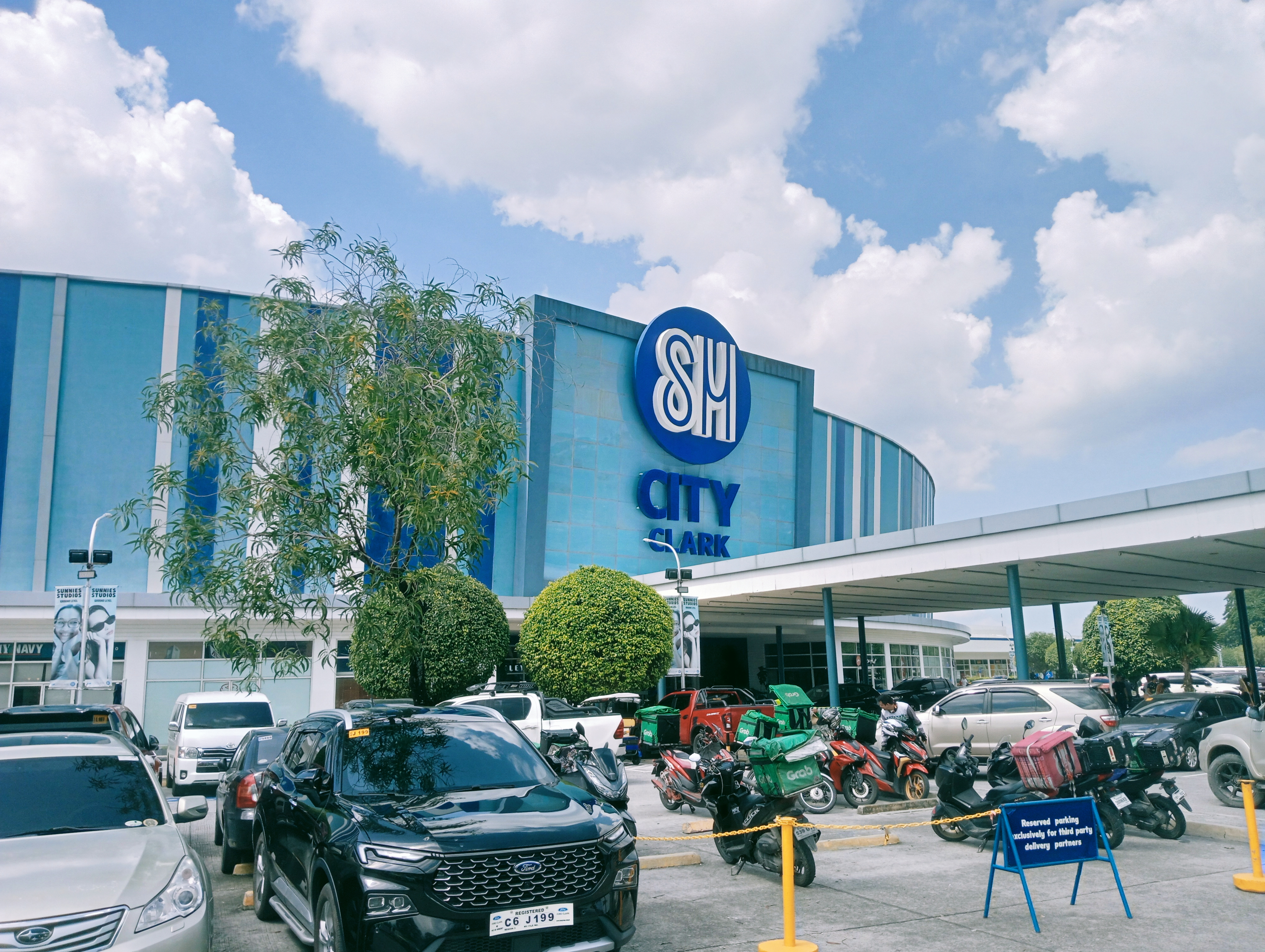
SM City Clark new facade

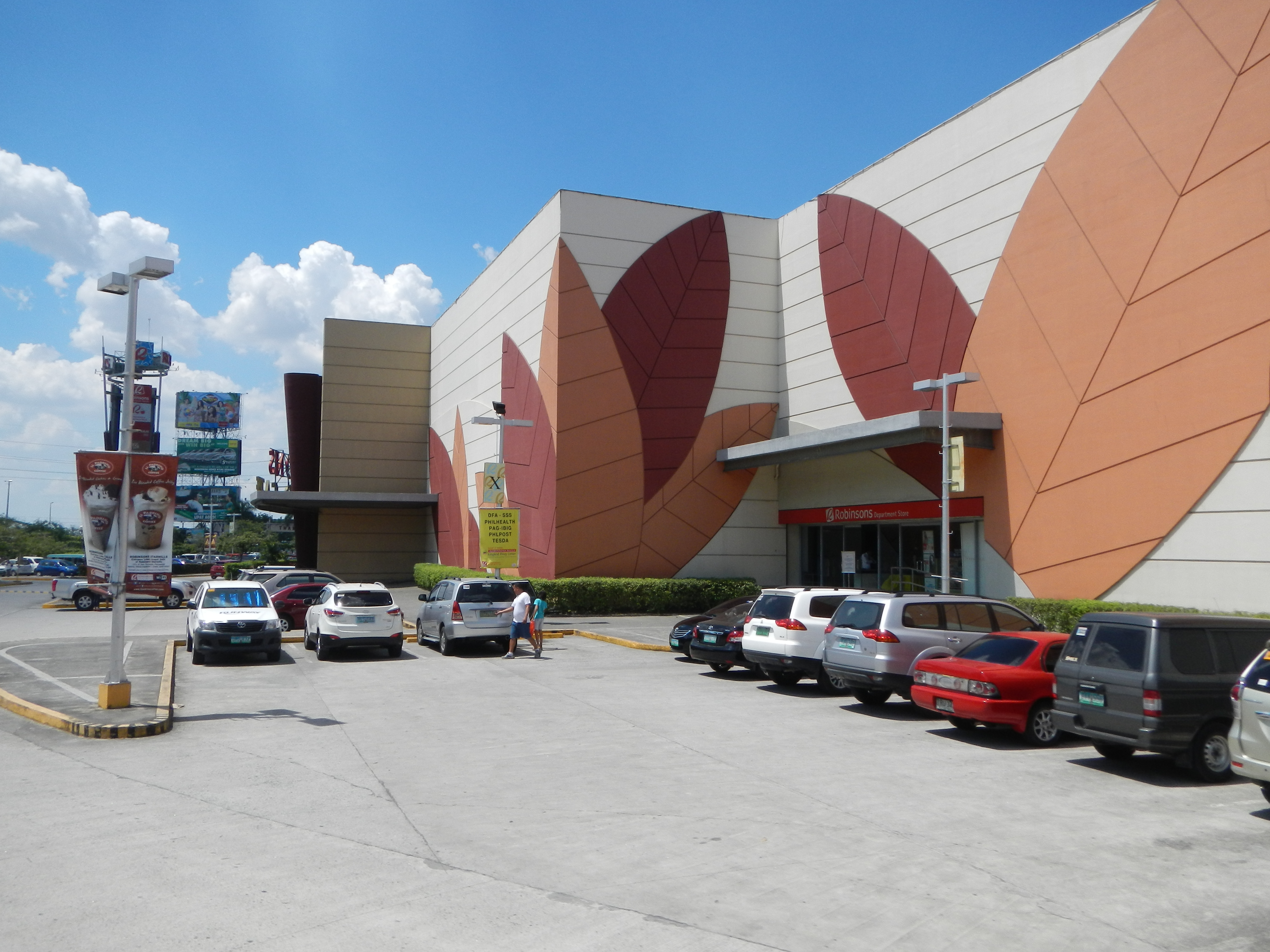
Robinsons Starmills JASA, San Fernando

A view of SM City Pampanga taken from an overpass

Name	Owner
Jenra Grand Mall	
Metro Supermarket Angeles	
Marquee Mall	Ayala Land
Nepo Mall Angeles	
Robinsons Angeles	Robinsons Land Corporation
Saver's Mall Balibago	
SM City Clark	SM Prime Holdings
SM Savemore Market Angeles	SM Prime Holdings

== San Fernando ==
Name	Location	Owner
Jenra Mall Sindalan	San Fernando	
Jenra Mall Dolores	San Fernando	
Robinsons Starmills	JASA, San Fernando	Robinsons Land Corporation
BuyMaxx Supermarket	San Fernando	
Robinsons Supermarket	San Fernando	
SM City Pampanga	Mexico/San Fernando	SM Prime Holdings
SM City San Fernando Downtown	San Fernando	SM Prime Holdings
SM City Telabastagan	San Fernando	SM Prime Holdings
S&R Membership Shopping	JASA, San Fernando	
Vista Mall Pampanga	San Fernando	Vista Land
Walter Mart San Fernando	San Fernando	WM Property Management, Inc.
