= Museo ning Angeles =

Museum in Angeles City, Philippines

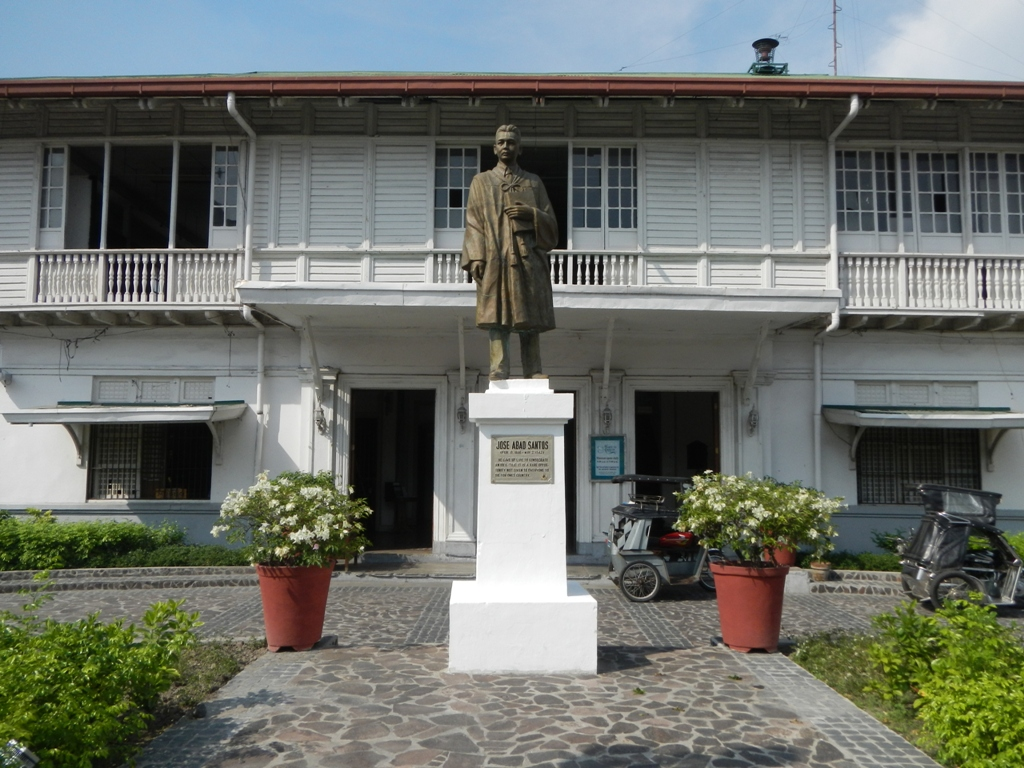
- Established: 1999
- Location: Angeles City, Philippines
- Coordinates: 15°08′05″N 120°35′28″E
- Type: Art, history, and food museum
- Owner: Kuliat Foundation
- Building details

General information
- Completed: 1922
- Renovated: 1998

Technical details
- Floor count: 2

The Museo ning Angeles (Kapampangan for "Museum of Angeles") is a museum in Angeles City, Philippines. It is run by the Kuliat Foundation.

== History ==
The site of the current Museo ning Angeles in Barangay Santo Rosario was formerly occupied by Angeles' casa tribunal or court house during the Spanish colonial era which was burned down in 1860. The present building was constructed in 1922 and served as Angeles' town hall until 1998. The building was then repurposed as a museum in 1999 with the city jail and a police station converted to a museum office and souvenir shop respectively.

== Layout and exhibits ==
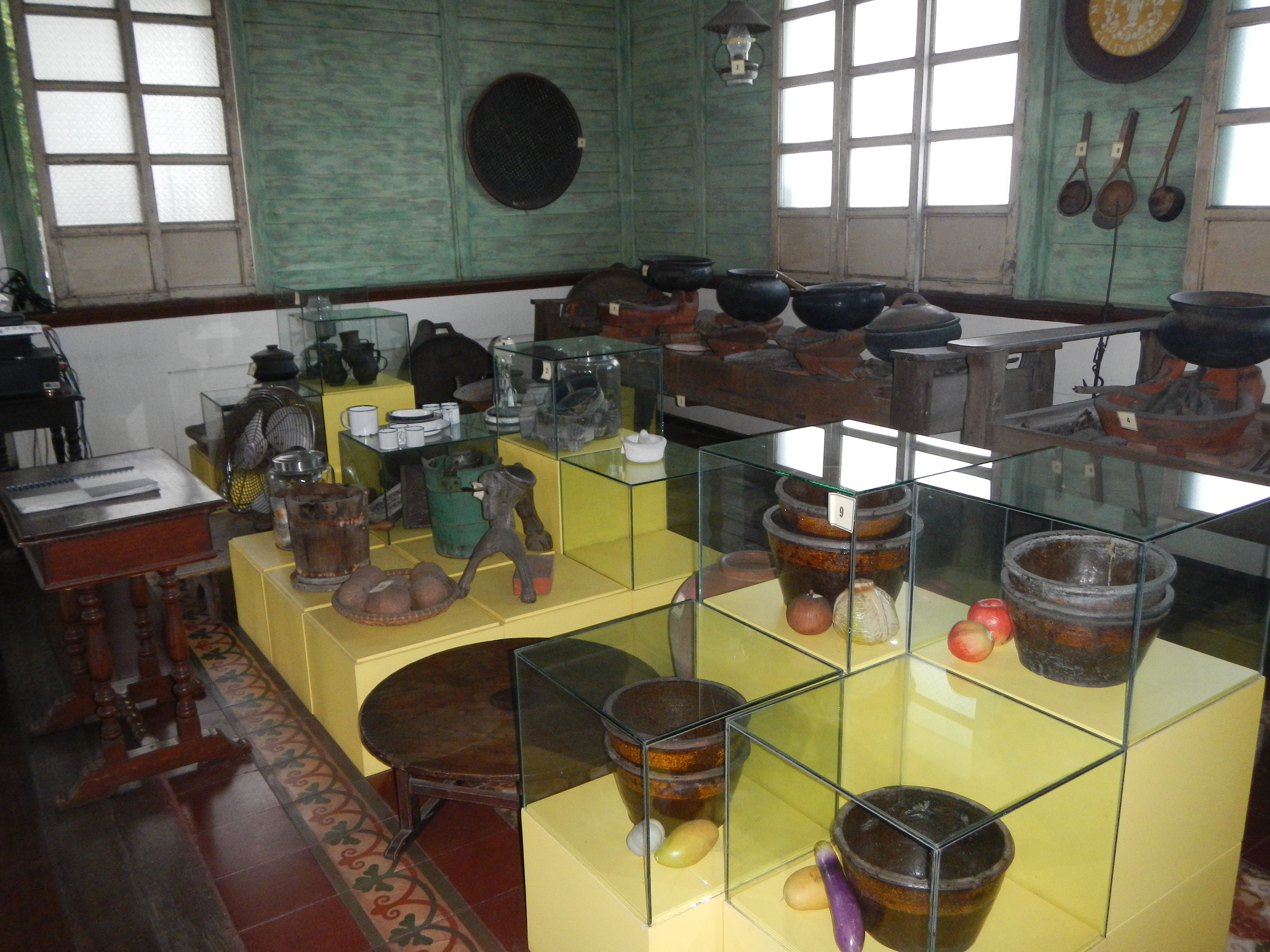
Exhibits at the museum

Among the permanent exhibits of the Museo ning Angeles, are sections dedicated to the history of Angeles and the former Clark Air Base, as well as clothing articles designed by Angeles native Patis Pamintuan-Tesoro. Known as the "Grand Dame of Philippine Fashion", Pamintuan-Tesoro is noted for using indigenous materials such as abaca and piña for her works. The museum also hosts the Culinarium, a section dedicated to Kapampangan cuisine and cooking methods as well as an art gallery.

A statue of José Abad Santos also fronts the museum building.

== Administration ==
The Kuliat Foundation, a privately owned non-profit organization is responsible for the administration of the museum including the preservation of the historic museum building. It largely relies on donations for the museum's expenses.

== Cultural significance ==
The museum building was recognized as an Important Cultural Property by the National Museum of the Philippines on June 12, 2012.
