= Fields Avenue (Angeles City) =

Road in Central Luzon, Philippines

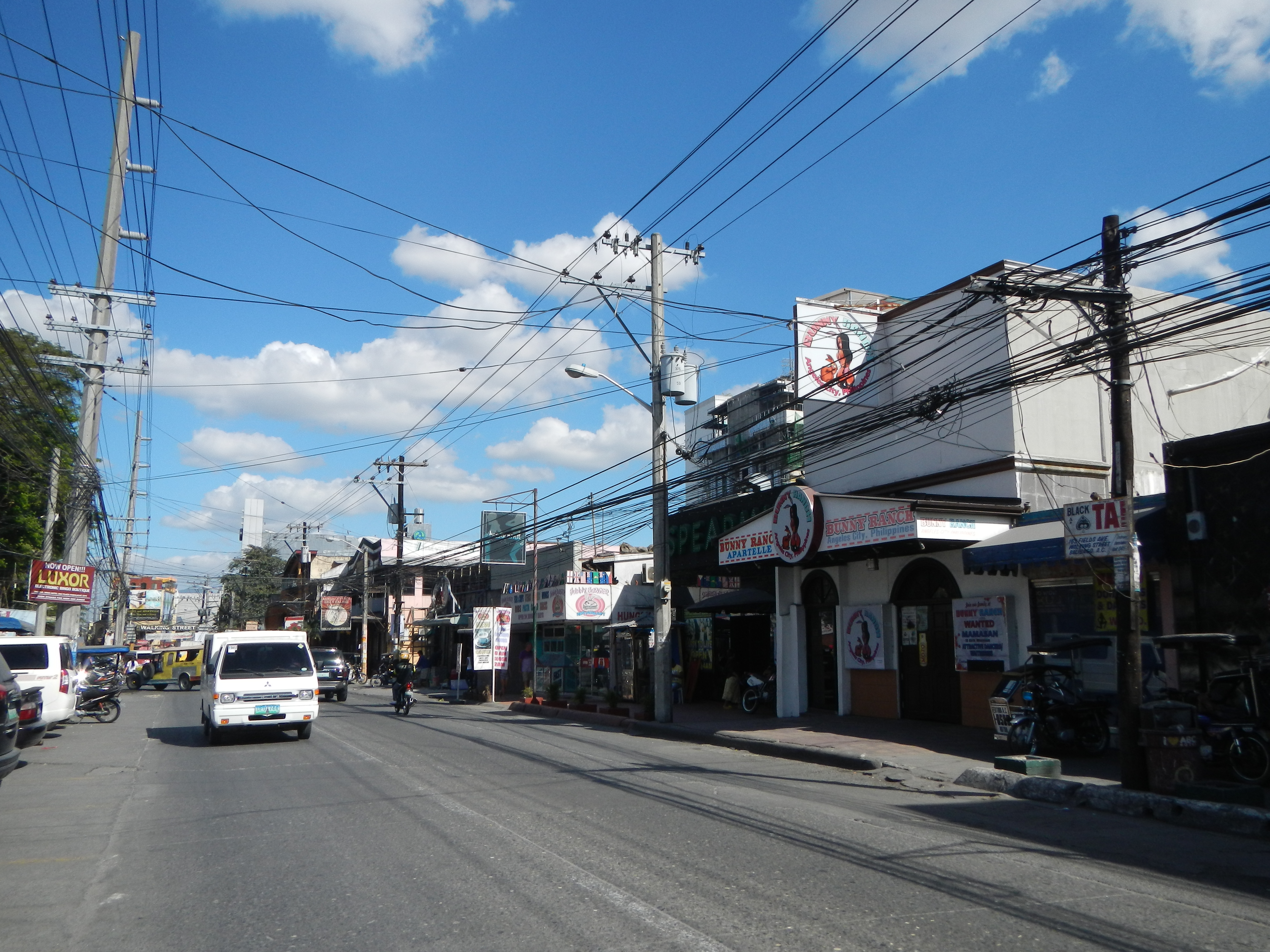
Fields Avenue in Balibago, Angeles

Fields Avenue is a major street running through Balibago area of Angeles City in the Philippines. It is the center of the red light district and the bar scene of the biggest entertainment district of the Philippines.

The name derives from the common military practice of naming roads adjacent to airfields as "Field" Street or "Field avenue". Originally the name referred to the Clark Air Base and was "Clark Field Avenue". The name evolved to become Fields Avenue.

== History ==
Philippines was an American colony from 1898 to 1946. Bars on Fields Avenue catering to the single American defense personnel, who worked in the adjacent Clark Air Base, first emerged in 1940. During 1940s and 50s there were only 3 such bars just outside the main gate of the airbase, By early 1960s, the Fields Avenue developed as a street lined with several bars. From November 1955 to April 1975 America fought Vietnam War, as the number of American troops in this war grew, more and more forces were deployed at Clark airbase or routed through it. This led to a proliferation of bars, live bands and prostitution, the latter mostly by young Filipina women, most of them either teenagers or 18–55 years old. By the 1970s, there were more than 150 bars and prostitution joints along Fields Avenue. This led to a mushrooming of related ancillary industries in the vicinity, namely music bands, hotels, doctors, hairdressers and money exchange / transfer services. In its heyday, Fields Avenue provided direct or direct employment to nearly 20,000 Filipinos including plumbers, electricians and security guards. In the 1980s, though the American presence remained steady, the bars and prostitution shops continued to proliferate. Many bars and prostitution dens were owned by Americans as well as local politicians, thus leading to a nexus between the locals, politicians and American military and ex military personnel.

With the withdrawal of American defense forces from Clark in 1993, many of these establishments changed hands but continued to do business. As Clark was turned into a Special Economic Zone (SEZ), these bars and prostitution joints changed their clientele to suit their new customers - Japanese and Korean businessmen. Restaurants serving food from these countries began to appear and signboards in these languages were put up. The period from 2000-2010 saw further expansion of these joints, as the area was relabeled as an "entertainment district". While prostitution was officially banned, girls working here were simply redesignated as "Guest Relations Officers" (GRO) and prostitution continued in practice. Since then, bars and prostitution joints have continued to proliferate and expand, the extent of these establishments has continued further on both sides of Fields Avenue and many smaller streets off Fields Avenue also sport smaller such establishments.

In 2010, a section of Fields Avenue at the end where it meets the N2 MacArthur Highway was named as "Walking Street", mimicking Walking Street in Pattaya; this section was made pedestrians only, with road traffic banned from 6 pm to 6 am. People arriving by air either take a taxi direct to hotel or a jeepny to Main Gate Jeepney Terminal located between to north SM mall, Fields Avenue to south and Bayanihan Park to east. Those arriving from Manila by bus, ask the driver to drop them off at the corner of Fields Avenue and MacArthur Highway, or alight at Capas-Angeles Transport Terminal which is also walking distance from Fields Avenue and the MacArthur Highway.

The presence of family oriented activities on the other side of Fields Avenue, namely shopping malls as well as activity centers in Clark air base has led to a neat separation between the two. Fields Avenue tends to cater more to single foreigner men (and sometimes women too, with at least five bars featuring gigolos and gays) while the rest of Clark caters to family based entertainment.

Fields Avenue remains among the safest streets in the region, with a very low crime rate, exceptionally few robberies, fights or murders.

== Restaurants and hotels ==
Fields Avenue has the largest density of hotels in Philippines, catering to all budgets, from a large number of two star and three star hotels right up to a select few luxurious five star hotels. Many of the bars and Hotels in Fields Avenue have restaurants attached. Fields Avenue has among the largest variety of restaurants in Philippines, with cuisines ranging from European, Continental, Japanese, Korean, Australian and a select few restaurants serving Indian, Arabic and Filipino food. Restaurants tend to have long opening hours, most of them open late and close late (up to 4 am) though a reasonably number of them open early (around 7 am). A few restaurants are open 24 hours. Most Filipino and international fast food chains including McDonald's, KFC and Jollibee have at least one branch along or near Fields Avenue. A 24-hour police station is located in the center of Fields Avenue.

== See also ==
- Prostitution in the Philippines
- Red-light district
