= MarQuee Mall =

Ayala Malls MarQuee

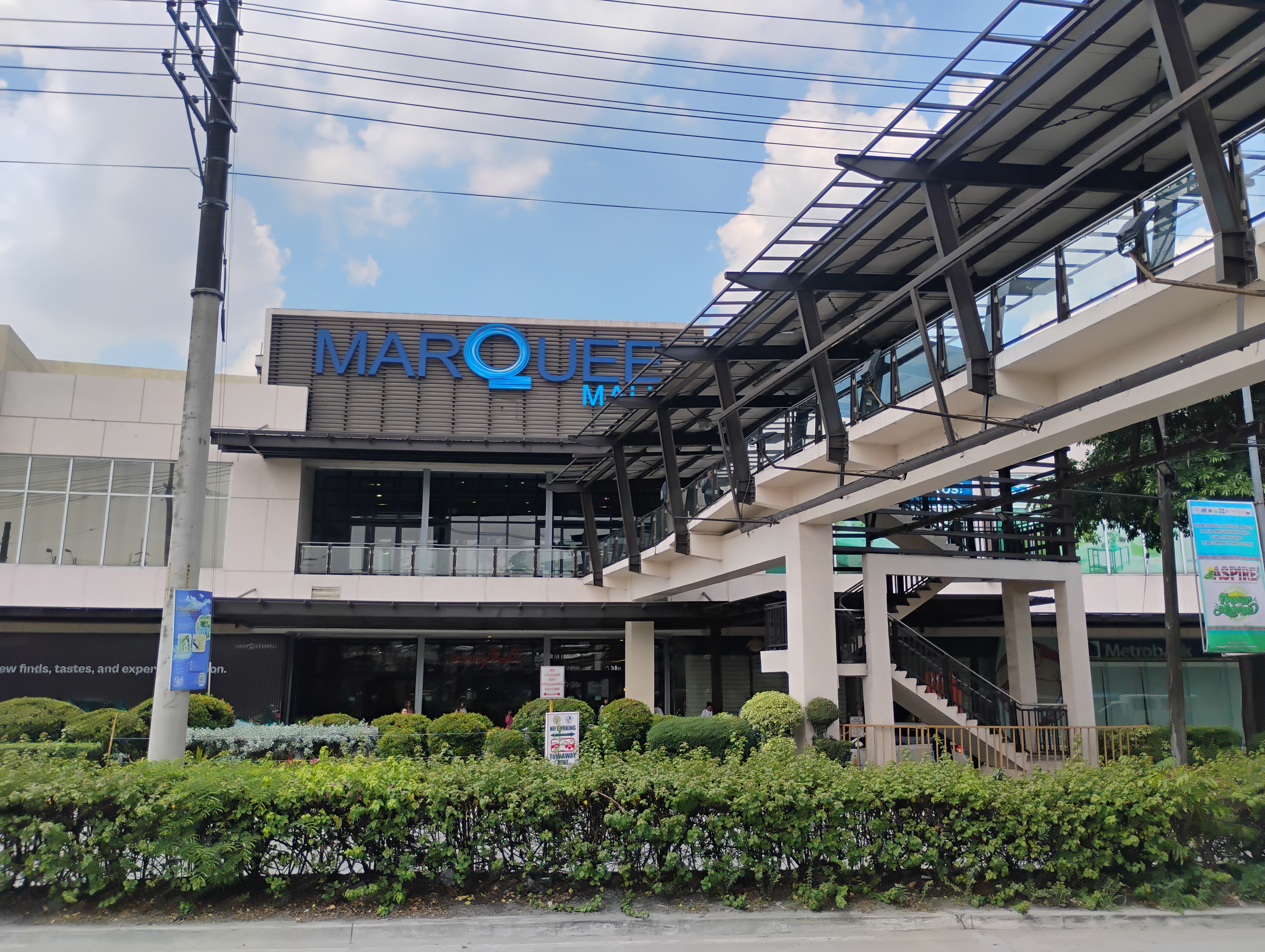
- Location: Pulung Maragul, Angeles City, Pampanga, Philippines
- Coordinates: 15°09′50″N 120°36′37″E
- Opened: September 23, 2009; 17 years ago
- Developer: Ayala Land
- Manager: Ayala Corporation
- Owner: Ayala
- Num. of stores: Over 450 shops and restaurants
- Floor area: 140,000 square meters (1,500,000 sq ft)
- Floors: 3 (mall); 14 (Condo B); 8 (Condo A)
- Parking: More than 1,000 cars
- Website: Main website

Ayala Malls MarQuee, also known as MarQuee Mall, is a shopping mall owned and operated by the North Beacon Commercial Corporation, a 100% wholly owned subsidiary of Ayala Land. It is located in Barangay Pulung Maragul, Angeles City, Pampanga, Philippines. The mall has a land area of 9.3 hectares (23 acres) and a gross floor area of 140,000 square meters (1,500,000 sq ft).

== Location ==
Ayala Malls MarQuee is located along Aniceto Gueco Avenue in Angeles City, Philippines. The mall is adjacent to the North Luzon Expressway's Angeles Exit, as well as the Angeles City Hall Complex.

== Physical details ==
Ayala Malls MarQuee is the retail component of MarQuee, a 53-hectare (130-acre) integrated community developed by Ayala Land that includes MarQuee Place, a residential development located a few hundred meters away as well as MarQuee Residences, a two-tower condominium right within the mall complex. The mall complex also features a chapel on its third floor as well as an outdoor park facing MarQuee Residences. In July 2012, the Department of Foreign Affairs inaugurated its second passport office in Pampanga at the mall's third level.

=== MarQuee Residences ===
MarQuee Residences, June 2014

Within the complex is the 14 and 8-storey MarQuee Residences. It is a residential complex developed by Alveo. It has 2 towers with one at 14-storeys and the other at 8-storeys.

== Gallery ==
The facade of Ayala Malls Marquee facing A. Gueco Avenue

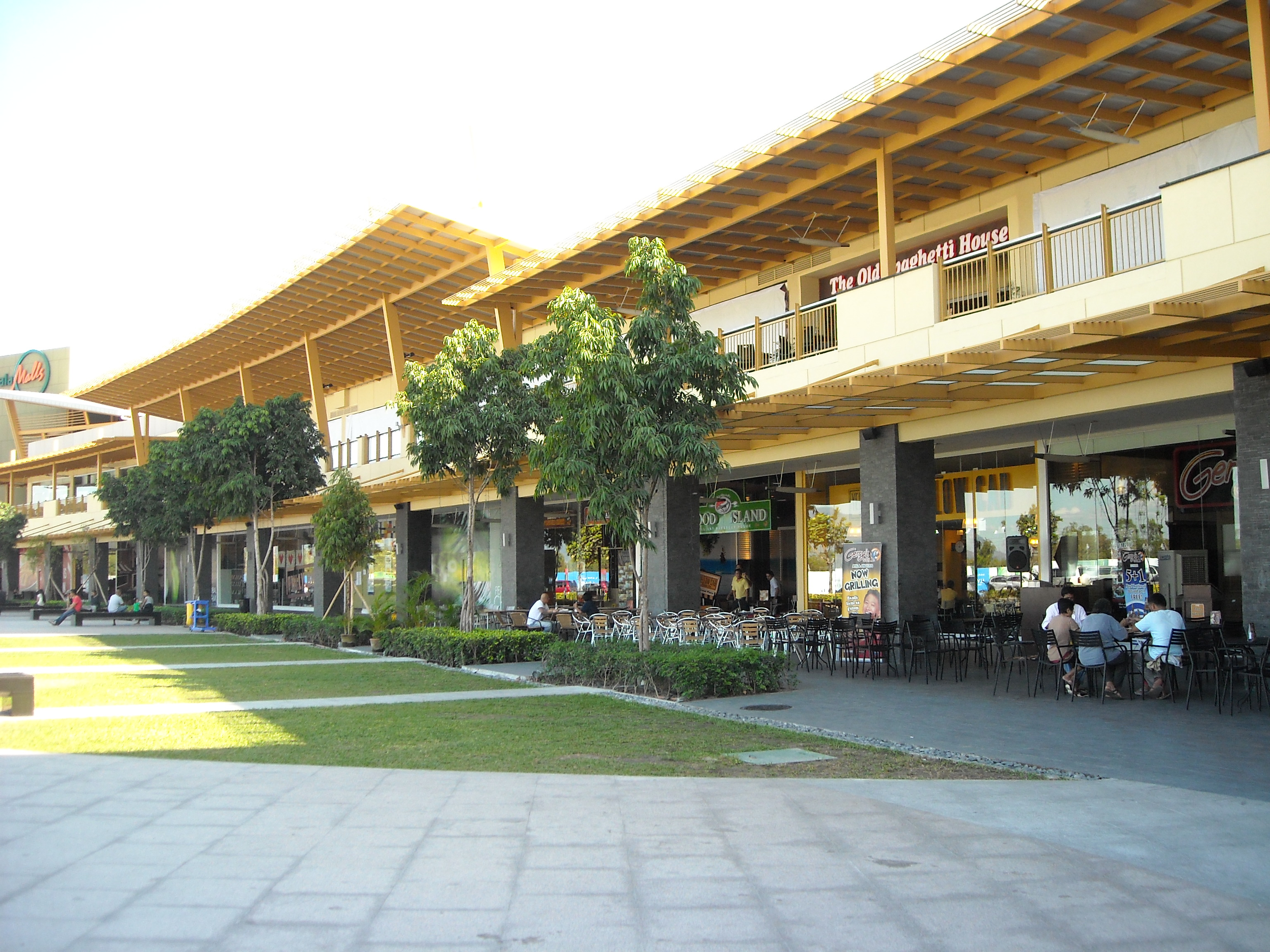
A series of restaurants at the mall's backside

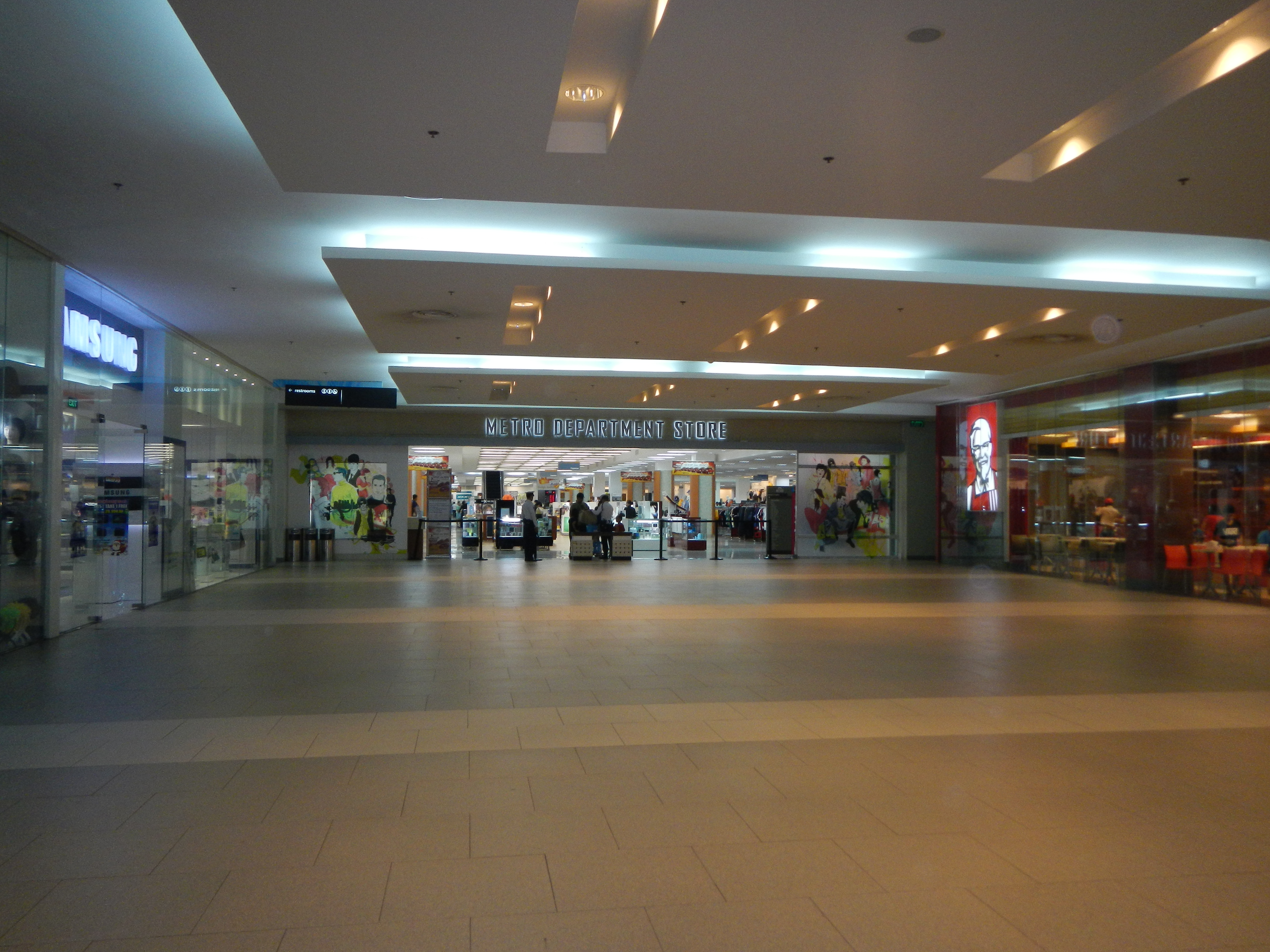
Metro Department Store

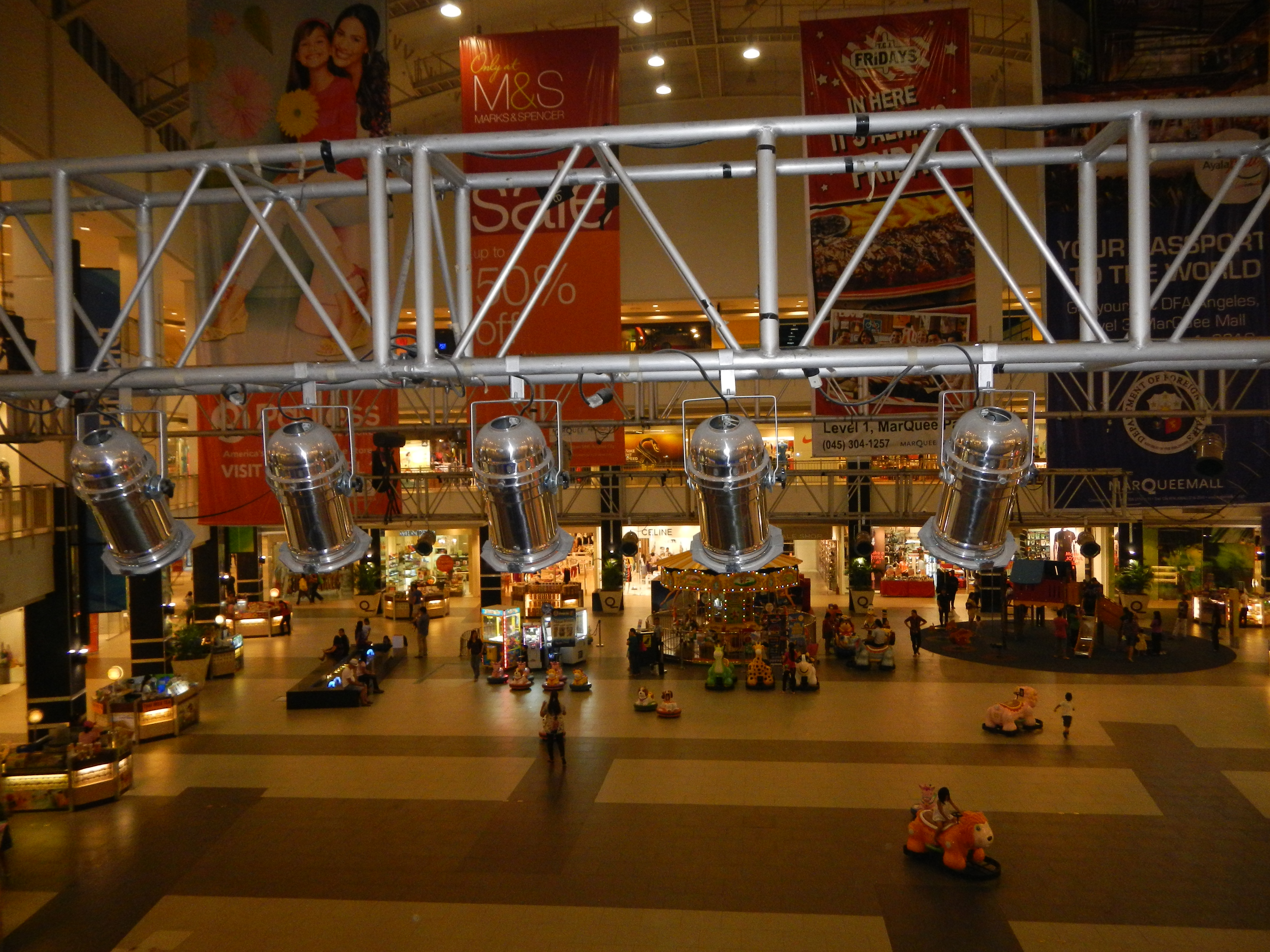
Interior

== In popular culture ==
- The mall is featured (as Tamol Mall) as the finale scene in the 2019 film The Mall, The Merrier.

== See also ==
- Abreeza
- Centrio Mall
- Ayala Malls
