= Angeles City =

Highly-urbanized city in Central Luzon, Philippines

- Highly urbanized city
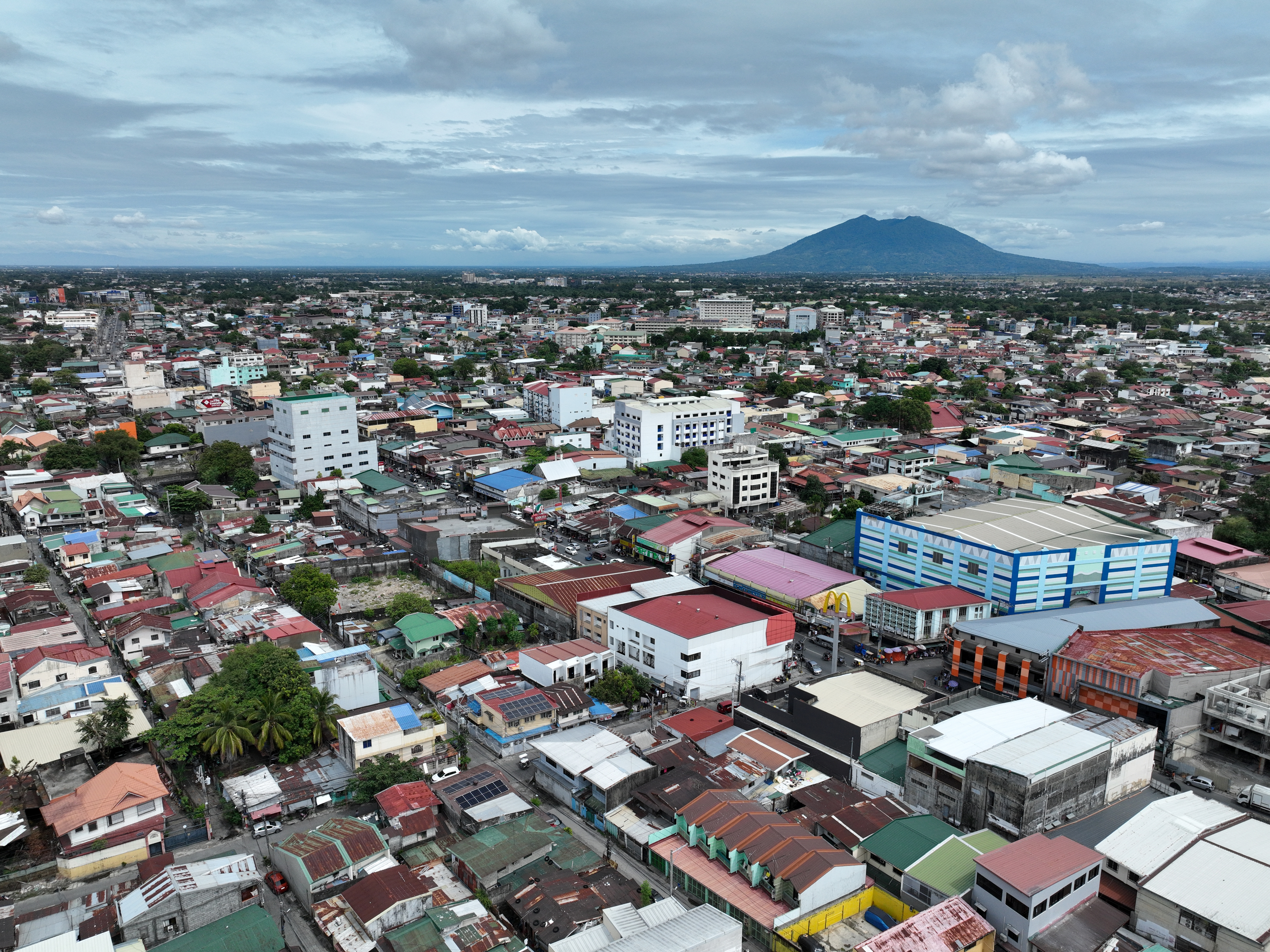
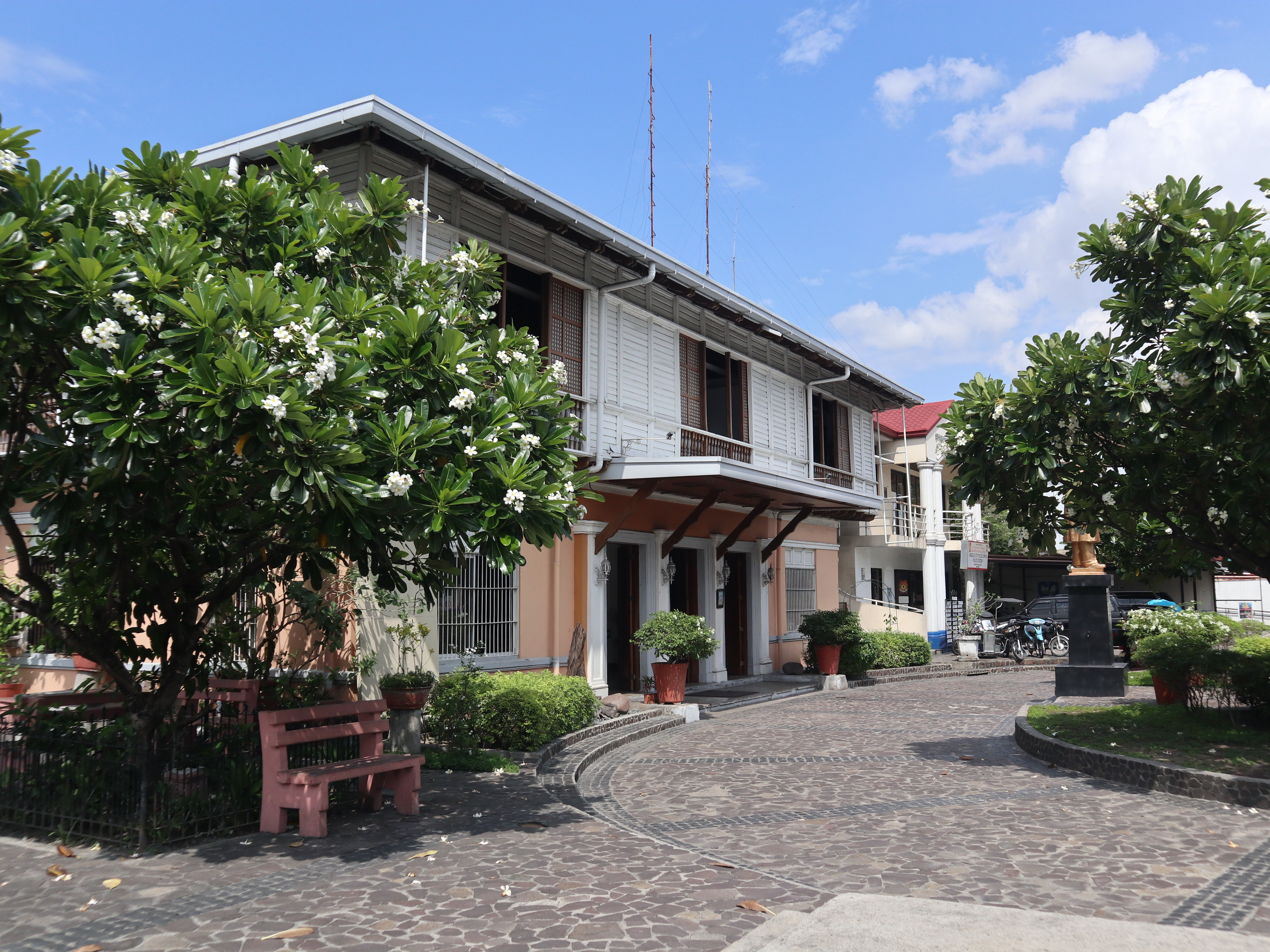
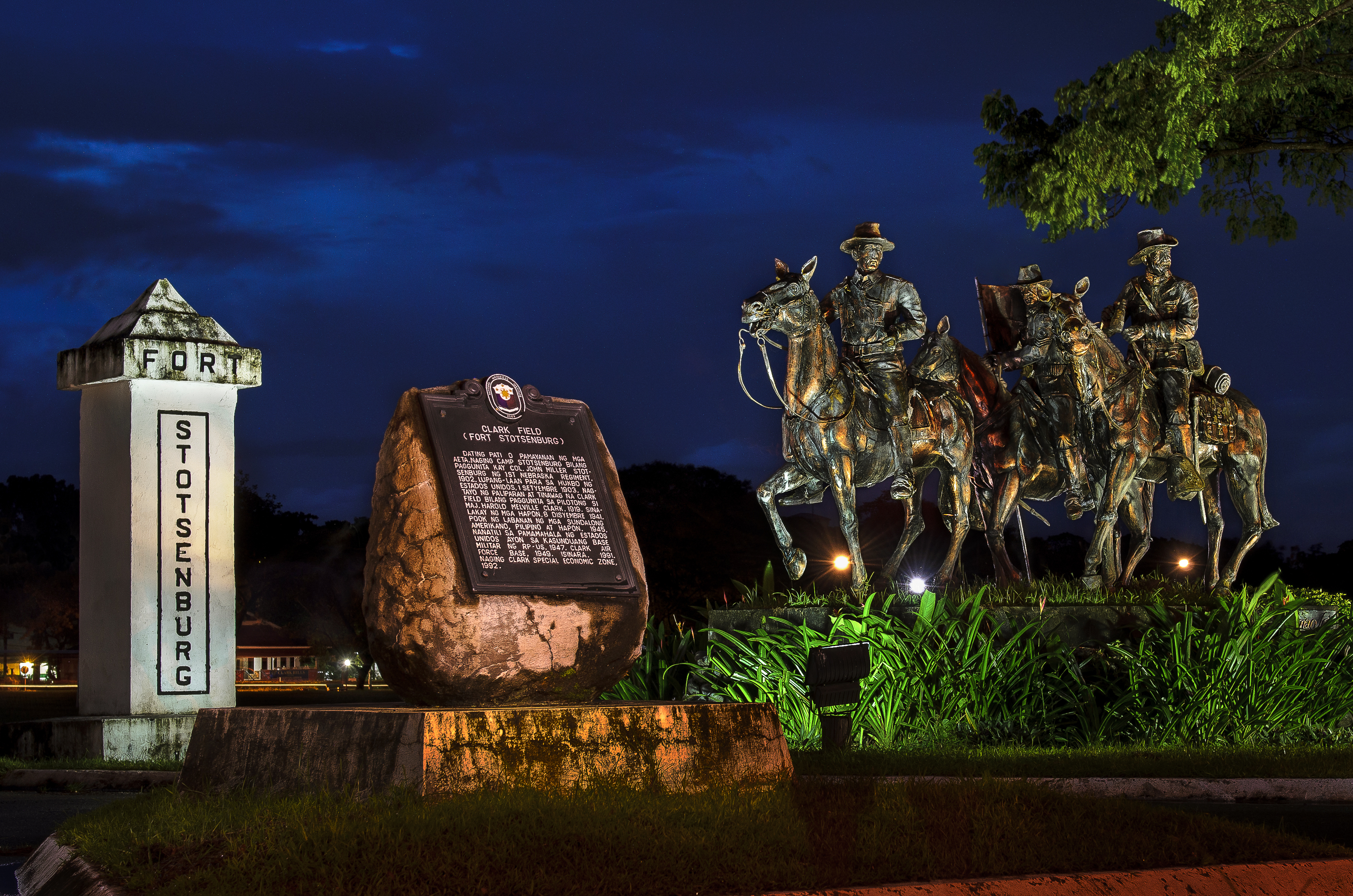
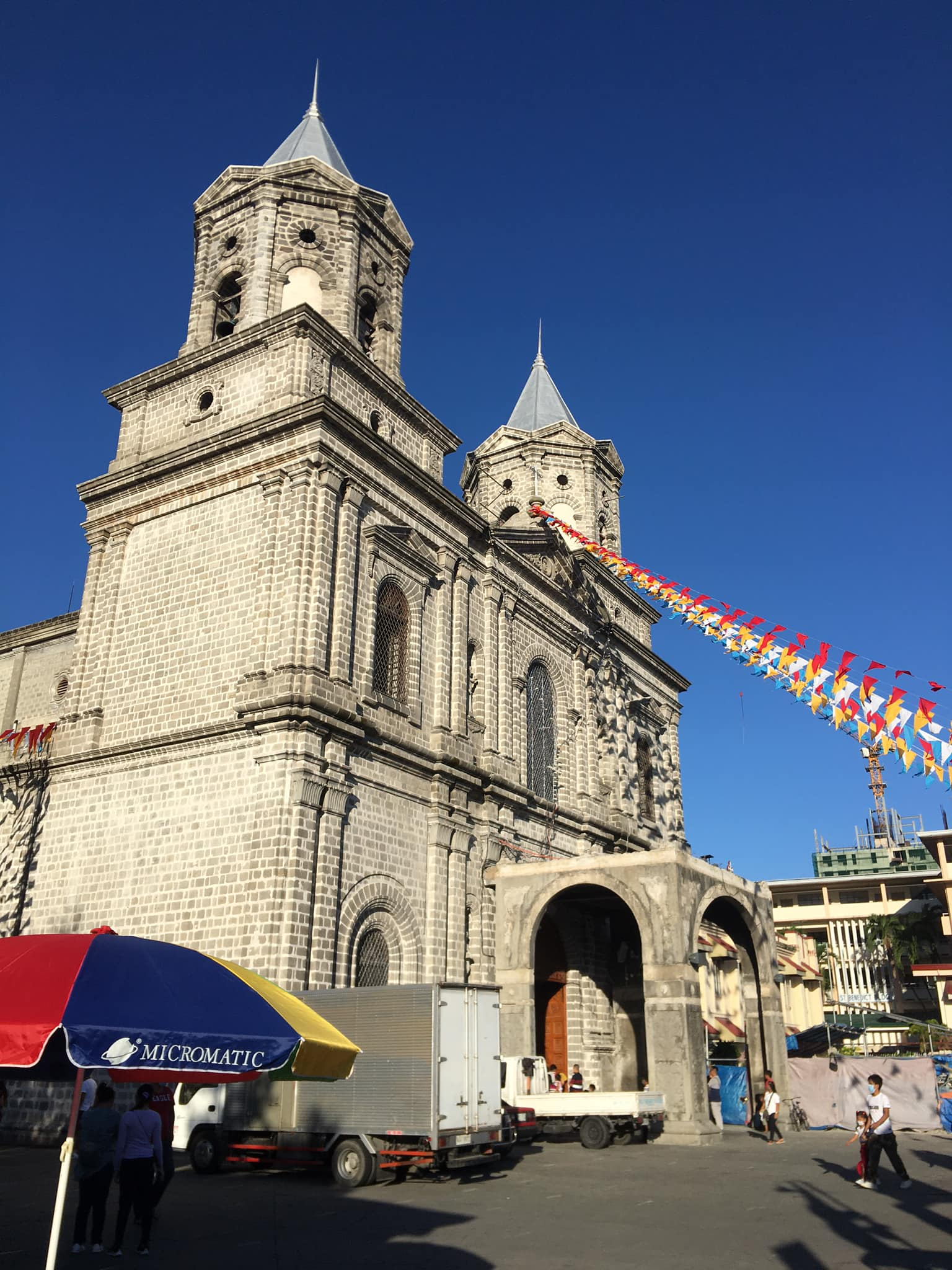
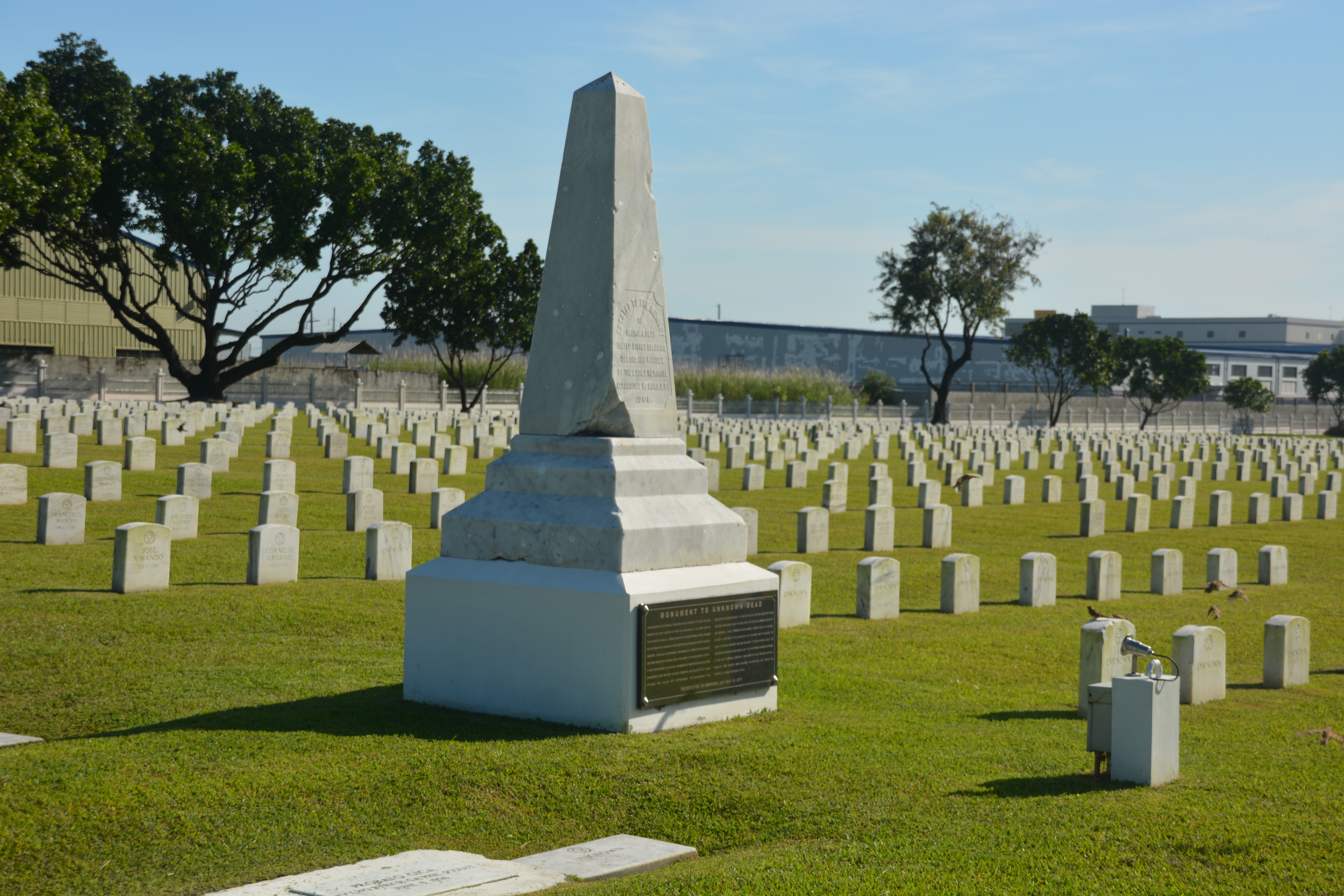
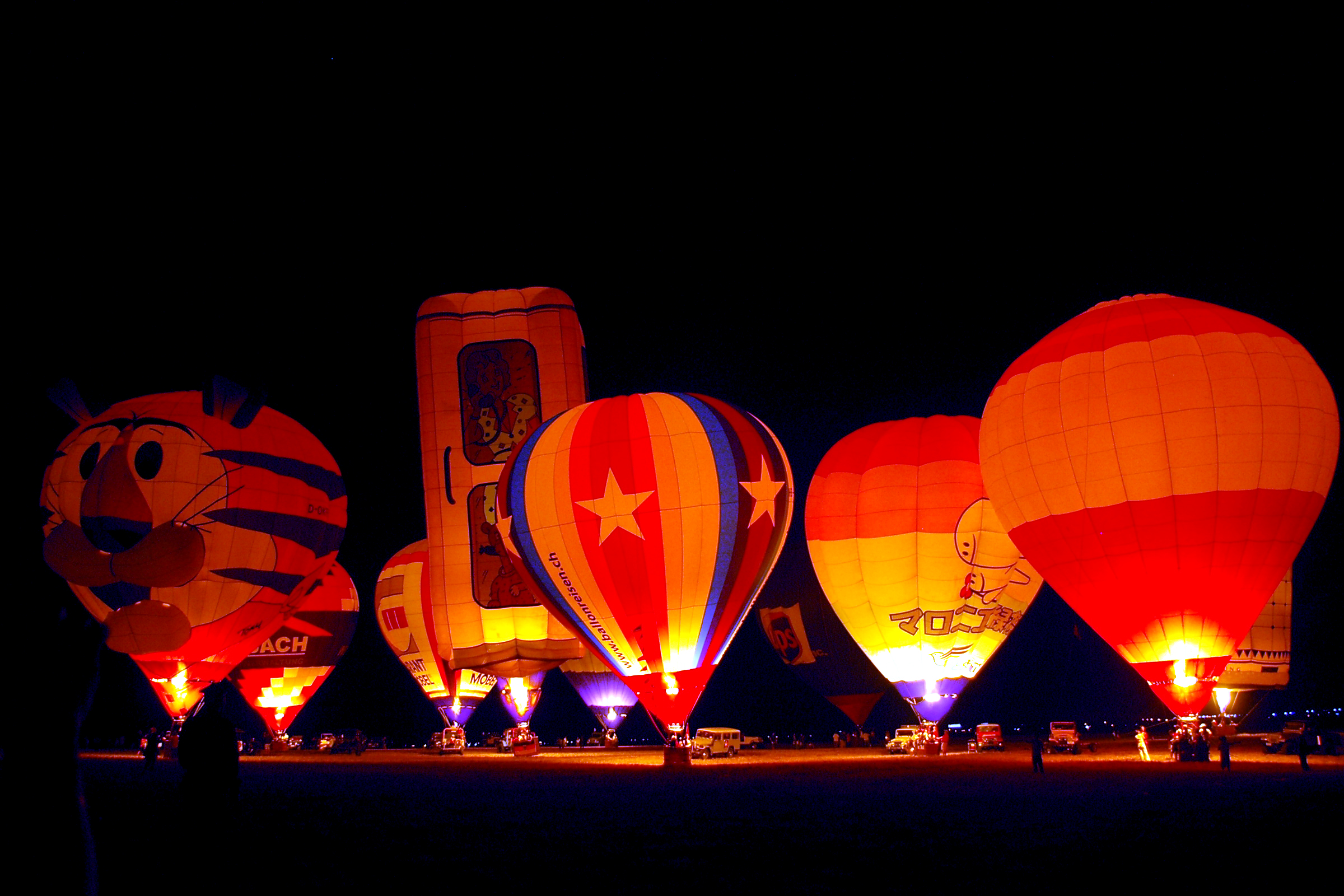
- From top to bottom, left to right: Angeles City skyline; Museo ning Angeles; Fort Stotsenburg; Holy Rosary Parish Church; Clark Veterans Cemetery; and Philippine International Hot Air Balloon Fiesta

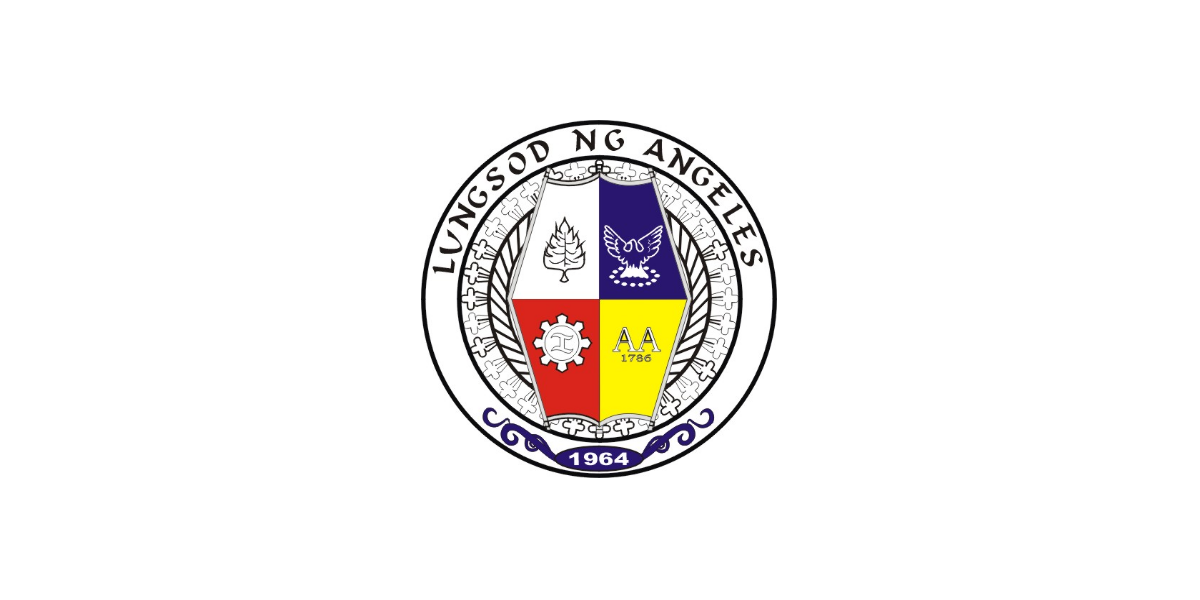
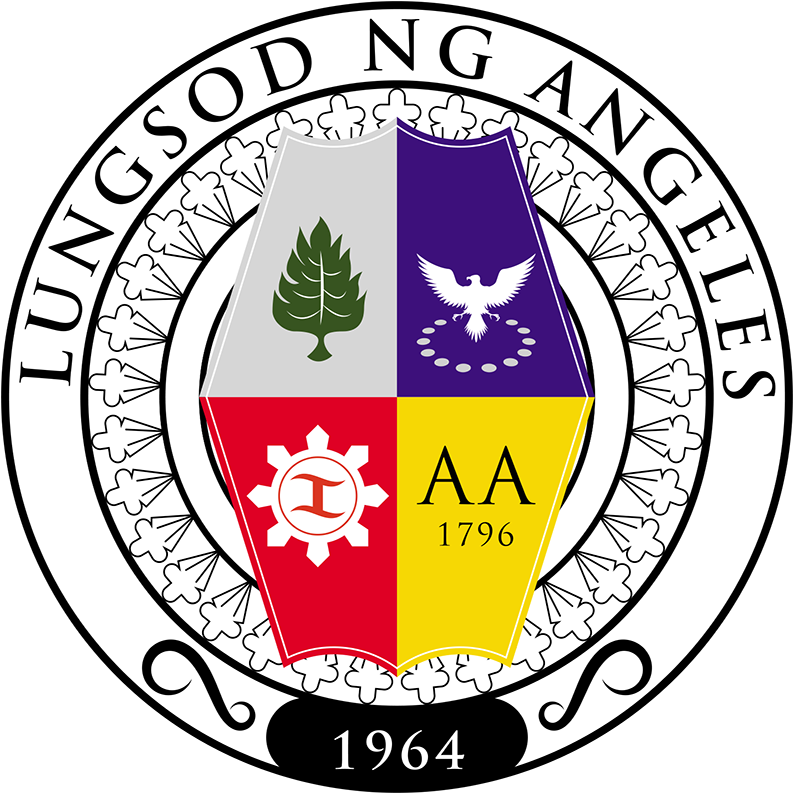
- Flag Seal
- Nickname(s): City of Angels; Asia's Emerging Culinary City Destination; Sisig Capital of the Philippines
- Motto(s): Kapampangan: "Sulagpo Ta Na!" (English: "Let's soar high now!")
- Anthem: Himno ning Angeles (Angeles Hymn)
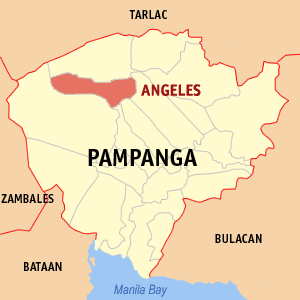
- Map of Central Luzon with Angeles City highlighted
- Interactive map of Angeles City
- Location within the Philippines
- Coordinates: 15°08′50″N 120°35′05″E
- Country: Philippines
- Region: Central Luzon
- Province: Pampanga (geographically only)
- District: 1st district
- Settled: 1796
- Chartered: December 8, 1829
- Cityhood: January 1, 1964
- Highly urbanized city: October 13, 1986
- Barangays: 33 (see Barangays)

Government
  - Type: Sangguniang Panlungsod
  - Mayor: Carmelo B. Lazatin II (Lakas)
  - Vice Mayor: Amos B. Rivera (PRP)
  - Representative: Carmelo G. Lazatin Jr. (PFP)
  - Councilors: List: Arvin M. Suller; Joan Crystal J. Parker-Aguas; Marino D. Bañola; Maricel Morales-Agoncillo; Edgardo G. Pamintuan Jr.; Jezreel Aaron L. Pineda; Alexander P. Indiongco; Michelle M. Bonifacio; Jeselle Ann V. Dayrit; Raco Paolo S. Del Rosario
  - Electorate: 211,775 voters (2025)

Area
  - Highly urbanized city: 63.37 km^{2} (24.47 sq mi)
- Elevation: 146 m (479 ft)
- Highest elevation: 604 m (1,982 ft)
- Lowest elevation: 32 m (105 ft)

Population (2024 census)
  - Highly urbanized city: 483,452
  - Density: 7,629/km^{2} (19,760/sq mi)
  - Metro: 1,834,563
  - Households: 116,343
- Demonyms: Angeleños (Male); Angeleñas (Female); Angeleneans

Economy
  - Income class: 1st city income class
  - Poverty incidence: 0.6% (2023)
  - Revenue: ₱ 3,480 million (2024)
  - Assets: ₱ 9,494 million (2024)
  - Expenditure: ₱ 3,071 million (2024)
  - Liabilities: ₱ 3,504 million (2024)

Service provider
  - Electricity: Angeles Electric Corporation (AEC)
- Time zone: UTC+8 (PST)
- ZIP code: 2009, 2024 (Balibago), 2023 (portions under Clark Freeport and Special Economic Zone)
- PSGC: 0330100000
- IDD : area code: +63 (0)45
- Native languages: Kapampangan; Tagalog
- Website: angelescity.gov.ph

Angeles (locally [ˈaŋhɛlɛs]), officially the City of Angeles (Kapampangan: Ciudad ning Angeles; Filipino: Lungsod ng Angeles), is a highly urbanized city in the Central Luzon region of the Philippines. It has a population of 483,452 people.

Angeles is the largest city of Pampanga. While politically independent from the province, it is usually grouped by the Philippine Statistics Authority therewith for statistical purposes.

Angeles City is the urban core of Metro Clark, an urban area in Pampanga. This area, also known as Metro Angeles, is considered the industrial and residential heartland of Central Luzon. Metro Clark-Angeles is also identified as a regional center by the national government.

== History ==
=== Spanish period ===
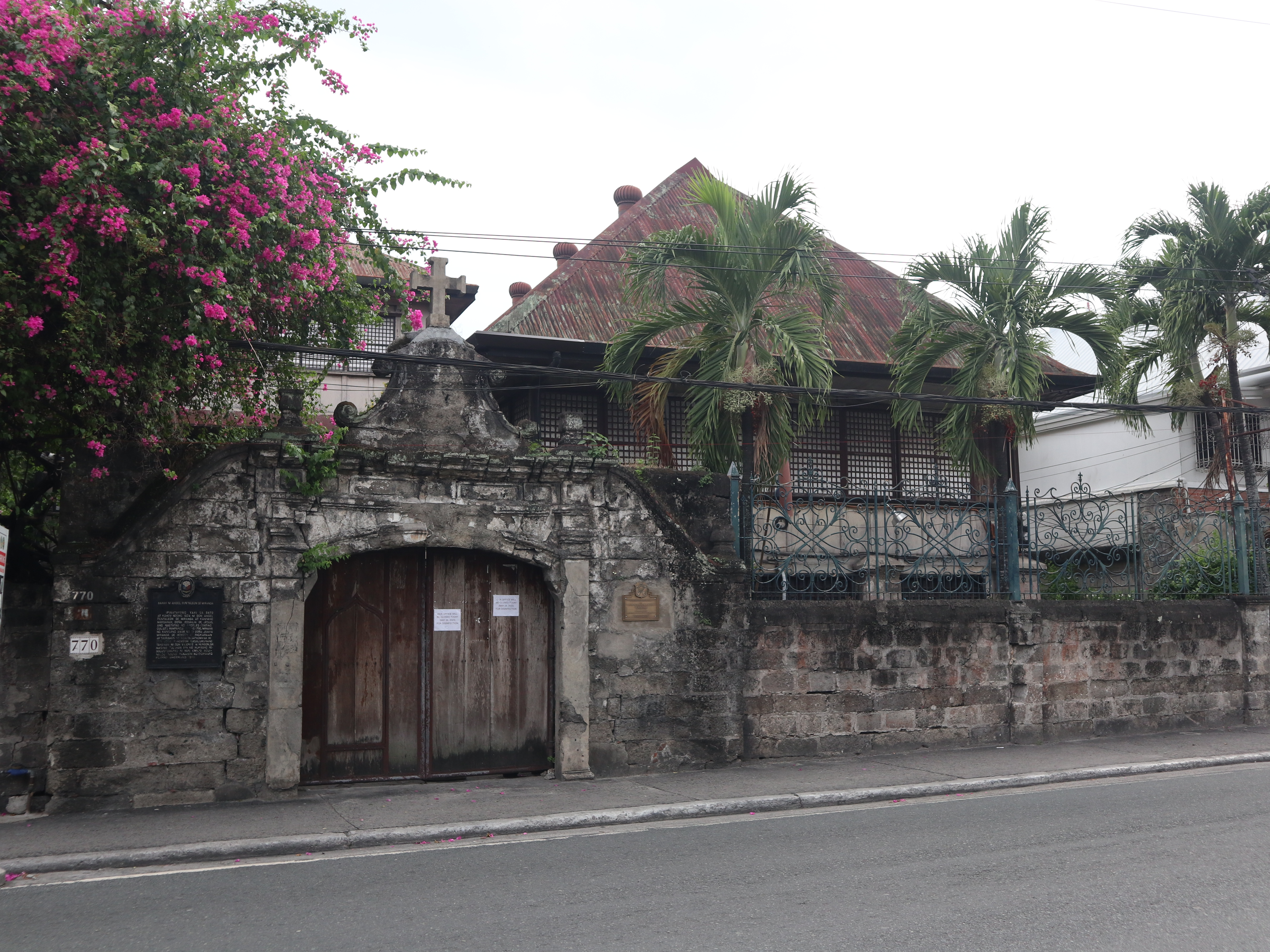
Pantaleon de Miranda House along Santo Rosario St.

In 1796, the gobernadorcillo or town head of San Fernando, Don Ángel Pantaleón de Miranda, and his wife, Doña Rosalía de Jesús, along with some followers, staked out a new settlement, which they named Culiát because of the abundance of vines (Gnetum indicum) of that name in the area. The new settlers cleared the woodland and cultivated the area for rice and sugar farming. Don Ángel built his first house with light materials at the northwest corner of the intersection of Sapang Balen and the road going towards the town of Porac. It was later donated to the Catholic Church and became a cemetery called "Campo Santong Matua" (today the site of Nepomuceno Coliseum).

On May 12, 1812, the new settlers tried to make Culiat a self-governing town but the friars resisted the move, led by Fray José Pometa. Ten years later, on February 11, 1822, Don Ángel filed a petition for the township of Culiat to secede from San Fernando, but it was denied. This was followed by another petition within the same year, jointly signed by Don Ángel, his son-in-law, Mariano Henson, and the latter's father, Severino Henson. He donated 35 hectares (86 acres) for the construction of the first Catholic church, a convent and a primary school while Doña Agustina Henson de Nepomuceno, the niece of who would become the first gobernadorcillo of Angeles in 1830, Don Ciriaco de Miranda, gave land for the new public market. Don Ángel paid the complete amount required by law just for the secession of Culiat from San Fernando. There were only 160 taxpayers then but the law required that it should have at least 500 taxpayers.

Located some 10 miles (16 km) north of Pampanga's capital, Culiat became a barrio of San Fernando for 33 years and on December 8, 1829, became a separate municipality. The newly autonomous town was renamed "El Pueblo de los Ángeles" in honor of its patron saints, the Holy Angels, and the name of its founder, Don Ángel, coinciding with the rise of new barrios such as Santo Cristo (as the población or town proper), Cutcut, Pampang, and Pulong Anunas. The progressive barrios developed some new industries such as a sugar mill and a wine distillery. The transition of Angeles from a jungle clearing to a barrio, to a town and finally to a city took 168 years and in all that time, it survived locusts' infestations, wars, epidemics, volcanic eruptions and typhoons to become one of the fast rising towns in the country. When it received its first official municipal charter, the town contained some 661 people, 151 houses and an area of 38.65 km^{2}.

On May 7, 1899, General Emilio Aguinaldo transferred the seat of the First Philippine Republic to Angeles. It then became the site of celebrations for the first anniversary of Philippine independence, which was proclaimed a year earlier in Kawit, Cavite. Events included a parade, led by the youngest ever Filipino generals, Gregorio del Pilar and Manuel Tinio, with General Aguinaldo viewing the proceedings from the Pamintuan Residence, which was the Presidential Palace from May to July 1899 (and later was the Central Bank of the Philippines office in Central Luzon, before its ownership passed to the National Historical Commission of the Philippines). Aguinaldo's sojourn was short, however, for in July of this same year he transferred his government to the province of Tarlac following Angeles' occupation by the American forces.

=== American period ===
On August 10, 1899, U.S. forces began the attack on Angeles confident in capturing it in a few days. However, the Filipino Army defending the town refused to give in so easily and fiercely fought back and for three months, they battled the Americans in and around the town. It was only after the battle on November 5, 1899, that the town finally fell into American hands. The Battle of Angeles was considered to be the longest in the history of the Filipino-American War in Pampanga. This led to the establishment of an American camp in Barrio Talimundoc (in what is now Lourdes Sur), located next to the railroad station, in order to establish control over the central plains of Luzon. In January 1900, General Frederick D. Grant organized the first U.S. Civil Government in Angeles by appointing an alcalde or municipal mayor, beginning American rule over Angeles.

In 1902, the United States Army studied relocating their post from Barrio Talimundoc to a fertile plain in Barrio Sapang Bato, which supposedly had better grass for their horses. A year after that, U.S. President Theodore Roosevelt signed an executive order on September 1, establishing 7,700 acres (31 km^{2}) of land in Sapang Bato as Fort Stotsenburg (which later would expand to 156,204 acres (632.14 km^{2}) in 1908 to become Clark Air Base). It was centered on what would in later years become Clark Air Base's parade ground.

The Americans quickly commandeered Holy Rosary Parish Church and converted it into an army hospital, with the choir loft served as a dental clinic. The convento, which now houses Holy Family Academy, was the barracks for medical officers and enlisted men. The sacristy was the only portion where Angeleños could hear Mass. When the Americans finally vacated the church in 1904 and relocated to Fort Stotsenburg, parish priest Rev. Vicente Lapus listed a total of US$638 for portions of the church destroyed, looted church items and treasures, and arrears on rentals.

=== World War II ===
Hours after the attack on Pearl Harbor, Japan attacked the Philippines, targeting the American military presence, as well as the Philippine Army, and taking over the civilian government. During the Japanese occupation in the country, 57,000 Filipino and American prisoners of war passed the town of Angeles. They were forced to join the Bataan Death March, going to Camp O'Donnell in Capas, Tarlac. Angeleños showed their sympathy by handing them food, milk, boiled eggs, rice cakes, cigarettes, and water. Angeleños followed them up to the train station in Dau railway station in Mabalacat to give moral and spiritual support, and even helped the escapees.

War historians considered the bombing of Fort Stotsenburg on December 8, 1941, at 12:30 p.m. as one of the most destructive air raids in World War II, because almost all the American war planes were wrecked on the ground. In thirty minutes, the air might of the United States in the Far East was completely destroyed.

On the early morning of New Year's Day 1942, the first Japanese troops entered Angeles; they would occupy it until January 1945. During the Japanese invasion, another type of local government was set up on January 22, 1942. During the Japanese occupation, Clark Air Base then became a major center for staging Japanese air operations. Japanese aircraft flying out of Clark participated in the Battle of Leyte Gulf, considered to be the largest naval battle of the Second World War and possibly the largest naval battle in history.

Clark Air Base was recaptured by the Americans in January 1945, after three months of fierce fighting in the Philippines. After three years of atrocities committed by Japanese forces, the town and the rest of the Philippines were finally liberated by the combined United States and Philippine Commonwealth troops in 1945. The building of the general headquarters of the Philippine Commonwealth Army and Philippine Constabulary was situated in Angeles from January 1945 to June 1946, during and after World War II.

=== Postwar Era ===
==== Economic conditions ====
In the years after the second world war, Angeles City faced issues with poverty and unequal land ownership, particularly the unequal distribution of agricultural land. This was not limited to Angeles City but was also prevalent throughout Central Luzon. Difficult socioeconomic conditions were experienced by farmers, including land inequality and the challenges they faced in improving their circumstances. These conditions demonstrate that rural poverty was deeply rooted in structural inequalities that required meaningful economic and agricultural reforms. During and after Martial Law, however, land inequality and rural poverty remained persistent problems, as agrarian reform efforts failed to bring about substantial changes in land ownership for many farmers.

==== Clark Air Base ====
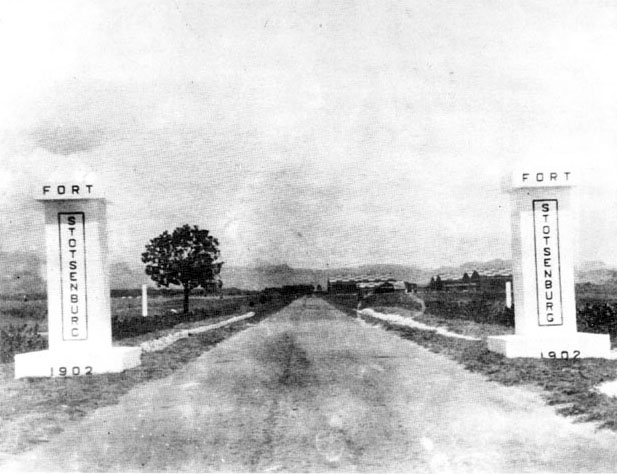
Fort Stotsenberg Gate Posts

After World War II, the Philippines gained independence from the United States on July 4, 1946, but then would be tied to a neo-colonial relationship. The "Treaty of General Relations" signed on independence day itself signified the Americans' withdrawal and surrender of possession, control and sovereignty over the Philippines, except the use of their bases. It was followed by the Philippine-American Military Bases Agreement on March 14, 1947, allowing the U.S. to maintain territorial integrity and sovereignty over Clark Air Base and Subic Naval Base for the next 44 years. Clark occupied 63,103 hectares and served as the tactical operational U.S. air force installation in the entire Southeast Asian region that had the capacity to accommodate the U.S. military transport planes, which served the entire Western Pacific.

In May, 1949, the facilities at Fort Stotsenburg and Clark Field were given to the U.S. Air Force, and the entire base became known as Clark Air Base. Many Americans eventually chose to settle permanently in Angeles, especially in Balibago.

Notably, Angeles City also became a city while living next to a major U.S. air base. The base shaped its economy, its nightlife, and even its security, such as the 1968 curfew. In the 1940s and 50s, only three bars stood outside the main gate. But, by the early 1960s, Fields Avenue was lined with them, and by the 1970s there were over 150 bars and similar establishments.

The base’s role in the wider world grew too. Clark entered the Vietnam War effort in March 1964. In 1966, an exchange of notes between Dean Rusk and Narciso Ramos set the bases agreement to remain in force for 25 years from September 16, 1966, which the Supreme Court later described as shortening the term to a total of 44 years, or until 1991. Two years later, attacks on American servicemen in August 1968 led to a curfew on both Clark and Angeles.

==== Cityhood ====
Angeles, despite its proximity to the American camp, did not progress fast and remained fairly small until the end of World War II. It was finally inaugurated on January 1, 1964, as a chartered city under Republic Act No. 3700 and then proceeded to enter a period of tremendous growth that resulted in its present position as the "Premier City in Central Luzon". It was through Mayor Rafael del Rosario's brainchild that Angeles became a city. He gained the distinction of being the last municipal mayor of Angeles. He was assisted in the preparation of the City Chapter by Attorney Enrique Tayag, a prominent resident of the town. Congresswoman Juanita Nepomuceno of the first district of Pampanga sponsored the bill in Congress, which was approved by then President Diosdado Macapagal, the ninth Philippine president and a native of the province of Pampanga.

==== The Hukbalahap ====
After the war, the Hukbalahap, or the Huks, a Filipino guerrilla group formed during World War II to fight the Japanese, became the Hukbong Mapagpalaya ng Bayan, or HMB. It later turned into an anti-government communist movement and carried out coordinated raids in 1950, including attacks in Pampanga. The government fought back with an aggressive anti-Huk campaign led by Defense Secretary Ramon Magsaysay, which eventually weakened and split the movement.

==== Kumander Sumulong ====
By the 1950s, after the Huks had lost much of their strength, Faustino “Kumander Sumulong” del Mundo ran a powerful shadow government and set up his headquarters in Angeles City. From there, he built influence over local politicians, police appointments, and businesses. He collected protection money from black market operations around Clark Air Base that gave him a political clout. Politicians, including Ferdinand Marcos, reportedly sought his support in secret, making Sumulong one of the most powerful figures in the city. But his grip began to weaken when Bernabe “Kumander Dante” Buscayno left him and joined Jose Ma. Sison and the New People’s Army, while Pampanga Governor Apung Quitong Nepomuceno convinced the Philippine Constabulary to move against him.

==== Last years of the third republic ====
By 1972, Angeles was a newly chartered city whose economy depended on a foreign base whose future had been negotiated without local input. These economic and social issues formed part of the broader conditions in Central Luzon during the years leading up to Martial Law. Alongside the political tensions and social unrest of the early 1970s, they reflected the challenges faced by communities in the province during a period of significant political and economic change.

=== Martial Law Era ===
==== Clark Air Base controversies ====
Due to its proximity to the capital and the presence of Clark Air Base, Pampanga, particularly Angeles and neighboring Mabalacat, became one of the flashpoint of social upheavals of the early 1970s and the ensuing dictatorship of Ferdinand Marcos. Even during the first demonstrations of the First Quarter Storm in 1970, Clark and the other US Bases in the Philippines were a major issue for protesters, who saw them as a continuation of the US' colonial hegemony, and a way of dragging the Philippines into the cold war, since Clark had become a staging point for the increasingly unpopular Vietnam War.

1970 saw a major diplomatic incident at Clark Air Base in what US Presidential Assistant for National Security Affairs Henry Kissinger eventually called "the Williams Case." In June 1970, Angeles City Court of First Instance Ceferino Gaddi ordered the arrest of Base Commander Colonel Averill Holman and Base Chief of International Law Lt. Col. Raymond Hodges, citing in contempt for allowing the transfer of US Air Force Staff Sergeant Bernard Willams to the US in November 1969 despite the fact that he had been arraigned in the Angeles Court in August 1969 on criminal charges of abduction and attempted rape. Williams was eventually returned to the Philippines, although the Marcos administration refused to enforce the court ordered arrests against Holman and Hodges. The incident helped the push for the renegotiation of the US-Philippines Bases Treaty in 1979, in an effort to clarify the issue of Philippine sovereignty and jurisdiction over the bases.

In 1971, unfair labor practices led the civilian workers at the base to stage a three-day strike which began on March 3, followed by a half-month strike which began on July 25. The Federation of Filipino Civilian Employees Associations would organize further major strikes in 1979, 1983, and in March 1986.

==== Sapang Bato protester murders ====
Among the well documented human rights abuses of the Marcos dictatorship were the killings and/or enforced disappearances of activists and protesters. In Angeles, one notable incident was the murder of close friends Pepito Deheran, Rolando Castro and Lito Cabrera while they were sleeping in Cabrera's property in Sapang Bato, Angeles. They were attacked, captured, and tortured by Marcos' Civilian Home Defense Force militia forces simply because they participated in the protest movement that grew out of the assassination of opposition leader Ninoy Aquino. Deheran managed to escape the ordeal alive and was taken to the hospital, where he was able to identify his assailants. But he was stabbed by unknown attackers while in his own hospital bed. Castro, Cabrera, and Deheran would later be honored by having their names inscribed on the wall of remembrance of the Philippines' Bantayog ng mga Bayani, which honors the martyrs and heroes who dared to resist the dictatorship.

==== Political alignments ====
During the 1971 Philippine local elections, former Governor Rafael Lazatin of the Nacionalista Party won the mayoralty in Angeles City. After the declaration of Martial Law, he ended up holding the post until the 1980 Philippine local elections, where he decided to retire, and fielded his son as candidate instead. The elections went to Liberal Party candidate Francisco Nepomuceno, who became one of only six City Mayors to win that year who were not aligned with Ferdinand Marcos' Kilusang Bagong Lipunan.] After the EDSA Revolution and the establishment of the Provisional Government of the Philippines (1986–1987) newly installed President Corazon Aquino decided to retain Nepomuceno as Mayor instead of appointing an OIC Mayor, since Nepomuceno was already a part of the political opposition to Marcos.

=== Mount Pinatubo eruption ===
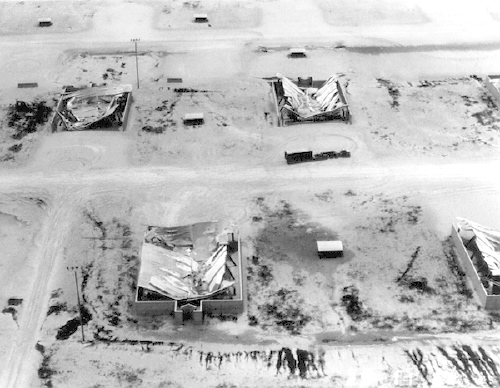
Collapsed hangars at the Clark Air Base after the 1991 eruption of Mount Pinatubo

On June 15, 1991, Angeles was affected by the cataclysmic eruption of nearby Mount Pinatubo, with up to 60,000 people being evacuated from the city. It was the second-largest volcanic eruption of the twentieth century and, by far, the largest eruption to affect a densely populated area. The province of Pampanga, Clark specifically, was badly hit and the agricultural lands, as well as other businesses, were covered by tons of lahar. There were no casualties reported inside Clark two days from the initial eruption because the 18,000 personnel and their families were transported to Guam and the Subic Naval Base in Zambales.

The eruption of Mount Pinatubo forced the leadership of the U.S. to prematurely abandon its military installation at Clark Air Base. This was in addition to a vote by the Philippine Senate in 1991 to no longer extend the Laurel–Langley Agreement, which allowed the presence of U.S. military forces on Philippine territory, thus ending the long chapter of Filipino-American relations in the history of Angeles. The U.S. military never returned to Clark, turning over the damaged base to the Philippine government on November 26, 1991.

=== Establishment of the Clark Special Economic Zone ===
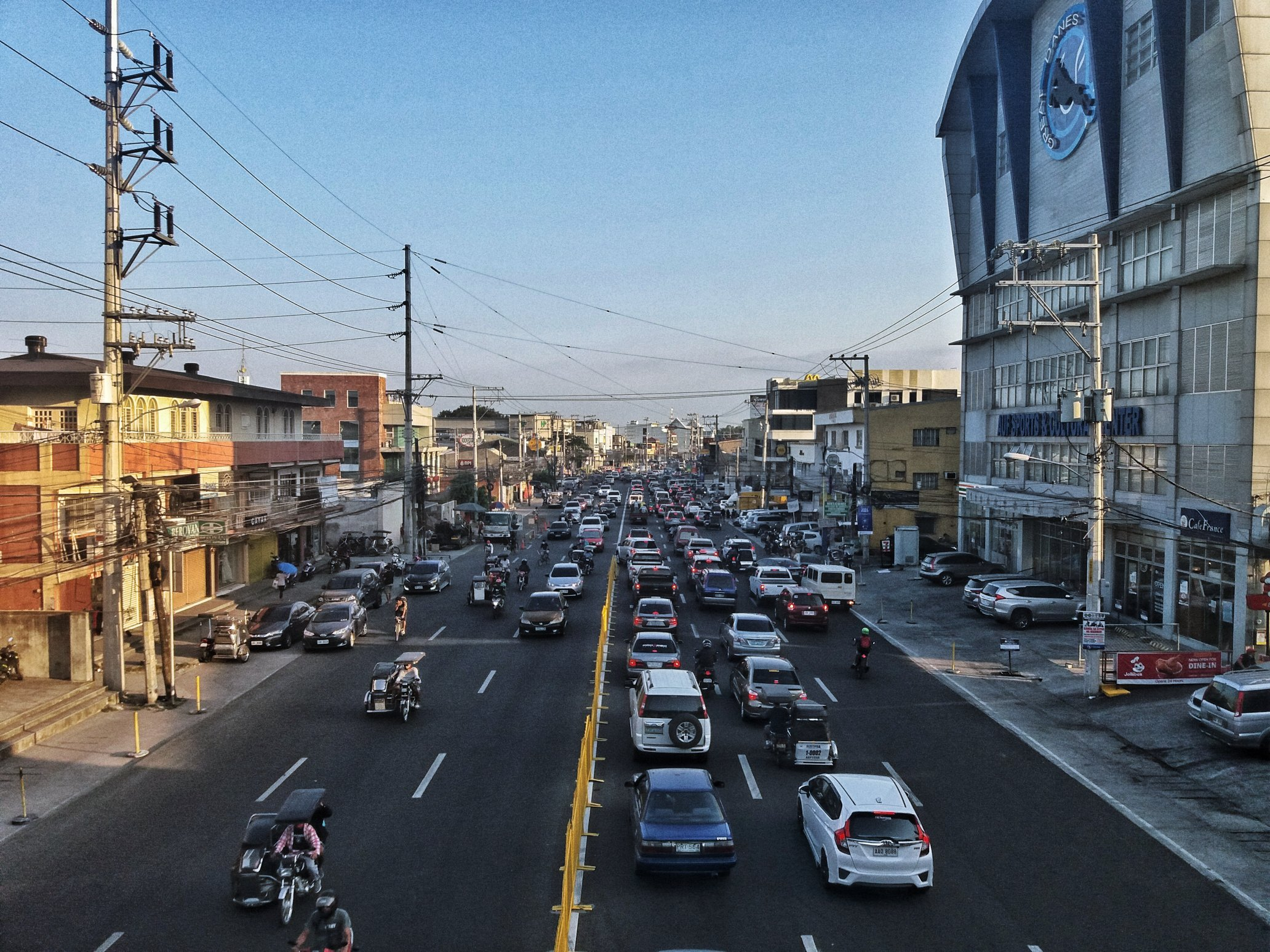
MacArthur Highway at Angeles. The neighboring city San Fernando is southbound of the highway.

In 1993, cleanup and removal of volcanic ash deposits began. The former base re-emerged as Clark Special Economic Zone (CSEZ) approved by then President Fidel V. Ramos on April 3 of the same year. The airfield infrastructure was improved and destined to be the premiere airport in the country in the next five years and one of the most modern in Asia. The creation of CSEZ has helped to offset the loss of income and jobs previously generated by the presence of the U.S. base. Today, Angeles and Clark together form the hub for business, industry, aviation and tourism, as well as the entertainment and gaming center of Central Luzon.

Among the draws for tourists is the local dish sisig which according to the Center for Kapampangan Studies, originated in this Angeles and has been on the menu since the 1730s. Pampanga is well known as the culinary center of the Philippines.

=== Contemporary history ===
In 2018, Angeles applied to be a UNESCO Creative City, while it also applied sisig into the UNESCO List of Intangible Cultural Heritage. The applications are currently being processed by UNESCO.

On May 31, 2022, 848 Aeta families belonging to the Ayta Mag-indi and Ayta Mag-antsi groups were issued their Certificate of Ancestral Domain Title (CADT) by the National Commission on Indigenous Peoples, after the title was approved in 2009. The CADT covers the Pampanga towns of Camias, Diaz, Inararo, Villa Maria and Sapang Uwak in Porac; Sapang Bato in Angeles City; and parts of Floridablanca. The CADT also includes San Marcelino town in Zambales.

In November 2025, 2,000 people marched from the Nepo Complex to Henson corner Valdez streets to protest massive government corruption in the flood control projects scandal. Youth groups, workers, civic organizations, church leaders, and business sector representatives took part in the protest.

In September 2026, activists marched to Clark Freeport Zone at Barangay Balibago in Angeles City to protest the Pax Silica initiative, which will build a 1,600-hectare artificial intelligence (AI) data hub in New Clark City. The protesters cited the impact the data hub will have on farmers, Indigenous groups, the environment, and national sovereignty.

A recent racial study showed that Angeles City, Pampanga; alongside Manila; and Olongapo, Zambales; was the locations of several concentrations of 250,000 Amerasians (Mixed American-Asians) who were born as a result of the American colonization of the Philippines and the presence of US bases in the country.

== Geography ==
It is bordered by Mabalacat to the north, Mexico to the east, San Fernando to the southeast, Bacolor to the south, and Porac to the southwest and west. Though the city administers itself autonomously from Pampanga, it is the province's commercial and financial hub.

Angeles is served by Clark International Airport in Clark Freeport Zone.

Angeles is 83 kilometres (52 mi) from Manila and 17 kilometres (11 mi) from the provincial capital, San Fernando.

=== Climate ===
Climate data for Angeles City (Clark International Airport) 1997–2020, extremes 1997–2020
Month	Jan	Feb	Mar	Apr	May	Jun	Jul	Aug	Sep	Oct	Nov	Dec	Year
Record high °C (°F)	33.5 (92.3)	34.9 (94.8)	36.5 (97.7)	37.1 (98.8)	38.3 (100.9)	37.5 (99.5)	36.0 (96.8)	35.4 (95.7)	35.1 (95.2)	34.2 (93.6)	34.0 (93.2)	34.0 (93.2)	38.3 (100.9)
Mean daily maximum °C (°F)	30.0 (86.0)	30.9 (87.6)	32.5 (90.5)	34.0 (93.2)	33.3 (91.9)	31.9 (89.4)	30.8 (87.4)	30.3 (86.5)	30.8 (87.4)	31.2 (88.2)	31.1 (88.0)	30.4 (86.7)	31.4 (88.5)
Daily mean °C (°F)	25.5 (77.9)	26.0 (78.8)	27.5 (81.5)	28.9 (84.0)	28.8 (83.8)	28.0 (82.4)	27.3 (81.1)	27.0 (80.6)	27.2 (81.0)	27.3 (81.1)	27.0 (80.6)	26.3 (79.3)	27.2 (81.0)
Mean daily minimum °C (°F)	21.0 (69.8)	21.1 (70.0)	22.4 (72.3)	23.8 (74.8)	24.4 (75.9)	24.1 (75.4)	23.7 (74.7)	23.7 (74.7)	23.6 (74.5)	23.4 (74.1)	23.0 (73.4)	22.1 (71.8)	23.0 (73.4)
Record low °C (°F)	15.8 (60.4)	16.9 (62.4)	17.9 (64.2)	19.5 (67.1)	19.8 (67.6)	20.8 (69.4)	21.1 (70.0)	21.7 (71.1)	20.0 (68.0)	18.1 (64.6)	17.4 (63.3)	17.0 (62.6)	15.8 (60.4)
Average rainfall mm (inches)	13.6 (0.54)	16.3 (0.64)	52.5 (2.07)	60.6 (2.39)	196.1 (7.72)	254.1 (10.00)	514.6 (20.26)	695.1 (27.37)	305.5 (12.03)	201.6 (7.94)	97.0 (3.82)	47.5 (1.87)	2,454.5 (96.63)
Average rainy days (≥ 1.0 mm)	3	3	3	5	13	16	20	22	18	11	7	5	126
Average relative humidity (%)	70	68	66	65	74	80	84	86	84	78	75	73	75
Source: PAGASA

Under the Köppen climate classification system, Angeles has a tropical savanna climate that borders on a tropical monsoon climate (Köppen climate classification Aw/Am). Angeles experiences two distinct seasons: a dry season from November through April, with a wet season from May through October. From 1953 to 1991, the mean daily low was 22.6 °C and the mean daily high was 31.3 °C, with June being warmest and January and February being the coolest. The average annual rainfall is 2026.8 mm. Typhoons tend to approach from the east during the summer and fall. Many damaging storms struck the city, including Typhoon Irma on November 28, 1974 (generally considered to be the strongest one); Typhoon Rita on October 27, 1978; Typhoon Irma (the name was reused) on November 24, 1981; Typhoon Ruby on October 25, 1988; and Typhoon Yunya on June 15, 1991, which coincided with the Mount Pinatubo blast. In July 1972, Central Luzon experienced a month of nearly continuous rain, resulting in ±2,440 millimetres (96 in) falling on the plain around Angeles.

=== Barangays ===
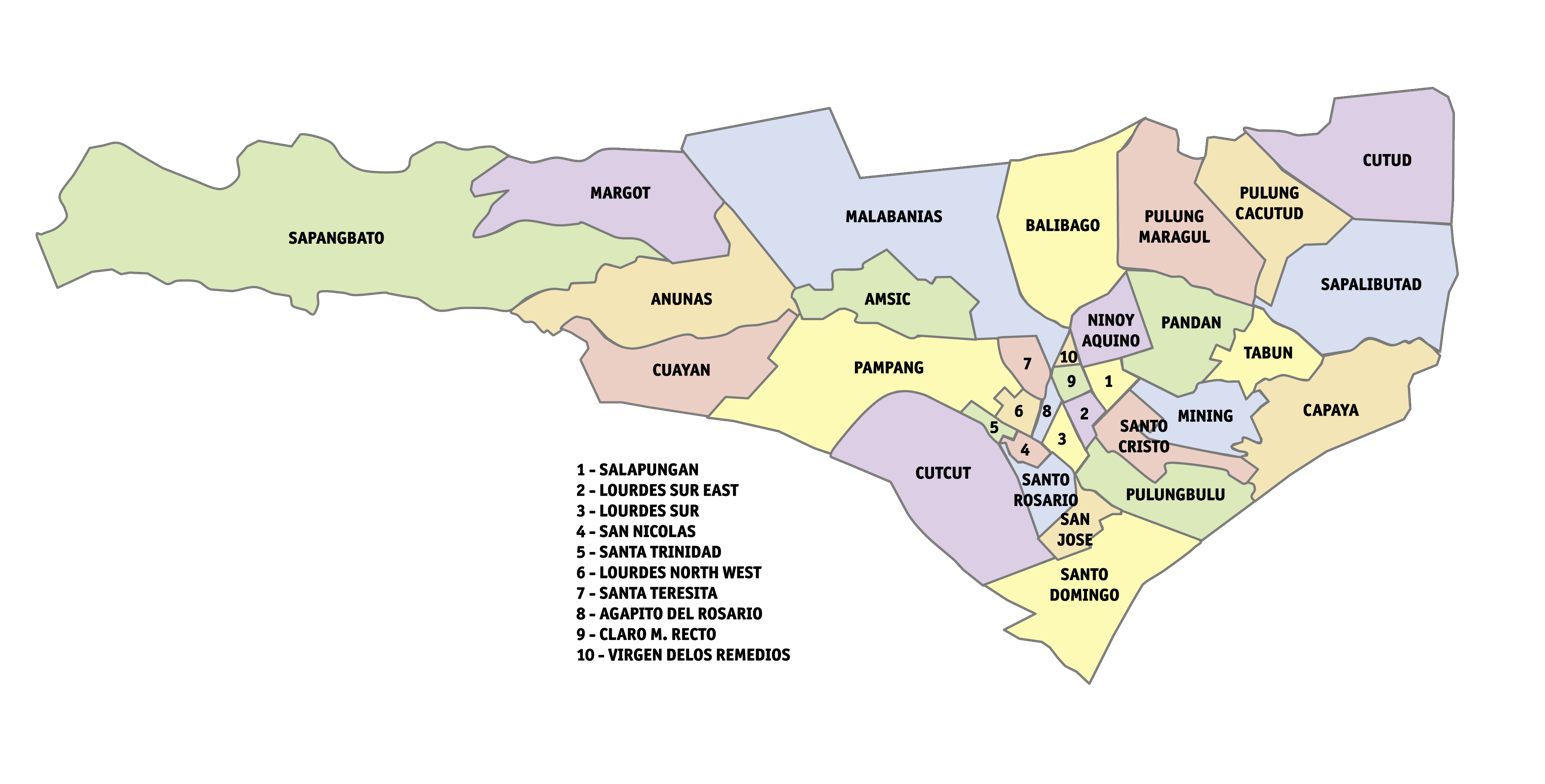
Political map of Angeles

Angeles is divided into 33 barangays. Each barangay consists of puroks and some have sitios.

- Agapito del Rosario
- Amsic
- Anunas
- Balibago
- Capaya
- Claro M. Recto
- Cuayan
- Cutcut
- Cutud
- Lourdes North West
- Lourdes Sur (Talimundoc)
- Lourdes Sur East
- Malabañas
- Margot
- Mining
- Ninoy Aquino (Marisol)
- Pampang
- Pandan
- Pulung Cacutud
- Pulung Maragul
- Pulungbulu
- Salapungan
- San Jose
- San Nicolas
- Santa Teresita
- Santa Trinidad
- Santo Cristo
- Santo Domingo
- Santo Rosario (Poblacion)
- Sapalibutad
- Sapangbato
- Tabun
- Virgen Delos Remedios

==== Anunas ====
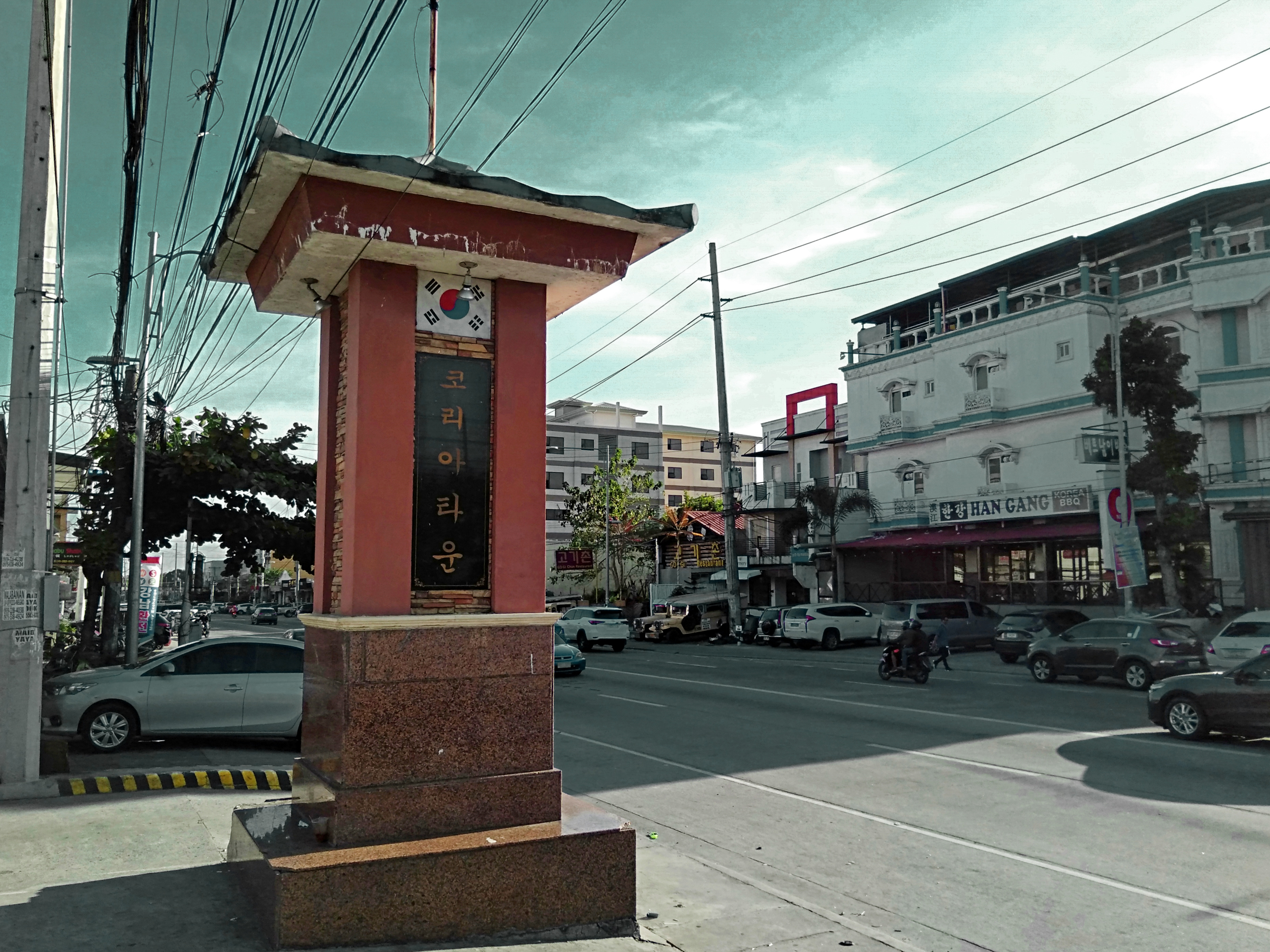
Korea Town of Angeles

Anunas is the barangay that houses the city's Koreatown, a chain of Korean establishments along the Fil-Am Friendship Highway. Anunas is also identified as one of the growth centers of the city, focusing on light industries such as woodcarving and rattan craft.

==== Balibago and Malabañas ====
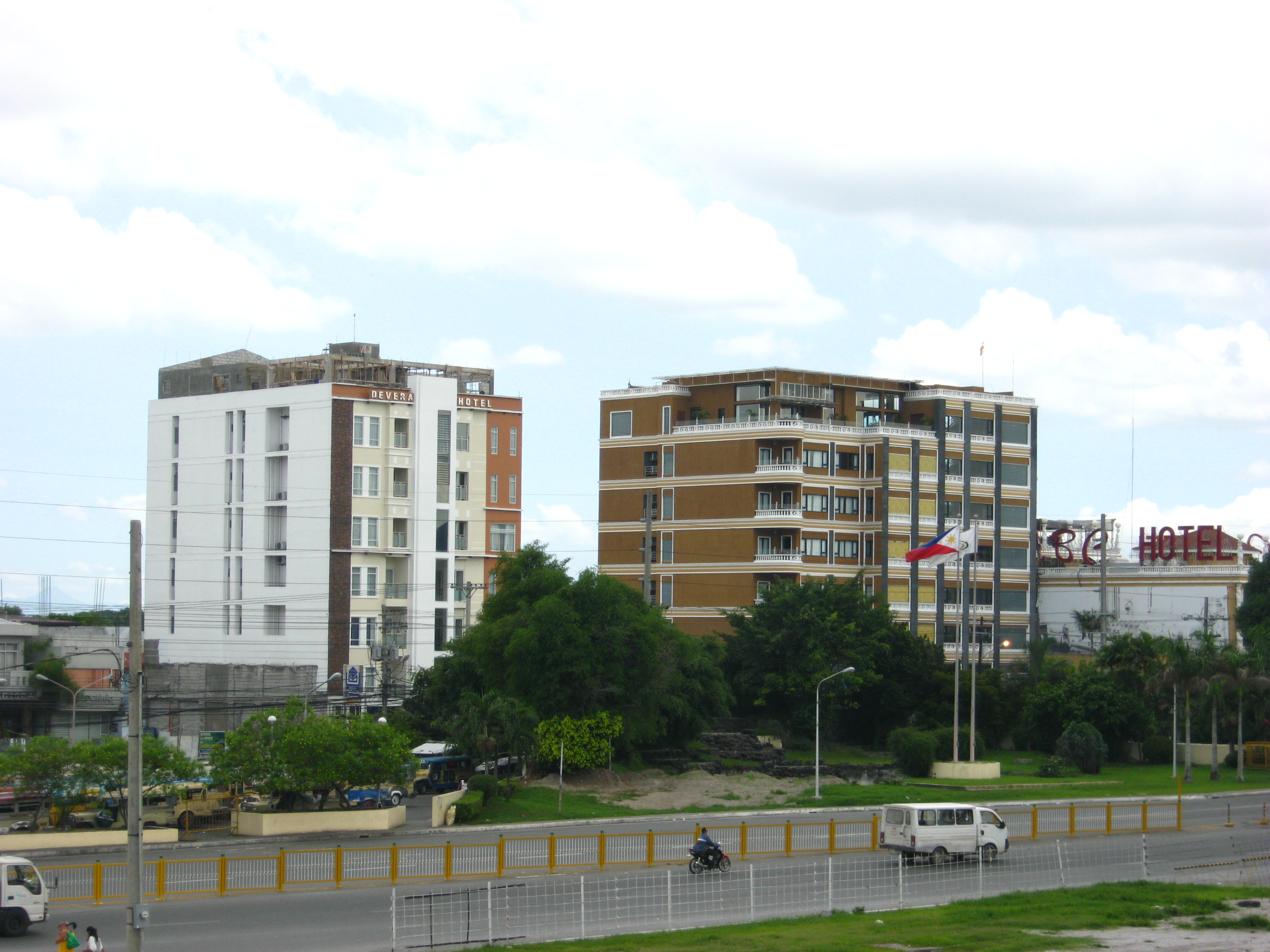
Malabañas skyline

Balibago is the main entertainment district of Angeles. It contains Casino Filipino Angeles and the famous Fields Avenue tourist belt. The city's biggest mall, SM City Clark, is also situated in Barangay Malabañas.

==== Pampang and San Nicolas ====
These two barangays form the main public market district of the city. The Pampang Wet Market, San Nicolas Market, Friday Flea Market (locally referred to as Apu), Jumbo Jenra Angeles, Puregold Angeles, and the Angeles Slaughterhouse are found here. The Pampang Wet Market is the largest and most frequented wet market in the province of Pampanga. It also attracts people from nearby towns. Ospital Ning Angeles (ONA), City College of Angeles, Angeles City National High School are located in Pampang.

==== Pulung Maragul ====
Marquee Mall

Marquee Residences in Pulung Maragul (under construction)

Pulung Maragul is the barangay that houses the city's government complex, which includes the Angeles City Hall, the Angeles City Hall of Justice, and other government buildings. It is also the location of the Angeles Exit of the North Luzon Expressway and Marquee Mall, Ayala's first mall in Central Luzon. Marquee Place and Marquee Residences later rose in Pulung Maragul as well, next to the mall.

==== Santo Rosario ====
Santo Rosario is the poblacion. It is home to most of Angeles' heritage and historical structures such as the Holy Rosary Parish Church, Pamintuan Mansion which is privately owned by Maverick Pamintuan, Bale Herencia, and Museo ning Angeles (former City Hall building). Holy Angel University, Central Luzon's largest university in terms of population, is also located here. Plans of declaring the barangay or parts of it a heritage zone are ongoing.

==== Sapangbato ====
Sapangbato is the largest barangay in Angeles in terms of territory, with a total land area of 104,694 sq. meters and a population of 11,262. Located northwest of Angeles near Clark Freeport Zone, it is identified as the barangay in Angeles with the highest elevation of 750 feet above sea level. It is home to Fort Stotsenburg, also known as the Parade Grounds of Clark. apl.de.ap, member of the hip hop group the Black Eyed Peas, hails from Sapangbato. The famous Puning Hot Springs of Barangay Inararo in Porac are accessed through Sitio Target in Sapangbato.

== Demographics ==
=== Languages ===
Kapampangan is the predominant language of the city, along with Tagalog. English is also widely spoken. Angeles City is also home to the majority of Chinese Filipinos that live in Pampanga, a large portion of these Chinese Filipinos have Philippine Hokkien or (咱人話) as their main language. Due to the growing Korean population in Angeles City, Korean is also spoken by the Korean expatriates that are residing in Angeles City.

Population census of Angeles City

Year	Pop.	±% p.a.
1903	10,646	—
1918	17,948	+3.54%
1939	26,027	+1.79%
1948	37,558	+4.16%
1960	75,900	+6.04%
1970	134,544	+5.88%

Year	Pop.	±% p.a.
1975	151,164	+2.36%
1980	188,834	+4.55%
1990	236,686	+2.28%
1995	234,011	−0.21%
2000	263,971	+2.62%
2007	317,398	+2.57%

Year	Pop.	±% p.a.
2010	326,336	+1.02%
2015	411,634	+4.52%
2020	462,928	+2.50%
2024	483,452	+1.05%

Source: Philippine Statistics Authority

=== Religion ===
The majority of the population of Angeles is Catholic. At least two major festivals associated with the Catholic faith are held in October in the city. Commemorating the victory of the Spanish fleet over the Dutch Navy in 1646, the La Naval Fiesta is celebrated in honor of the Our Lady of La Naval de Manila with adherents believing that her intercession was instrumental to the Spaniards' naval victory. The Apu Fiesta involves devotees from all over Pampanga making a visit to the Apu shrine to venerate the image of Jesus Christ lying in the sepulchre which is believed to be miraculous by believers.

=== Expatriate and immigrant community ===
Owing to the presence of the nearby U.S. Clark Air Force Base and consequent Freeport Zone, many Americans chose to permanently settle in the area, particularly in the Balibago district, and thus Angeles became home to a large colony of expatriates. During the American colonial period (1898–1946), more than 800,000 Americans were born in the Philippines, and a large concentration of Filipino mestizos or Filipinos with American ancestry were located in this city.

== Economy ==
Poverty incidence of Angeles (%)

Source: Philippine Statistics Authority

SM City Clark, the second SM Supermall in Pampanga

Being home of the former Clark Air Base (once the largest United States military facility outside the continental United States), it was significantly affected by the fallout from the eruption of Mount Pinatubo in 1991. The economy of Angeles was heavily dependent on the American base at that time.

In 1993, a full cleanup and removal of volcanic ash deposits began and the former U.S. base was transformed into the Clark Special Economic Zone (CSEZ). The creation of CSEZ has helped to offset the loss of income and jobs previously generated by the presence of the U.S. base in the city. Today, Angeles and Clark form the hub for business, industry, aviation, and tourism in the Philippines as well as a leisure, fitness, entertainment and gaming center of Central Luzon.

Angeles is home to an emerging technology industry. Its economy is based also on tourism and gambling. Fields Avenue forms the hub of the night life industry focused in Angeles. With close proximity to an international airport in Clark Freeport, Angeles is visited by foreigners all year round.

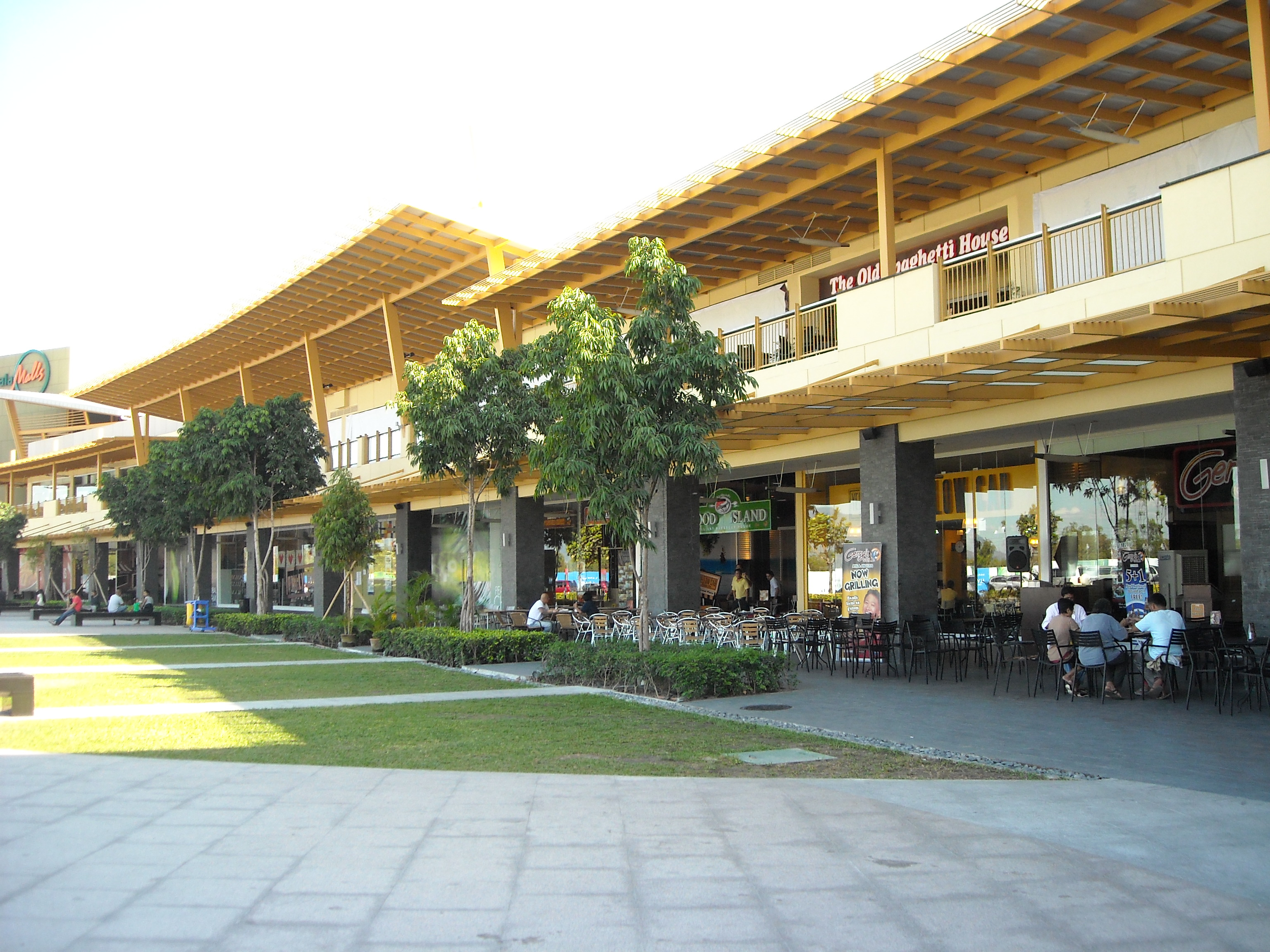
Al-fresco restaurants at the backside of Marquee Mall

In the 2000s, the local government of Angeles rebranded the Fields Avenue tourist belt as a high-end destination with fine restaurants and luxury hotels and casinos. The finishing of roads, such as the Subic–Clark–Tarlac Expressway, has improved trade and transport. The project connects the industrial, transport and business hubs of Pampanga, Zambales, Bataan and Tarlac. The project is crucial to bolstering growth in Central Luzon.

The city has cottage industries producing rattan furniture, coconuts, and charcoal briquettes. It also has many thriving export businesses in handicrafts, metal crafts, toys, houseware and garments. Apart from the Clark Freeport Zone, industrial areas include the Angeles Livelihood Village and the Angeles City Industrial Estate.

Call centers present are e-Telecare, CyberCity, Sutherland and IRMC. Other American IT industries are major employers as well. The establishment of a number of shopping malls also fueled the city's economy, including SM City Clark, Robinsons Angeles, Jenra Grand Mall, Nepo Mall, Saver's Mall and the Marquee Mall, next to City Hall.

Angeles City houses numerous restaurants that are usually located near the malls and mostly in Nepo Quad which was newly renovated to cater the heightened needs of the population.

== Culture ==
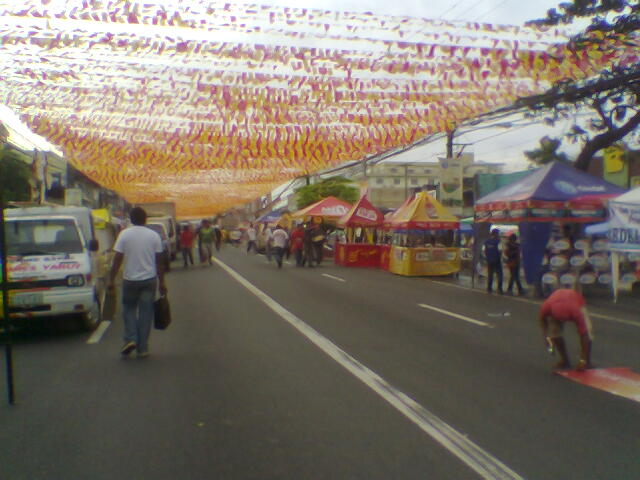
Preparing for the Octoberfest 2009 along McArthur Highway in Balibago district

The city hosts a street party called the Tigtigan Terakan keng Dalan (lit. 'Music and Dancing on the Streets') every October which features musical performances from both amateur and better-known OPM bands. Through Presidential Proclamation 696, October 26, 2024 was declared a special non-working day in celebration of its Tigtigan Terakan Keng Dalan Festival.

The Sisig Festival, locally known as the Sadsaran Qng Angeles, festivities dedicated to the Kapampangan dish sisig, used to be held every December. It was halted in 2008 following the murder of Lucia Cunanan, who was known for promoting the dish. The festival was revived as a one-day fiesta in April 2017 in association with the Department of Tourism.

== Tourism ==
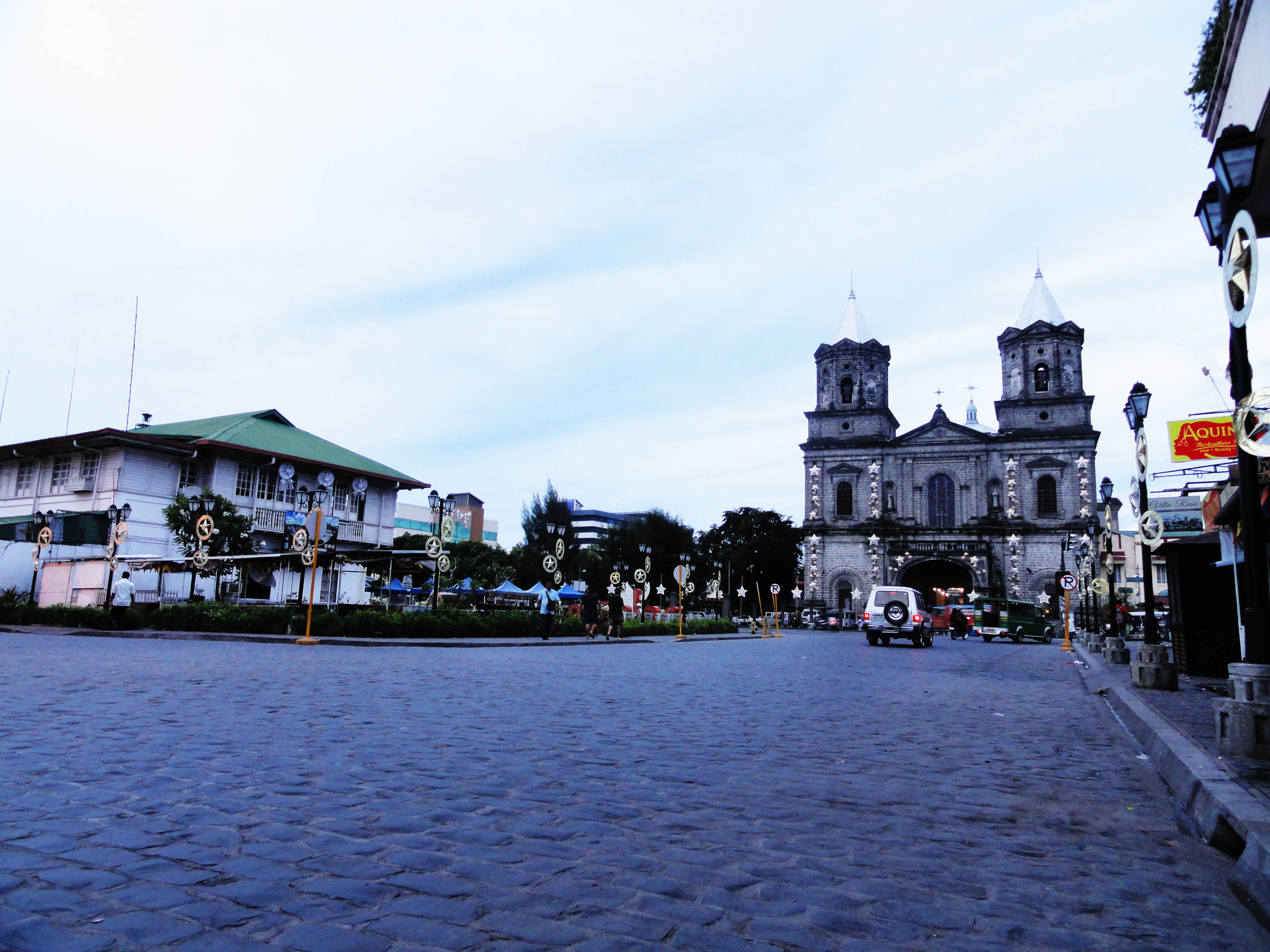
Angeles Heritage District featuring Museo ning Angeles and Santo Rosario Church

The Salakot Arch

Angeles is promoted as a gastronomy tourist destination and is billed as the "culinary capital" of the Philippines. The city is known as a hub for Kampampangan cuisine as well as for its pork sisig. The city also has numerous historically and culturally significant tourist destinations including the Pamintuan Mansion, a heritage house which hosts a history and social studies museum, and the Holy Rosary Church, which is recognized by the National Museum of the Philippines as an Important Cultural Property. Angeles is also situated within the perimeter of the Clark Freeport Zone.

=== Sex tourism ===
One consequence of the historical presence of a US base (until 1991) is the prostitution industry in Angeles. From the early days of Clark Air Base, Fields Avenue in Balibago district became an area frequently visited by the U.S. servicemen. It is until today widely known as a center for prostitution and sex tourism. A BBC article characterized it as "the centre of the Philippines sex industry" and dubbed it "Sin City". Elsewhere and in later years, Philippine travel publications have described it as the "Entertainment Capital of Central Luzon", "The Filipino Las Vegas", and "Entertainment City".

== Government ==
=== Local government ===
Angeles City Hall

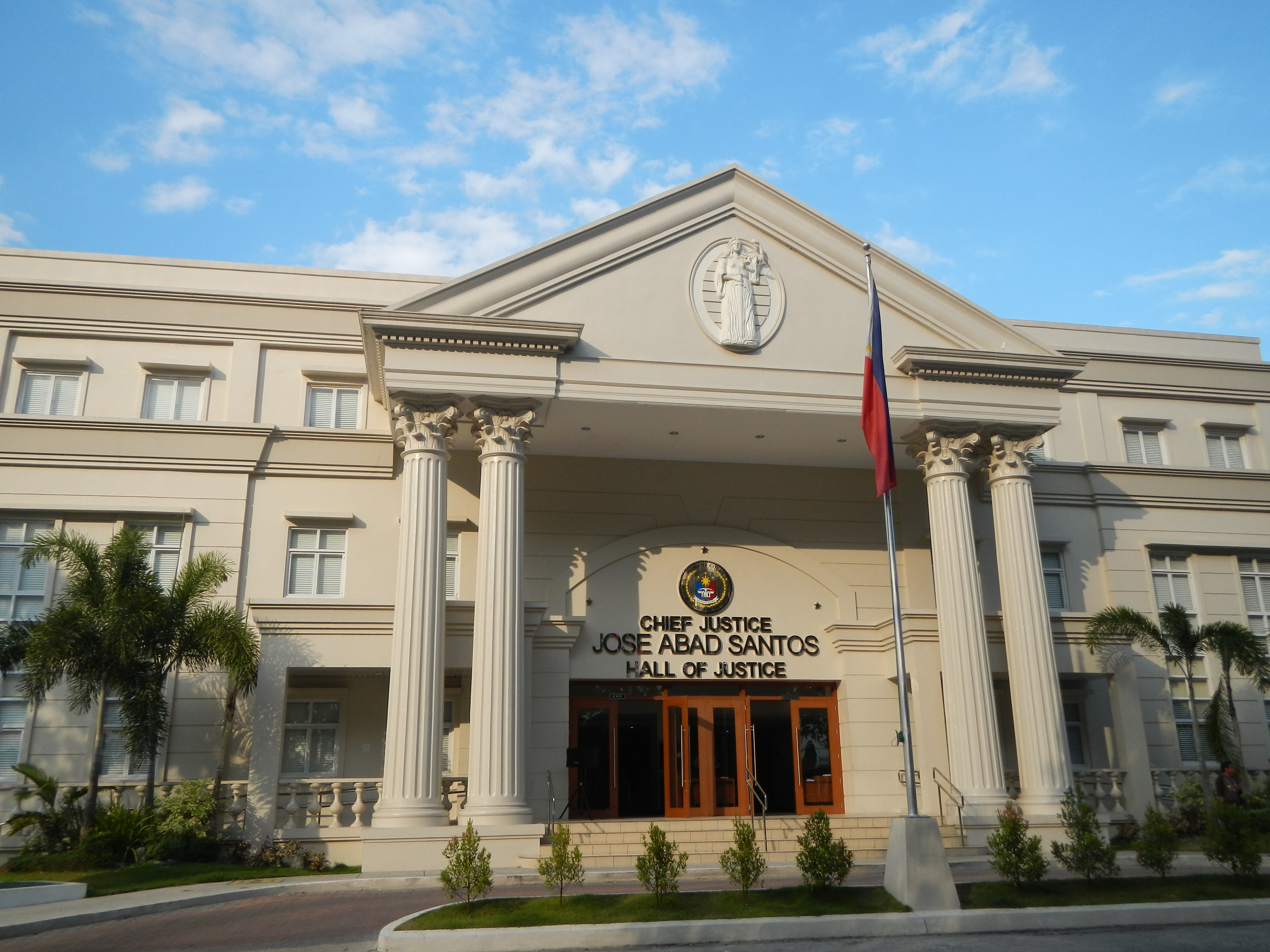
Hall of Justice

As a highly urbanized city in the province of Pampanga, government officials at the provincial level are not voted for by the city. The provincial government has no political jurisdiction over the local transactions of the city government. Residents of this city are not allowed to run for positions at the provincial level, except for congressional representation for the 1st District of Pampanga.

The City of Angeles is governed by a city mayor, designated as its local chief executive, and by a city council as its legislative body in accordance with the Local Government Code. The mayor, vice mayor, and the city councilors are elected directly in polls held every three years.

Barangays are also headed by elected officials: Barangay Captain, Barangay Council, whose members are called Barangay Councilors. The barangays have SK federation which represents the barangay, headed by SK chairperson and whose members are called SK councilors. All officials are also elected every three years.

=== Elected officials ===
Members of the Angeles City Council (2025-2028)
Position	Name
District Representative (1st Legislative District of the province of Pampanga)	Carmelo G. Lazatin Jr.
Chief Executive of the City of Angeles	Mayor Carmelo B. Lazatin II
Presiding Officer of the City Council of Angeles	Vice Mayor Amos B. Rivera
Members of the 20th City Council	Arvin M. Suller
Members of the 20th City Council	Joan Crystal J. Parker-Aguas
Members of the 20th City Council	Marino D. Bañola
Members of the 20th City Council	Maricel Morales-Agoncillo
Members of the 20th City Council	Edgardo G. Pamintuan Jr.
Members of the 20th City Council	Jezreel Aaron L. Pineda
Members of the 20th City Council	Alexander P. Indiongco
Members of the 20th City Council	Michelle M. Bonifacio
Members of the 20th City Council	Jeselle Ann V. Dayrit
Members of the 20th City Council	Raco Paolo S. Del Rosario

=== Congress representation ===
Angeles belongs to the first legislative district of the province of Pampanga. Currently, the city is represented by Carmelo G. Lazatin Jr. in the house of representatives.

== Education ==
- Angeles City National High School (ACNHS)
- AIE College
- AMA Computer Learning Center – Angeles
- AMA Computer University – Angeles
- Angeles City National Trade School
- Angeles City Science High School
- Angeles University Foundation
- Asian Institute of College Studies
- Asian Institute of Science and Technology
- Bonifacio V. Romero High School (formerly Epza High School)
- Chevalier School
- City College of Angeles (Pampang)
- Claro M. Recto Information and Communication Technology High School
- Computer System Specialist
- Dr. Clemente N. Dayrit Sr. Memorial High School (formerly RLLMHS Extension) (Lourdes Sur East)
- Gov. Rafael L. Lazatin Integrated School (Samerra Subd, Sapalibutad)
- Holy Angel University
- Holy Family Academy
- J&K International College
- Jocson College
- Malabanias Integrated School (Clarkview Subd, Malabanias)
- Mother of Perpetual Help Institute
- NU Clark
- OB Montessori Center (Angeles Branch)
- Rafael L. Lazatin Memorial High School (RLLMHS Main)
- Republic Central Colleges (Lourdes Sur)
- School of the Holy Child
- St. Augustine School of Nursing
- Skill Power Institute
- STI College – Angeles
- Systems Plus College Foundation

== Media ==
The only Cable TV channel in Angeles City is PEP TV, on cable provider Air Cable Channel 3 SD and 209 in HD. There are three radio stations in the city: UFM 105.5, GVAM 792 and GV 99.1.

== Transport ==
Clark International Airport is near the city; it is served by many passenger and cargo airlines, including some international ones.

List of Accredited Transport Cooperatives as of January 2021:

- Bayanihan Terminal-Industrial Estate 5 Transport Service Cooperative
- Dau Operators and Drivers Transport Cooperative
- Electric Vehicle Operators Transport Service Cooperative
- Gp Elite Transport Service Cooperative
- Manibaug-Angeles Sta.Cruz Jeepney Operators and Drivers Transport Service Cooperative
- Team Byahero Transport Service Cooperative

== Sister cities ==
Angeles has the following sister cities:

=== Local ===
- Baguio, Philippines
- Cabanatuan, Philippines
- Davao City, Philippines
- General Santos, Philippines
- San Fernando, Pampanga, Philippines
- Valenzuela, Philippines
- Vigan, Philippines

=== International ===
- Daegu, South Korea
- (United States) Las Vegas, Nevada, U.S.
- Pattaya, Thailand
- Shibuya, Japan
- Taoyuan, Taiwan
