= Umai (food) =

Traditional salad of Sarawak, Malaysia

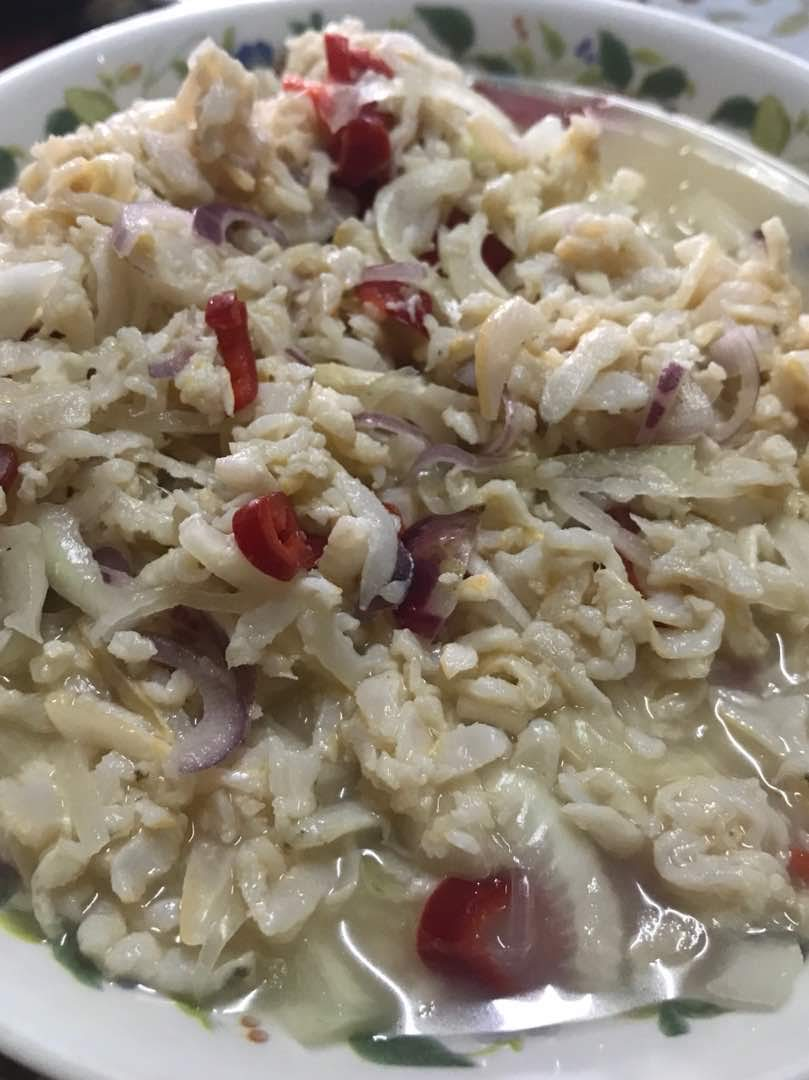
- A bowl of Umai ready to be eaten.
- Type: Salad dish
- Course: Appetiser
- Place of origin: Malaysia
- Region or state: Sarawak
- Associated cuisine: Sarawakian cuisine
- Created by: Melanau
- Main ingredients: Fish (Either scaly hairfin anchovy, mackerel or black pomfret) or prawn/shrimp, thinly sliced onions, chillies, salt and lime juice
- Food energy (per serving): 123 kcal (510 kJ)

Umai is a traditional native salad dish of the Melanau people in the state of Sarawak within East Malaysia. It is made of sliced raw fish with a mixture of onions, chillies, vinegar, salt and lime juice. The dish has been recognised as a national heritage dish by Malaysia's Department of National Heritage in 2009, alongside hinava of Sabah.

== Preparation ==
It is commonly prepared by the Melanau people living along the coast of Sarawak, often made with different types of freshly caught fish such as tenggiri (Spanish mackerel), puput (setipinna), duai (pomfret), terubuk (toli shad), empirang (setipinna taty), and haruan (snakehead), although a version made from fresh prawn and shrimp also exists. The salad is made by cleaning the fish or prawn/shrimp and mixing it with shallots, onions, chilli, lime juice, and ginger, together with other local ingredients based on individual taste.

The fish meat or shrimp will usually be sliced thinly with the ingredients pounded and mashed thoroughly, where they will be mixed with the sliced fish or shrimp prepared earlier. Lime juice, salt and seasoning will then be added to enhance the sour taste of umai with the amount depending on personal preference, with most of the salad dish preparers choosing to make it slightly spicy and tangy to taste. Umai is eaten right away after being prepared, either with hot rice or sago or being kept in the refrigerator for a while.

== The Malaysia Book of Records ==
In 2012, a 170.3 metres (559 ft) umai prepared during "Masihkah Kau Ingat" (Do You Still Remember) carnival in Dalat of Sarawak was certified as the "longest umai" ever prepared.

== Safety ==
Similar to other raw fish and shrimp dishes, there were concerns about the possible presence of dangerous parasites such as (Anisakis sp.) and (Heterophyes sp.). The safety guidelines from the Food and Drug Administration (FDA) of the United States recommend blast freezing to at least −35 °C (−31 °F) for 15 hours or regular freezing to at least −23 °C (−9 °F) for 7 days,, but these treatments tend to degrade the quality of the seafood. Other preservation and modernisation of chilled pre-packed umai are being explored as an alternative. Prior to preparing umai, some makers also choose to freeze the raw fish chunks, while others would sun-dry their fish.

== Gallery ==
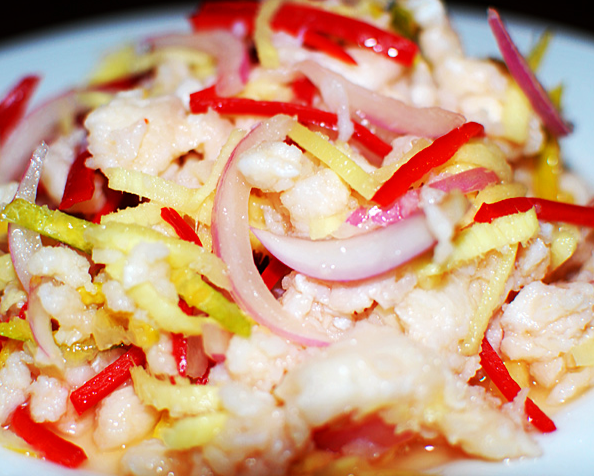
A closeup of freshly made umai

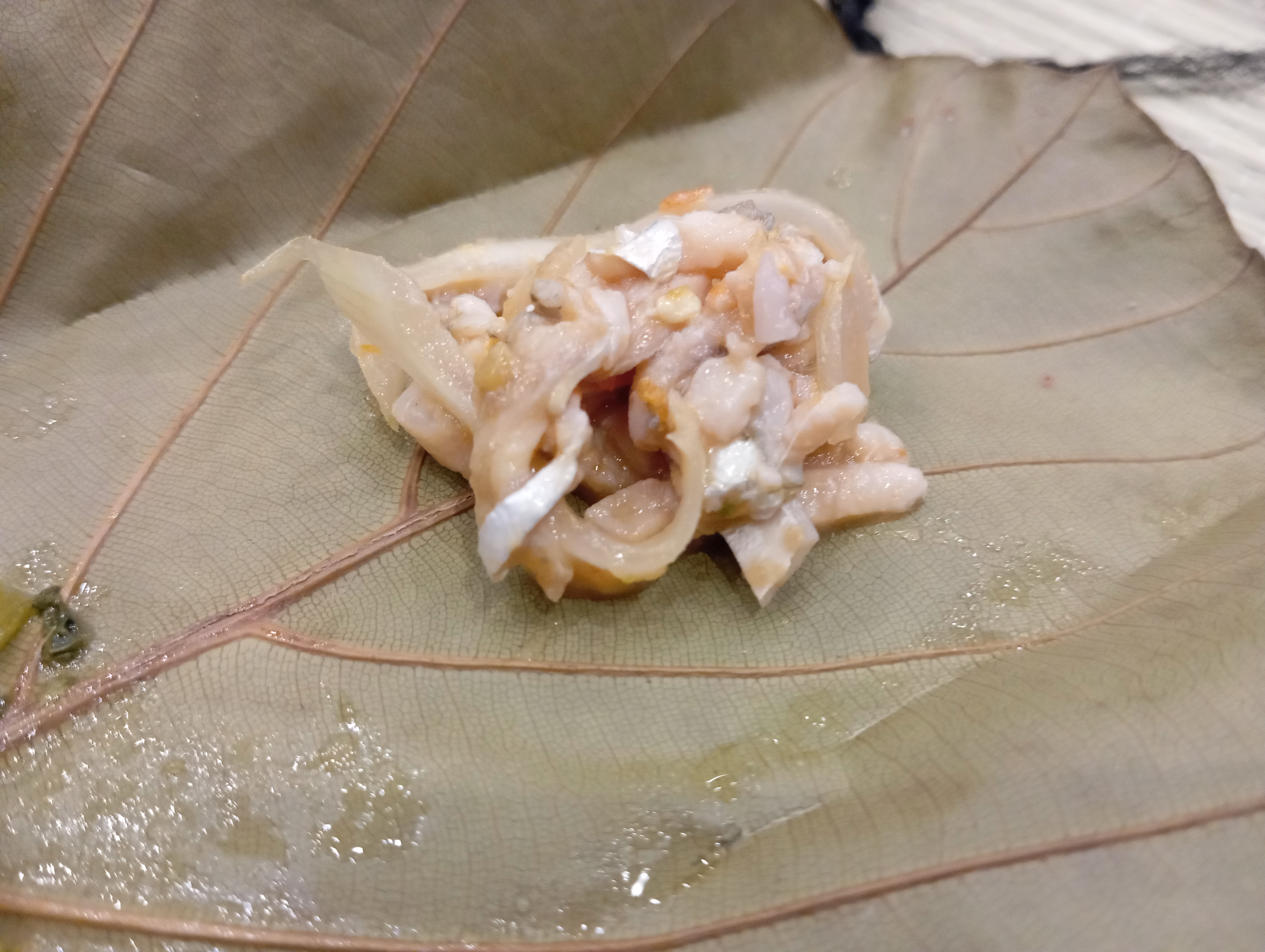
Umai is traditionally served in a leaf

== See also ==
- Hinava, a similar dish from neighbouring state of Sabah
- Kinilaw, a similar dish from the Philippines
- Ceviche
- Sashimi
- List of raw fish dishes

== Bibliography ==
- Sukirman, Aini N.; Khalex, Harizt B.; Mustafa, Suhaili; et al. (2020). "Umai Dish Preparation Practices and Food Safety Behaviors in Bintulu Locals on Borneo Island, Malaysia". Journal of Food Protection. 83 (10): 1764–1774. doi:10.4315/JFP-19-543 – via Elsevier/ScienceDirect.
- Chua, H.P.; Nicholas, D. (2025). "Exploring the preservation and modenisation [sic] of chilled pre-packed umai: Sarawak traditional raw fish delicacy" (PDF). Food Research. 8 (8): 61–64. doi:10.26656/fr.2017.8(S8).7. Archived (PDF) from the original on 10 June 2026.
