= Peruvian ceviche =

Traditional fish dish

Peruvian Ceviche
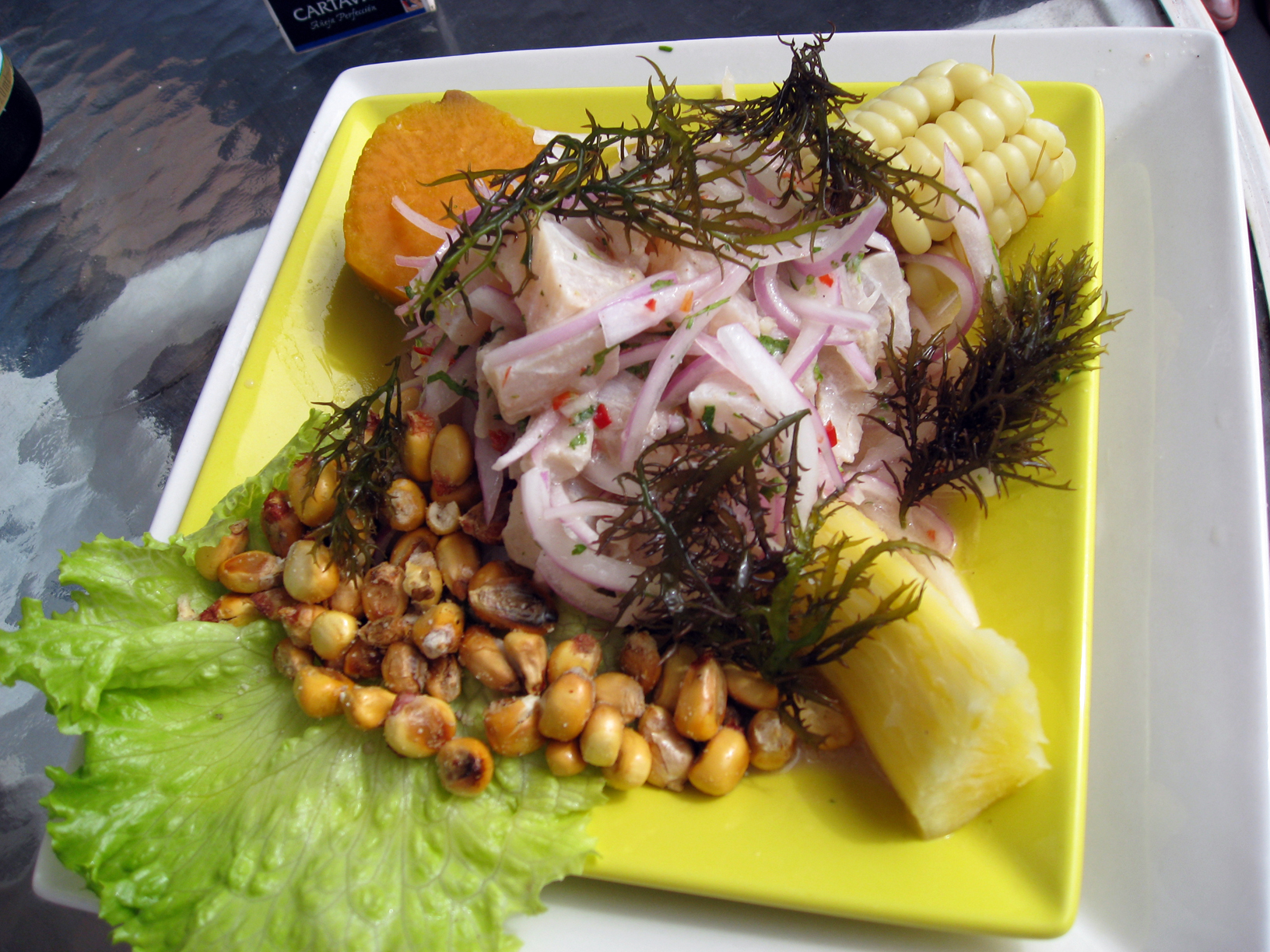
- Fish ceviche
- Course: Main course, appetizer
- Associated cuisine: Peruvian
- Main ingredients: Fish, lime juice, onion, chili pepper, corn, sweet potato
- Similar dishes: Tiradito

Peruvian ceviche, cebiche, sebiche, or seviche is a traditional dish widely eaten in Peru especially in the coastal region of the country. Ceviche is made and eaten throughout the whole year, but mostly served in the summer due to its refreshing and cold taste. It is also consumed for celebrations such as Fiestas Patrias. The national plate can be considered different from other countries due to its distinct and unique preparation that contains lime juice, fish, sweet potatoes and other foods.

In 2004, ceviche was declared to be part of Peru's "national heritage" and till this day, it continues being a holiday celebrated in its honor every June 28th. These achievements are attributed to different factors including UNESCO recognizing ceviche as an Intangible Cultural Heritage of Humanity on December of 2023. This was a great transformation of ceviche turning into a luxury due to scarcity, considering a Peruvian gastronomic boom led by gastropolitical elites who brought ceviche outside of Latin America. This growing global popularity of the dish has contributed to an even greater sense of pride in the national cuisine among Peruvians across the world. On the other hand, because ceviche has become a luxury, some restaurants resort to seafood fraud to increase their profits by selling less valuable species labeled as species of greater value. Moreover, threatened species have been found among these substitutes.

== History ==
Very little is known about the origin of ceviche, but there are some references attributing the Peruvian ceviche to a mix of inputs, including European cuisine and Andean cuisine. There is also a variety of historical anecdotes or legends surrounding the dish's creation. Some historians propose that Indigenous communities potentially utilized the extract from a passion fruit referred to as tumbo to preserve the plentiful seafood along the Pacific Coast, while other scholars theorize that a combination of saltwater, seaweed, and hot peppers might have been employed instead. Others say Incas used herbs or chicha for the preservation of fish. They add that the arrival of Columbus and his associates in the fifteenth century, bringing citrus fruits to the New World, allowed ceviche's gradual evolution. Among other theories, there is the belief that the Mochica culture was the first to prepare ceviche, that it was actually fisher slaves during the colonial period trying to end their hunger and malnutrition, or even that it came from the Philippines.

== Preparation and variants ==
The classic Peruvian ceviche is composed of chunks of raw fish, marinated in freshly squeezed key lime or bitter orange (naranja agria) juice, with sliced onions, chili peppers, salt and pepper. Corvina or cebo (sea bass) was the fish traditionally used. The mixture was traditionally marinated for several hours and served at room temperature, with chunks of corn-on-the-cob, and slices of cooked sweet potato.

Regional or contemporary variations include garlic, fish bone broth, minced Peruvian ají limo, or the Andean chili rocoto, toasted corn or cancha (corn nut) and yuyo (seaweed). A specialty of Trujillo is ceviche prepared from shark (tollo or tojo). Lenguado (sole) is often used in Lima. The ingredients that characterize these regional variations are chosen depending on the natural features of the landscape, most are local ingredients that can be cultivated or found within the region.

Most Peruvian cevicherías serve a small glass of marinade (as an appetizer) along with the fish, which is called leche de tigre or leche de pantera, "tiger's milk" or "panther's milk," respectively. It is a milky white, finely blended, and strained mix of lime juice, raw fish, red onion, garlic, cilantro stems, celery, and ginger. This appetizer differentiates Peruvian ceviche from other styles in Latin America.

Among these other popular presentations are the Mexican-style ceviche, which includes fish marinated in lime juice and tossed with pico de gallo, baked potato, and parsley; the Colombian-style one, that features Corvina with lime juice, avocado, and coconut milk; and the Ecuadorian one, which includes shrimp with onion, lemon juice, and cilantro with chifle as side.

The modern version of Peruvian ceviche, which is similar to the method used in making Japanese sashimi, consists of fish marinated in citrus juice for about 45 minutes and served promptly. It was developed in the 1970s by Peruvian-Japanese chefs including Dario Matsufuji and Humberto Sato. Some elite restaurants employ a rapid-marinade technique instead, a citrus bath of only five minutes which elite chefs believe to be perfect to get the "best flavor." However, experts suggest a marinade time of a minimum of 15 minutes in order to kill all bacteria present in the seafood.
