= Hinava =

Traditional salad of Sabah, Malaysia

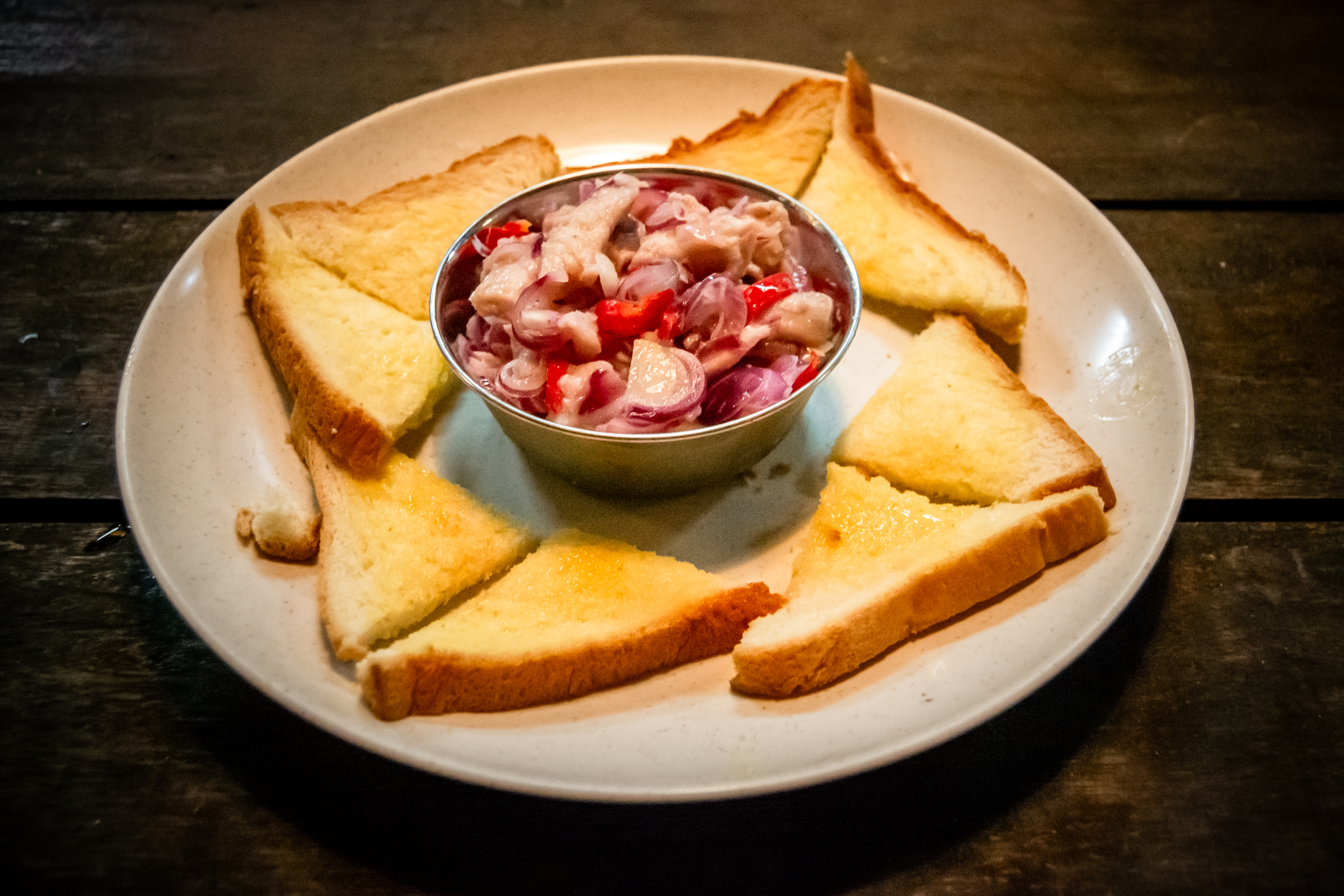
- A swordfish hinava served with sandwich bread
- Alternative names: hinata
- Type: Salad dish
- Course: Appetiser
- Place of origin: Malaysia
- Region or state: Sabah
- Associated cuisine: Sabahan cuisine
- Created by: Kadazan or Lotud Dusun
- Main ingredients: Fish, lime juice, bird's eye chilli, red onion, salt
- Variations: Hinava ginapan, hinava tongi

Hinava is a traditional native salad dish of the Kadazan-Dusun people in the state of Sabah within East Malaysia. It is made from raw fish and mixed with lime juice, bird's eye chilli, sliced shallots and grated ginger. Hinava is one of the main ethnic foods among the Kadazan and Dusun, often served during occasions such as the Kaamatan harvest festival, engagements, weddings, and other cultural feasts. The dish has been recognised as a national heritage dish by Malaysia's Department of National Heritage in 2009, alongside umai of Sarawak.

== Preparation ==
Part of the Kadazan-Dusun heritage, hinava often served as a salad or appetiser, made by mixing fresh raw tenggiri (Spanish mackerel), thinly sliced or diced, then mixed with chillies, grated ginger, sliced shallots, grated bambangan (Mangifera pajang) seed, and salt, together with a squeeze of lime or calamansi juice. The dish is usually made using either sharks or mackerel, although other fish can also be used depending on the individual's taste. While the Kadazan are famous for their hinava tongi, the Lotud Dusun called their similar raw fish dish spread with lemon and vinegar as hinata. Hinava is rich in source of protein as it contains all the healthy components of a raw fish. Another version of hinava with prawn as the main source is called the hinava ginapan.

== Gallery ==
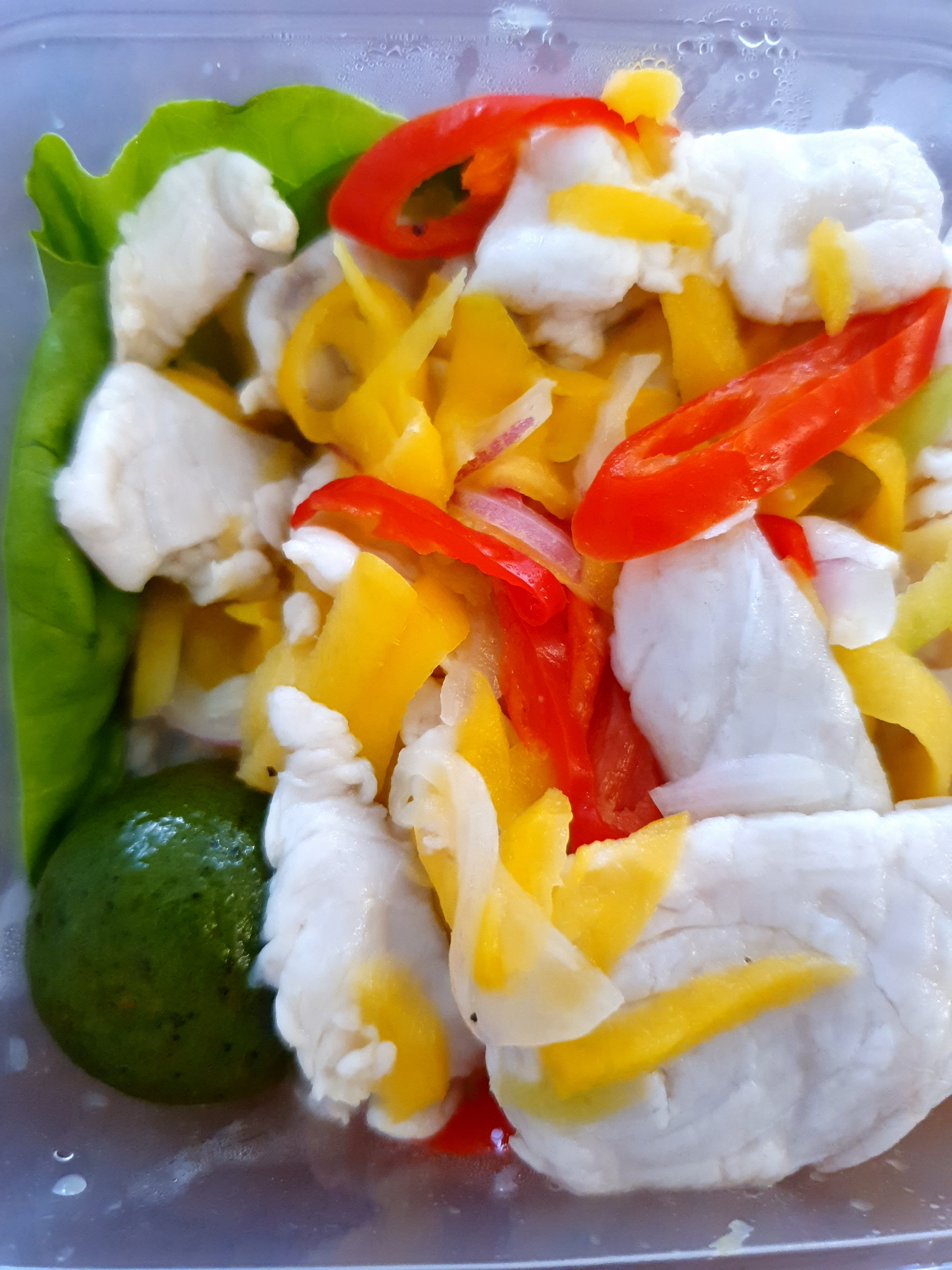
Freshly made hinava with chillies, lime and mango

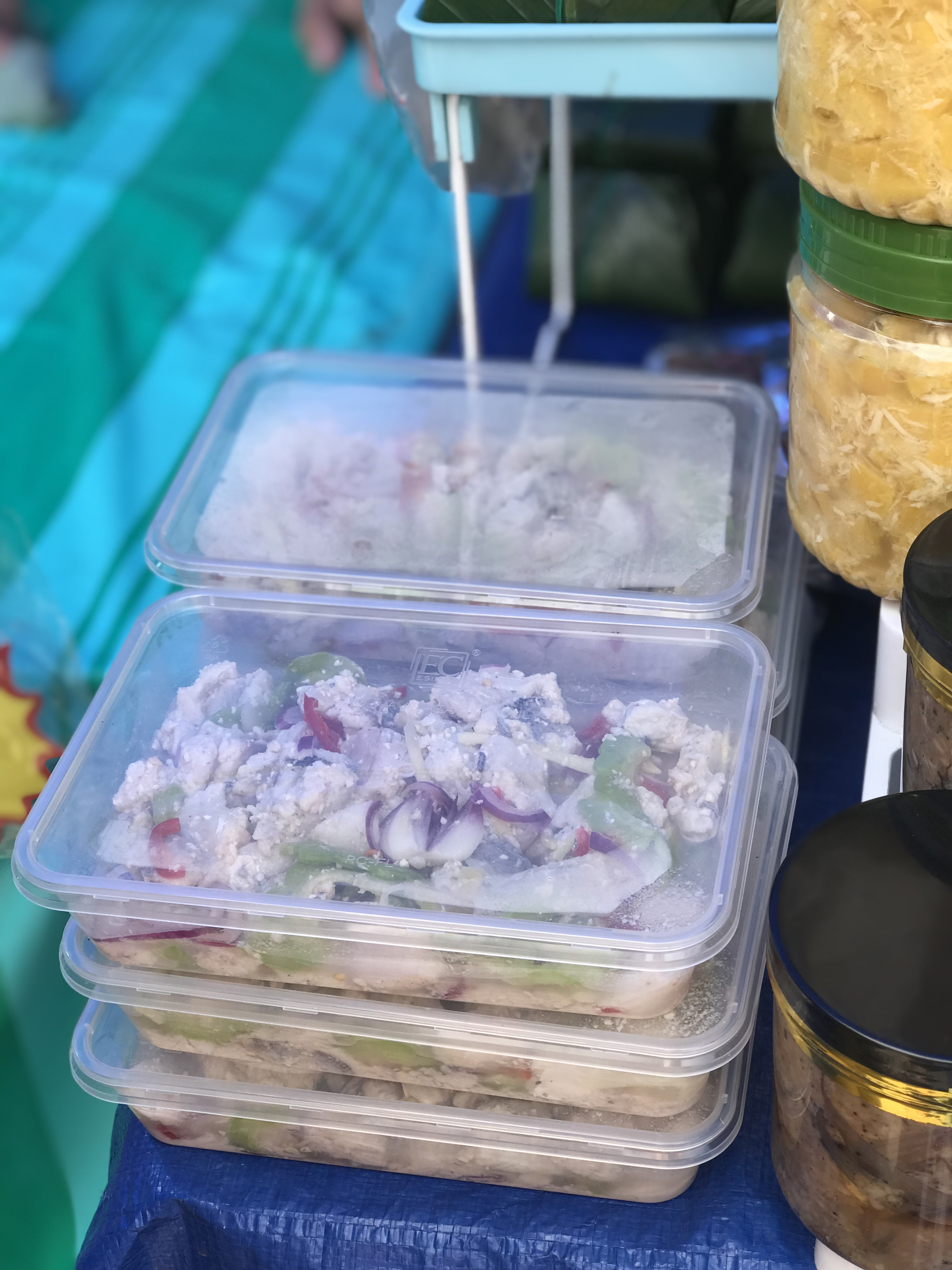
Hinava served inside a container during a food festive

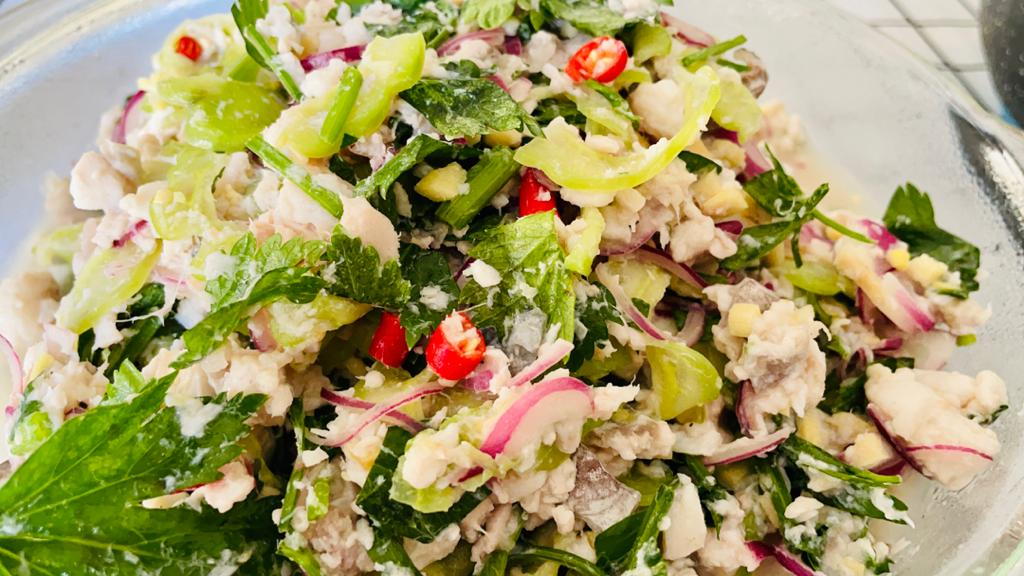
The mixture of hinava

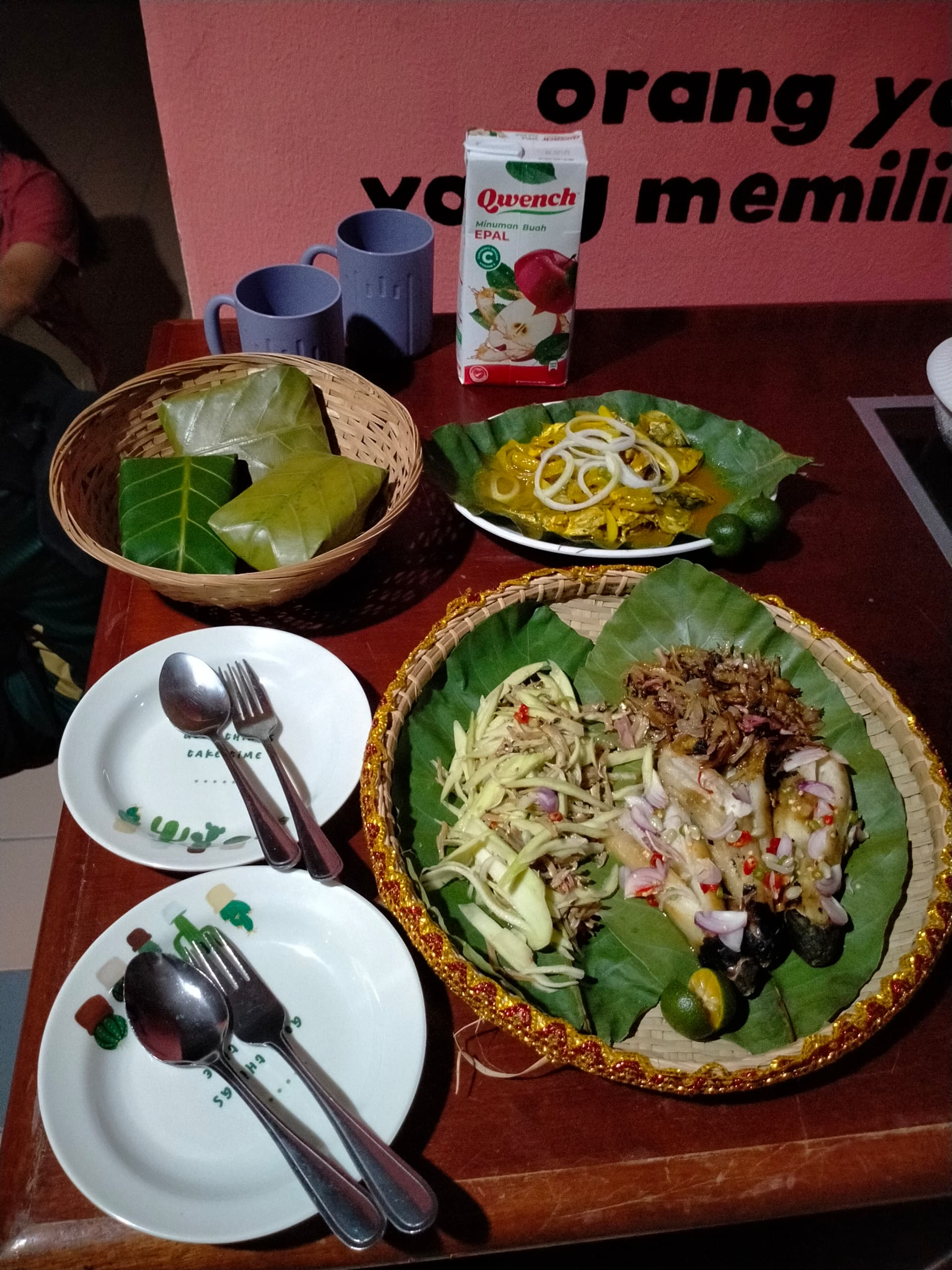
Hinava served with other traditional foods of Sabah

== See also ==
- Umai, a similar dish from neighbouring state of Sarawak
- Kinilaw, a similar dish from the Philippines
- Ceviche
- Sashimi
- Pinaasakan sada
- List of raw fish dishes
