= Torisashi =

Japanese chicken dish

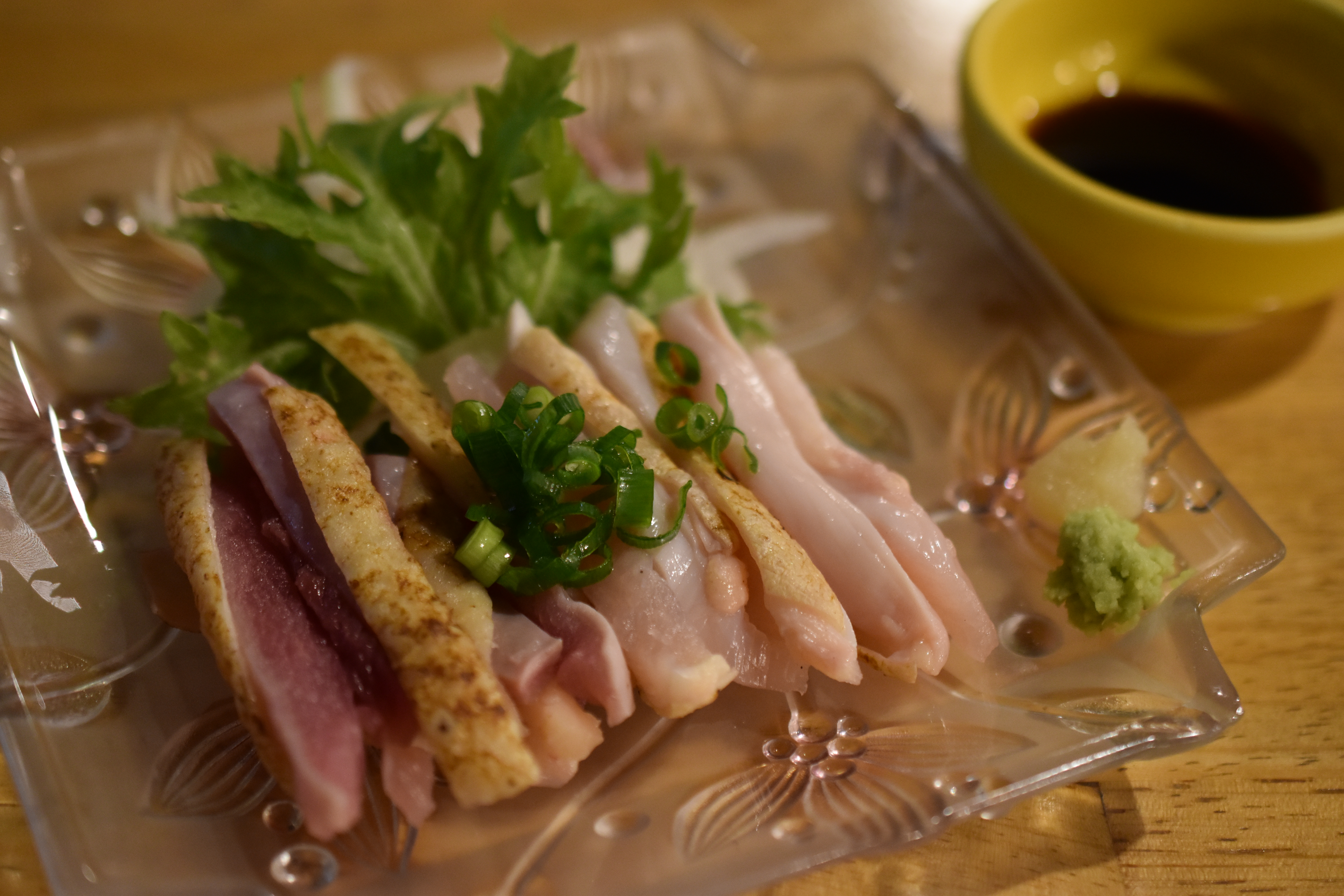
Torisashi as served at a restaurant in Kirishima, Kagoshima.

Torisashi (鶏刺し) is a Japanese dish of thinly sliced raw chicken. The chicken may be lightly seared (then also called tataki or toriwasa though originally toriwasa referred to torisashi eaten with wasabi), or quickly dipped in boiling water (yuarai). It is most commonly eaten with sumiso but may also be eaten with soy sauce and wasabi like other sashimi.

Torisashi is a regional specialty to the island of Kyushu, specifically in Kagoshima and Miyazaki prefectures.

Torisashi typically requires a high quality of chicken meat and hygiene in preparation, due to the risk of food-borne illness that has at times affected diners.

== See also ==
- List of chicken dishes
- Sashimi
