= List of raw fish dishes =

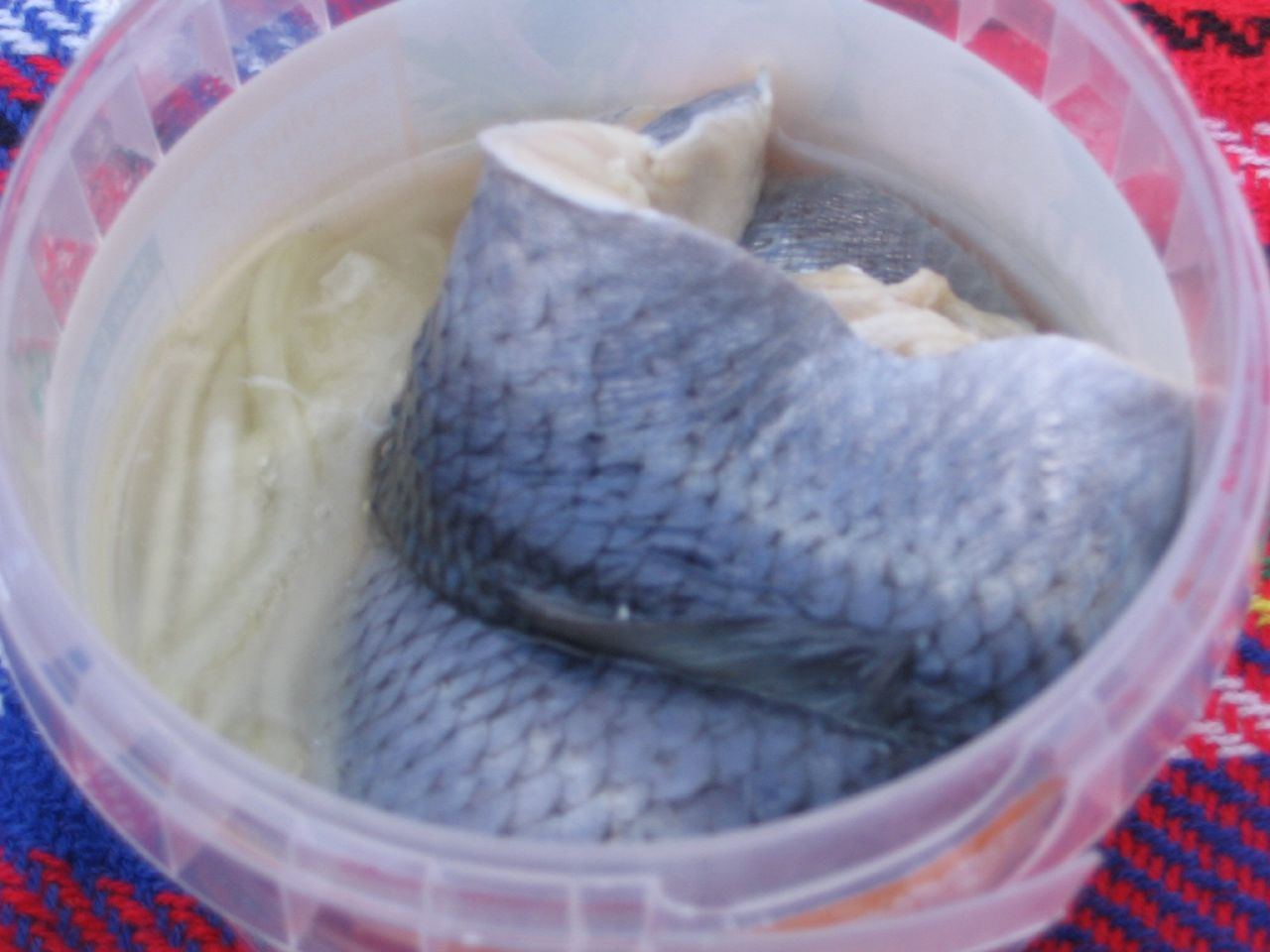
Raw herring dish

Raw fish or shellfish dishes include marinated raw fish (soaked in a seasoned liquid) and raw fish which is lightly cured such as gravlax, but not fish which is fully cured (fermented, pickled, smoked or otherwise preserved).

== Raw fish dishes ==
Name	Image	Origin	Description
Aguachile		Mexico	Raw shrimp submerged in lime juice with cucumber, onion, and chiltepín peppers.
Carpaccio		Italy	Very thin slices of marinated swordfish, tuna, or other large fish (a variant of the more common beef carpaccio)
Ceviche		Perú	Marinated raw fish dish
Crudo		Italy	Raw fish dressed with olive oil, sea salt, and citrus.
E'ia Ota		Tahiti	Raw tuna in lime and coconut milk
Esqueixada		Catalan	Salad based on raw cod, tomato and black olives.
Gravlax	Gravlax served with eel pâté	Nordic	Raw salmon, lightly cured in salt, sugar, and dill. Usually served as an appetizer, sliced thinly and accompanied by a dill and mustard sauce with bread or boiled potatoes.
Gohu ikan		North Maluku, Indonesia	Gohu ikan could be made with tuna, skipjack, or grouper. The fish is cut into small pieces. To remove the fishy smell, the fish meat is washed repeatedly until there's no more blood left. After cleaning thoroughly, the fish meat is marinated with salt and citrus juice. The red fish meat will become a bit white. It is then mixed and stirred with sliced onion, rica (a spicy chili), and basil leaves. It has a sour flavor, spicy, with a strong aroma of basil. Roasted and coarsely grounded canary seeds can be used as a flavor enhancer.
Hinava		Malaysia	A traditional Kadazan-Dusun dish from Sabah. Raw fish (typically firm fleshed white fish) marinated with citrus juice (usually calamansi lime), sliced shallots, julienned ginger and grated dried seed of the bambangan fruit, a species of wild mango found in Borneo. Optional additions include sliced chilli and bitter gourd.
Hoe		Korea	Raw seafood slices typically served with either soy-sauce or hot pepper paste based dipping sauce.
Kelaguen		Mariana Islands	Chamorro dish derived from the Filipino kinilaw (kilawin). It is generally made with cooked chicken, beef, or liver but can also use raw fish and other seafood.
Kinilaw		Philippines	Traditional pre-colonial marinated dish generally made with raw fish (but can also be made with other raw seafood, cooked meat, or vegetables). It is generally marinated in a local vinegar (e.g., coconut, cane, or palm vinegar); native citruses such as calamansi, dayap (key lime), and biasong; and other sour acidic fruits like bilimbi, green mangoes, and tamarind. Some regions also add coconut milk and astringent bark or fruit extracts to neutralize the fishy taste and the acidity before serving.
Koi pla		Thailand	Minced or finely chopped raw fish in spicy salad. The most popular raw fish dish in Isan.
Kokoda		Fiji	Appetiser or side dish of any white fish. A common staple.
Kuai		China	Finely cut strips of raw fish or meat, which was popular and commonly eaten in the early history and dynastic times of China. According to the Book of Rites compiled between 202 BCE–220 CE, kuai consists of small thin slices or strips of raw meat, which are prepared by first thinly slicing the meat and then cutting the thin slices into strips. In modern times, the dishes are more often referred to as "raw fish slices". Commonly used fish in ancient times include carp and mandarin fish, but salmon is also used in modern times. Sauces were an essential part of kuai dishes, with green onions used for preparation of sauces in spring and mustard seed used for sauces in autumn. According to many classical texts, kuai served without sauces was deemed inedible and should be avoided.
Lakerda		Turkey	Pickled bonito dish eaten as a mezze in the cuisines of the former Ottoman Empire. Lakerda made from one-year-old bonito migrating through the Bosphorus is especially prized.
Lap pa Larb pla		Laos; Thailand	A Lao and Thai salad of raw freshwater river fish mixed with lime, cilantro, mint, scallions, roasted rice, chilis
Lawa' Bale		South Sulawesi, Indonesia	Commonly associated with the Bugis people. The meal features fresh raw fish cured in vinegar and citrus juices, including bilimbi and unriped mango; as well as being spiced with grated coconut, garlic and chilies.
Lomi oio		Hawaii	Finely minced or pureed raw fish mixed with salt. Seaweed, onions, limpets, shrimp, tomatoes, and chili are optional.
Namerō		Japan, Bōsō Peninsula	Finely chopped raw fish mixed with spices and spread thin
'Ota 'ika		Tonga	Raw fish dish typically made with coconut cream, tomatoes, lemon and spring onions.
Poke		Hawaii	Raw fish salad
Sashimi		Japan	Sliced raw seafood. Dipped in soy sauce and wasabi before eating.
Soused herring (maatjes)		Netherlands	New season herring soaked in a mild preserving liquid
Stroganina		Russia	A dish of the indigenous people of northern Arctic Siberia made from raw thin sliced frozen fish.
Tiradito		Peru	Variant of ceviche influenced by sashimi
Tuna tartare		Disputed	Minced raw tuna dish
Umai		Malaysia	A closely similar dish like the hinava, popular with the Melanau community in Sarawak.
Xató or Xatonada		Catalan	Raw cod, anchovies and tuna fish with escarole, arbequinas olives, and "romesco" sauce.
Yusheng		Disputed	Raw fish salad

== Health concerns ==
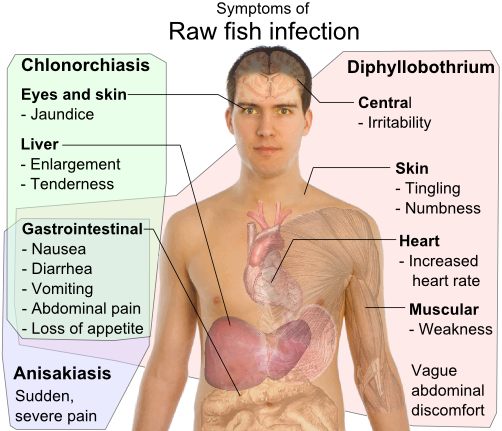
Differential symptoms of parasite infections by raw fish. All have gastrointestinal, but otherwise distinct, symptoms.

Parasites in fish are a natural occurrence and common. Though not a health concern in thoroughly cooked fish, parasites are a concern when consumers eat raw or lightly preserved fish such as sashimi, sushi, ceviche, and gravlax. Raw fish should be frozen to an internal temperature of −20 °C (−4 °F) for at least 7 days to kill parasites. Home freezers may not be cold enough to kill parasites.

Traditionally, fish that live all or part of their lives in fresh water were considered unsuitable for sashimi due to the possibility of parasites (see sashimi article). Parasitic infections from freshwater fish are a serious problem in some parts of the world, particularly Southeast Asia. Fish that spend part of their life cycle in brackish or freshwater, like salmon are a particular problem. A study in Seattle, Washington showed that 100% of wild salmon had roundworm larvae capable of infecting people. In the same study farm raised salmon did not have any roundworm larvae.

Parasite infection by raw fish is rare in the developed world (fewer than 40 cases per year in the U.S.), and involves mainly three kinds of parasites: Clonorchis sinensis (a trematode/fluke), Anisakis (a nematode/roundworm) and Diphyllobothrium (a cestode/tapeworm). Infection risk of anisakis is particularly higher in fishes which may live in a river such as salmon (sake) in Salmonidae or mackerel (saba). Such parasite infections can generally be avoided by boiling, burning, preserving in salt or vinegar, or freezing overnight. In Japan it is common to eat raw salmon and ikura, but these foods are frozen overnight prior to eating to prevent infections from parasites, particularly anisakis.

== See also ==
- Eating live seafood
- Lomi salmon
- List of fish dishes
- List of seafood dishes
