= Sumiso =

Japanese condiment

- Type: Sauce
- Place of origin: Japan
- Associated cuisine: Japanese
- Main ingredients: Miso, vinegar, sugar

Sumiso (Japanese: 酢味噌) is a Japanese sauce used in cooking. It consists of miso, vinegar, and sugar. Various types of miso may be used, including the red, white, or saikyō categories. Sumiso has a sweet and sour taste and is commonly eaten with Japanese seasonal vegetables or seafood.
