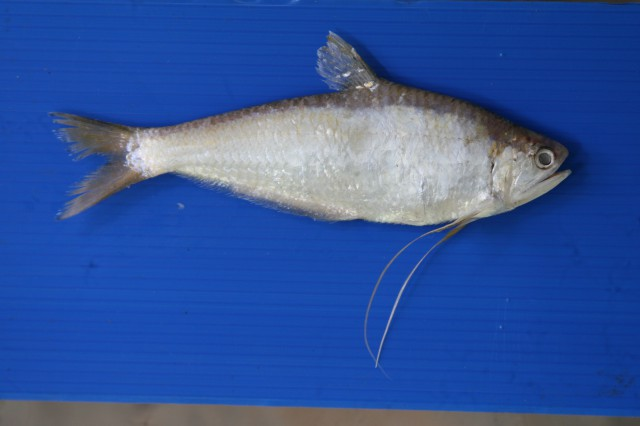
- Setipinna taty

Scientific classification
- Domain: Eukaryota
- Kingdom: Animalia
- Phylum: Chordata
- Class: Actinopterygii
- Order: Clupeiformes
- Family: Engraulidae
- Subfamily: Coiliinae
- Genus: Setipinna; Swainson, 1839

Type species
- Setipinna megalura (a synonym of Clupea phasa Hamilton, 1822 Swainson, 1839

= Setipinna =

Genus of ray-finned fishes

Setipinna, the hairfin anchovies, is a genus of anchovies. These fish derive their name from the long, filamentous extension of the pectoral fins that is found in most species. It currently contains eight recognized species.

== Species ==
- Setipinna breviceps (Cantor, 1849) (Shorthead hairfin anchovy)
- Setipinna brevifilis (Valenciennes, 1848) (Short-finned hairfin anchovy)
- Setipinna melanochir (Bleeker, 1849) (Dusky Hairfin anchovy)
- Setipinna paxtoni Wongratana, 1987 (Humpback hairfin anchovy)
- Setipinna phasa (F. Hamilton, 1822) (Gangetic hairfin anchovy)
- Setipinna taty (Valenciennes, 1848) (Scaly hairfin anchovy)
- Setipinna tenuifilis (Valenciennes, 1848) (Common hairfin anchovy)
- Setipinna wheeleri Wongratana, 1983 (Burma hairfin anchovy)
