= Tiradito =

Peruvian dish of raw fish

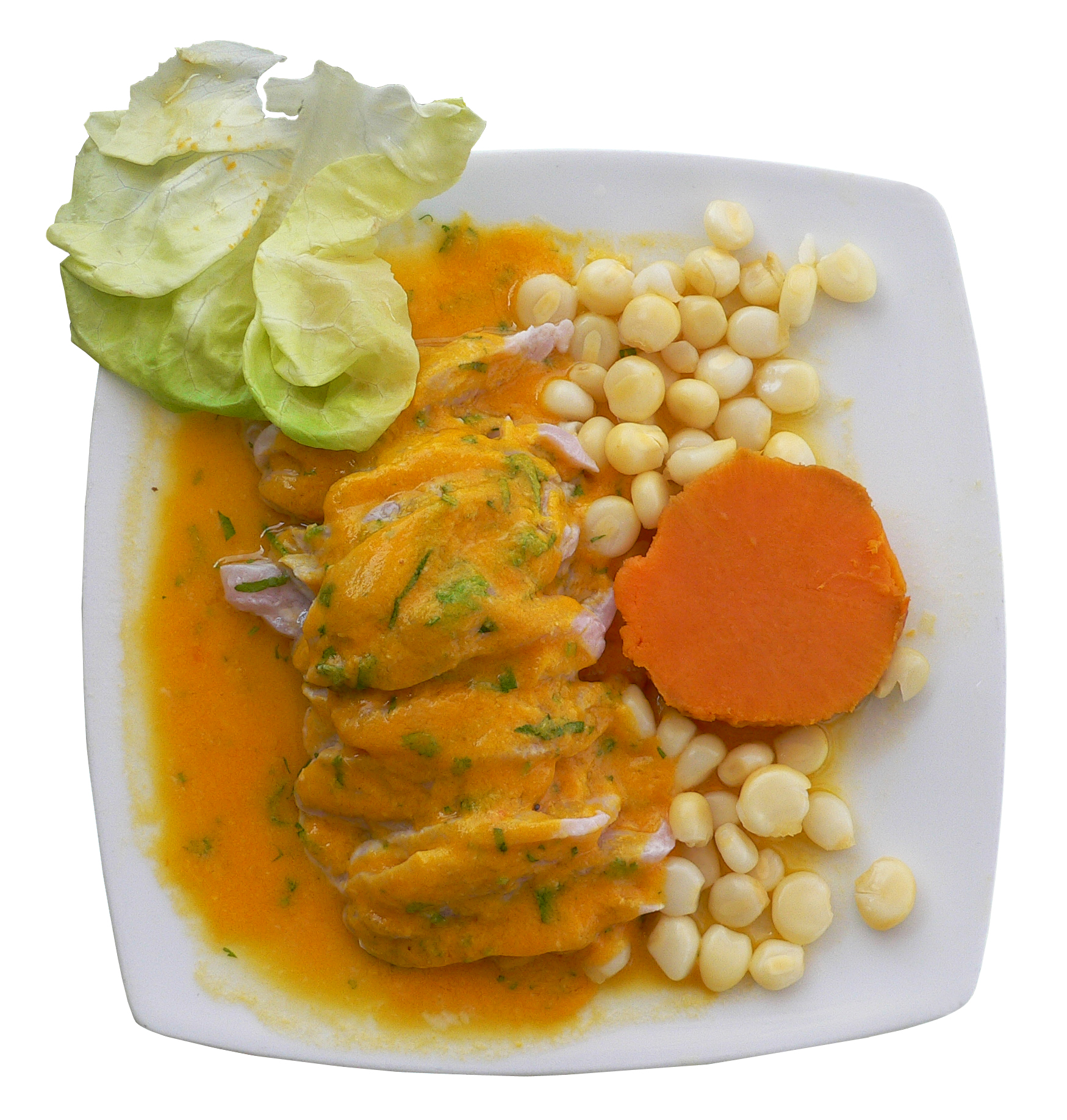
Tiradito of Lima

Tiradito is a Peruvian dish of raw fish, cut in the shape of sashimi, and of aspect similar to crudo, and carpaccio, in a spicy sauce. It reflects the influence of Japanese immigrants on Peruvian cuisine. Tiradito differs from ceviche in two ways: tiradito is sliced, while ceviche is cubed; and tiradito is sauced immediately before service, hence raw, while ceviche is marinated beforehand, hence "cooked". Some authors also state that tiradito does not contain onions, but this is not universal.

Common garnishes include sweet potato and boiled corn. Stylized variants may include such ingredients as scallops, and a small amount of searing.
