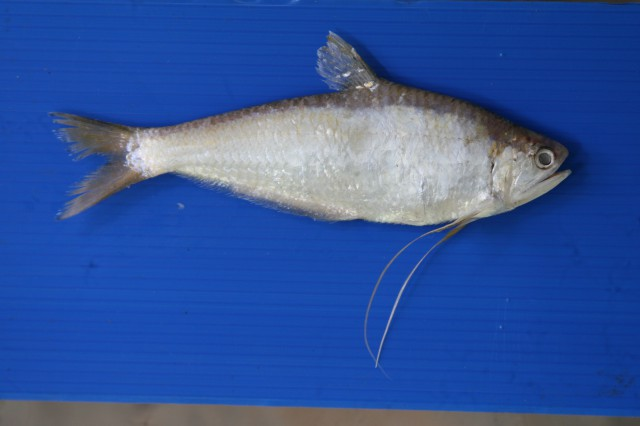

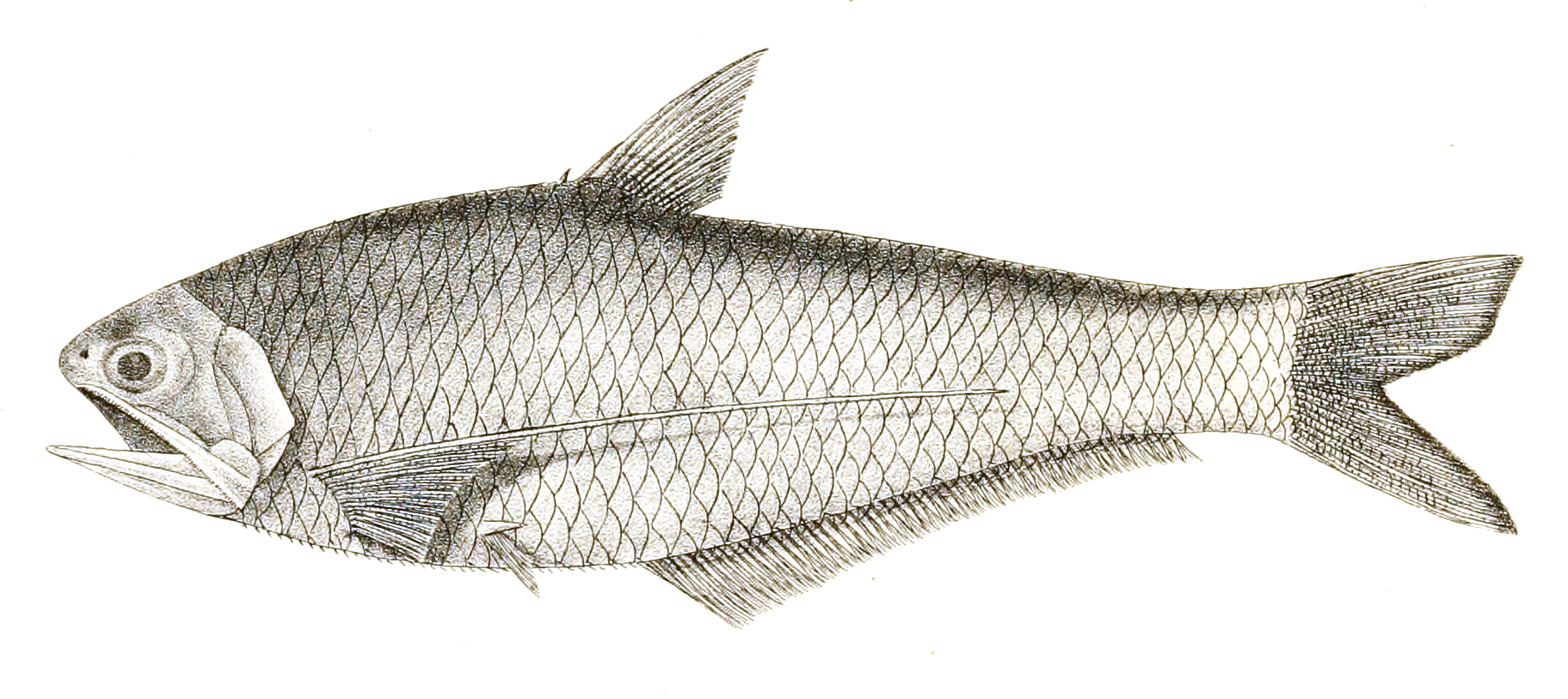
- Setipinna taty

Scientific classification
- Domain: Eukaryota
- Kingdom: Animalia
- Phylum: Chordata
- Class: Actinopterygii
- Order: Clupeiformes
- Family: Engraulidae
- Genus: Setipinna
- Species: S. taty

Binomial name
- Setipinna taty (Valenciennes, 1848)

= Setipinna taty =

Scaly hairfin anchovy

Species of ray-finned fish

The scaly hairfin anchovy (Setipinna taty) is a species of ray-finned fish in the family Engraulidae. It is found in coastal waters and estuaries in the tropical western Indo-Pacific region.
