= Sashimi =

Japanese dish of raw fish

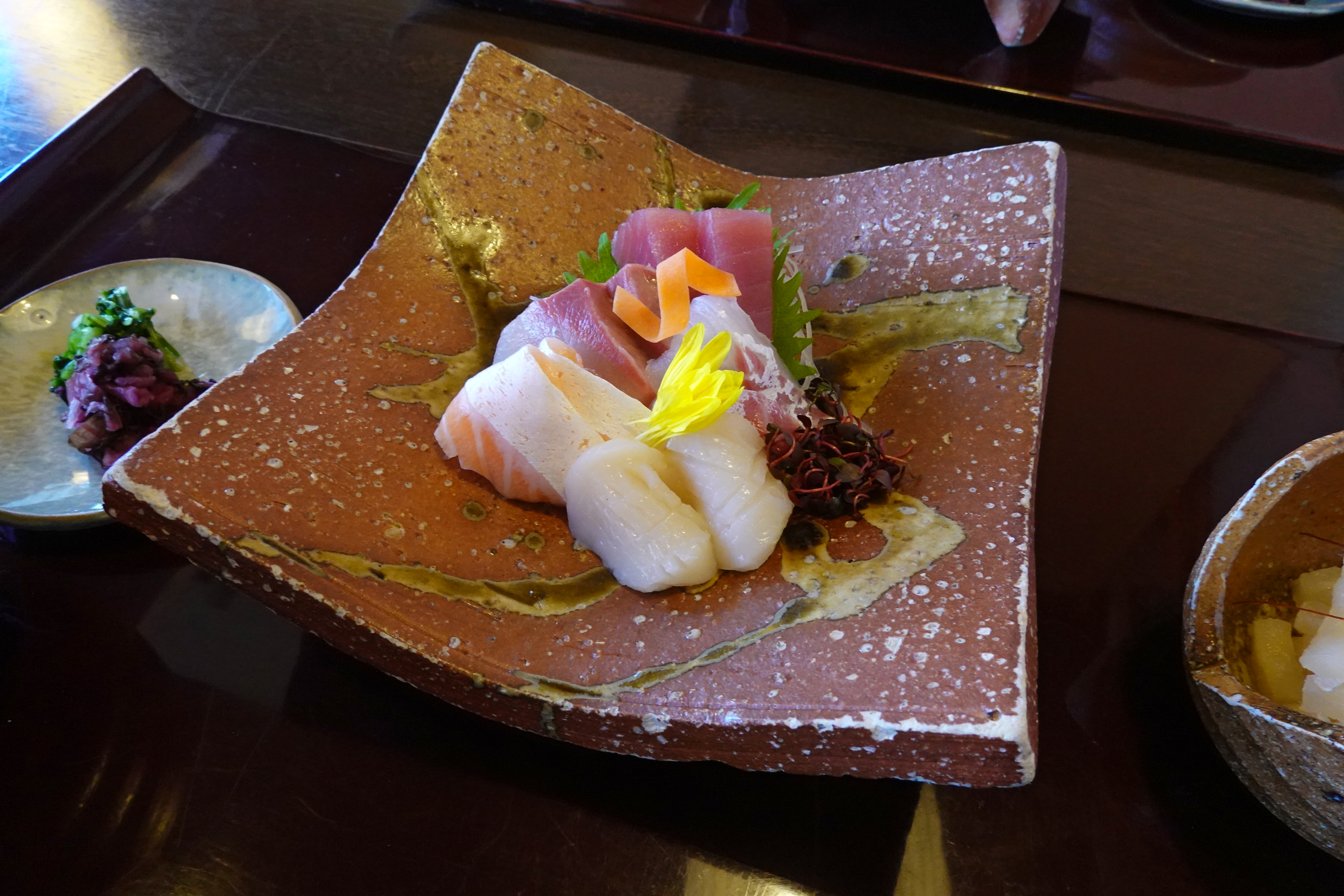
Sashimi on a Shigaraki ware plate

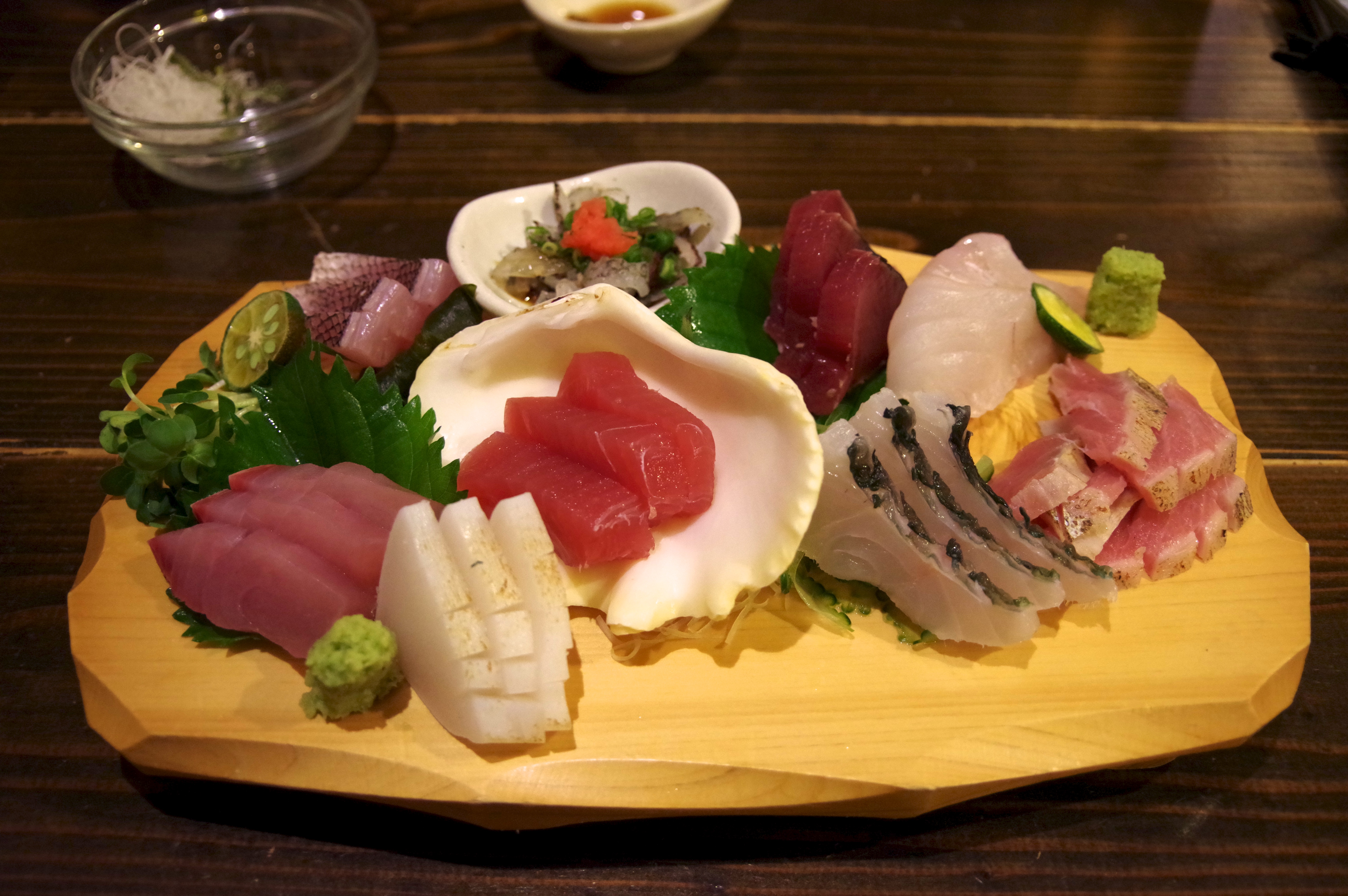
Sashimi combo of slices of assorted fish, served on a wooden plate

Sashimi (刺身; English: /sæ.ˈʃiːm.i, sɑː-, sə-/, Japanese: [sa.ɕi.mʲí]) is a Japanese dish that consists of fresh raw fish or other raw meat that is sliced into thin pieces, and is often eaten with soy sauce.

== Origin ==
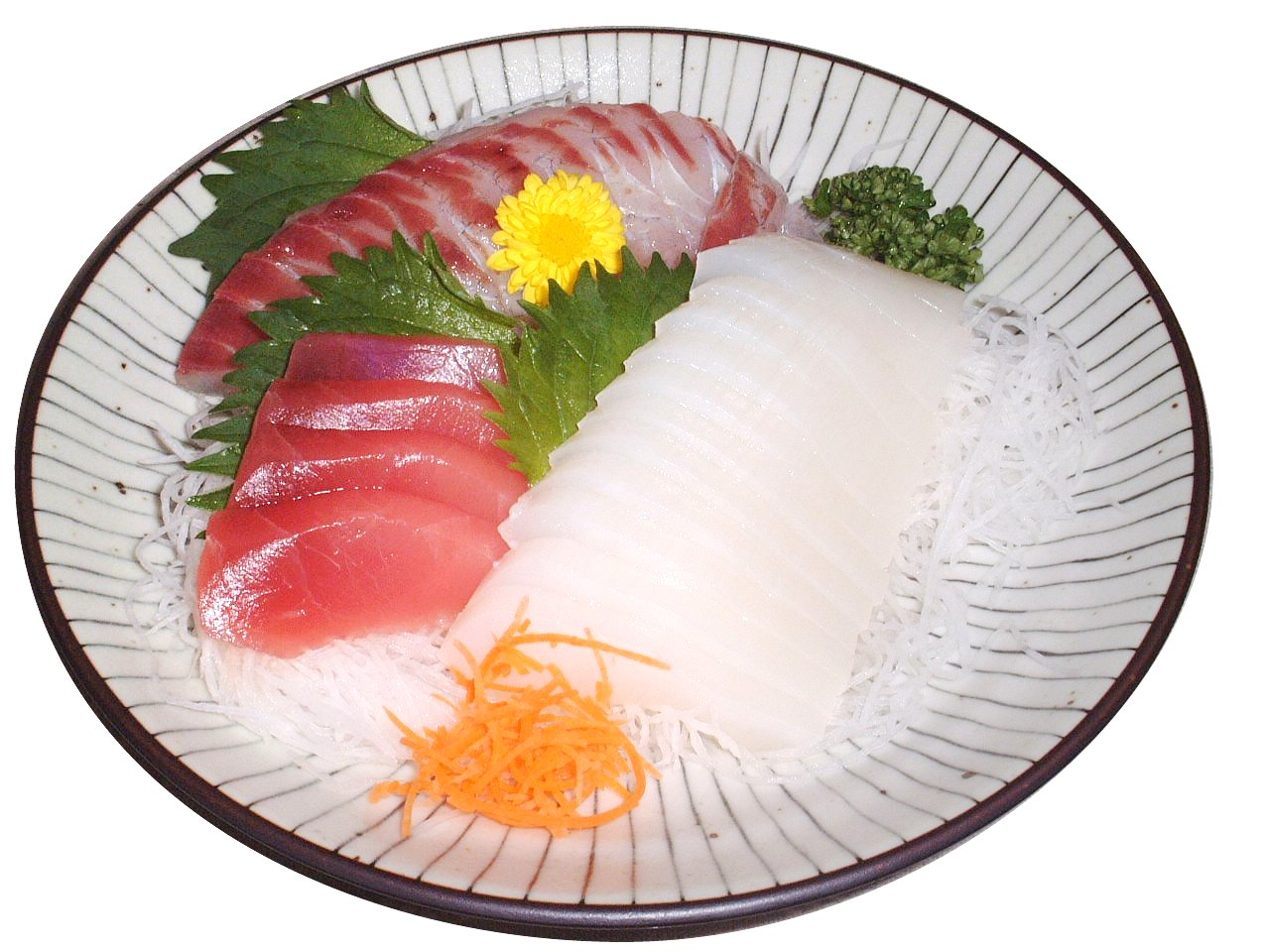
Assorted sashimi: tuna, cuttlefish, and seabream

The word sashimi means 'pierced body', a combination of 刺し (sashi, pierced, stuck) and 身 (mi, body, meat). This word was coined during the Muromachi period (1336–1573) and there are multiple theories as to its etymology:

A possibility for the name is the traditional method of harvesting. "Sashimi-grade" fish is caught by individual handline. As soon as the fish is landed, its brain is pierced with a sharp spike, and it is placed in slurried ice. This spiking is called the ikejime process, and the instant death means that the fish's flesh contains a minimal amount of lactic acid. This means that the fish will keep fresh on ice for longer without turning white or otherwise degrading.

Many non-Japanese use the terms sashimi and sushi interchangeably, but while they are frequently served at the same establishments, the two dishes are distinct. Sushi refers to any dish made with vinegared rice. While raw fish is a traditional sushi ingredient, many sushi dishes contain cooked seafood, and others have no seafood at all, including ingredients like seaweed, vegetables, omelets, and fried tofu. Sashimi, by contrast, is always served on its own.. An early Japanese cookbook, written in 1489, directs that the raw flesh should be sliced and mixed with vinegar and seasonings such as salt and herbs.

An early western description of sashimi comes from a letter written by the future Admiral of the Fleet, Sir Arthur Wilson of the Royal Navy, who was assigned to the British naval mission to Japan in the late 1860s: "It is a peculiar sort of fish, which they cut in very thin slices and serve up with some sort of sauce over it. It is considered a great delicacy. I have tried it and did not find it bad, but the idea is not nice."

== Serving ==
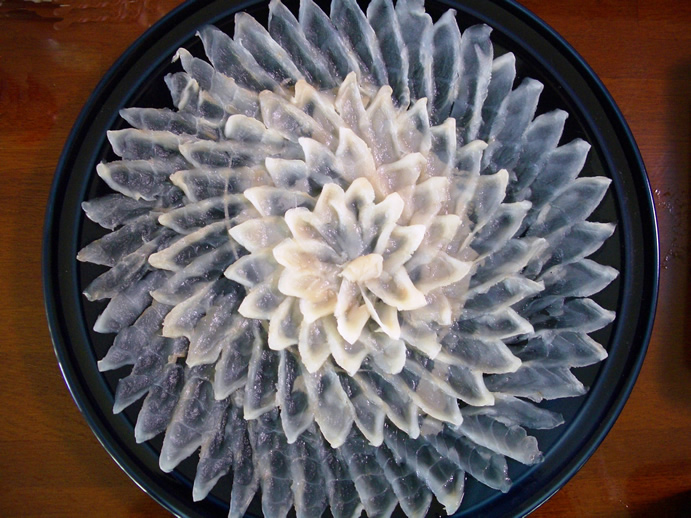
Plate of fugu sashimi (thinly sliced puffer fish)

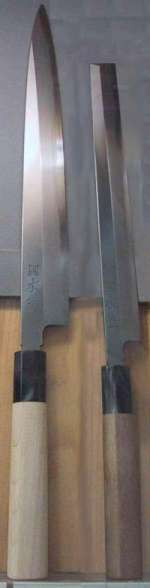
Sashimibōchō kitchen knives for sashimi

Sashimi is often served early in a formal Japanese meal, but it can also be served as a sashimi set meal, presented with rice (ご飯) and miso soup (味噌汁) in separate bowls. Japanese chefs consider sashimi the finest dish in Japanese formal dining, and recommend eating it before other strong flavors affect the palate.

The sliced seafood that composes the main ingredient is typically draped over a garnish. The typical garnish is Asian white radish, daikon, shredded into long thin strands, or single leaves of the herb shiso (perilla). Garnishes for sashimi are generally called tsuma, and may also include slices of other raw vegetables, such as cucumbers and carrots, as well as seaweed, and the flowers and leaves and stems of other plants.

Sashimi is popularly served with a dipping sauce (soy sauce) and condiments such as wasabi paste, grated fresh ginger, gari or pickled ginger, grated fresh garlic, or ponzu for meat sashimi, and such garnishes as shiso and shredded daikon radish. Wasabi paste is sometimes mixed directly into soy sauce as a dipping sauce, which is generally not done when eating sushi (which itself normally includes wasabi). A reputed motivation for serving wasabi with sashimi and also gari, besides its flavor, is killing harmful bacteria and parasites that could be present in raw seafood.

== Preparation ==
To highlight the delicate flavor and texture, the chef cuts fish into different thicknesses depending on the fish's variety, age, and season. The hira-zukuri cut (literally 'flat slice'), is the standard cut for most sashimi. Typically this style of cut is the size of a domino and 10 mm (3/8 in) thick. Tuna, salmon, and kingfish are most commonly cut in this style. The usu-zukuri cut (literally 'thin slice') is an extremely thin, diagonally cut slice that is mostly used to cut firm fish, such as bream, whiting, and flounder. The dimensions of this cut are usually 50 mm (2 in) long and 2 mm (1/16 in) wide. The kaku-zukuri cut (literally 'square slice') is the style in which sashimi is cut into small cubes that are 20 mm (3/4 in) on each side. The ito-zukuri cut (literally 'thread slice') is the style in which the fish is cut into fine strips, less than 2 mm (1/16 in) in diameter. The fish typically cut with the ito-zukuri style include garfish and squid; squid dish prepared in ito-zukuri is also called ika sōmen and is dipped in dashi or men-tsuyu, in the same way as sōmen (white flour noodles).

== Varieties ==
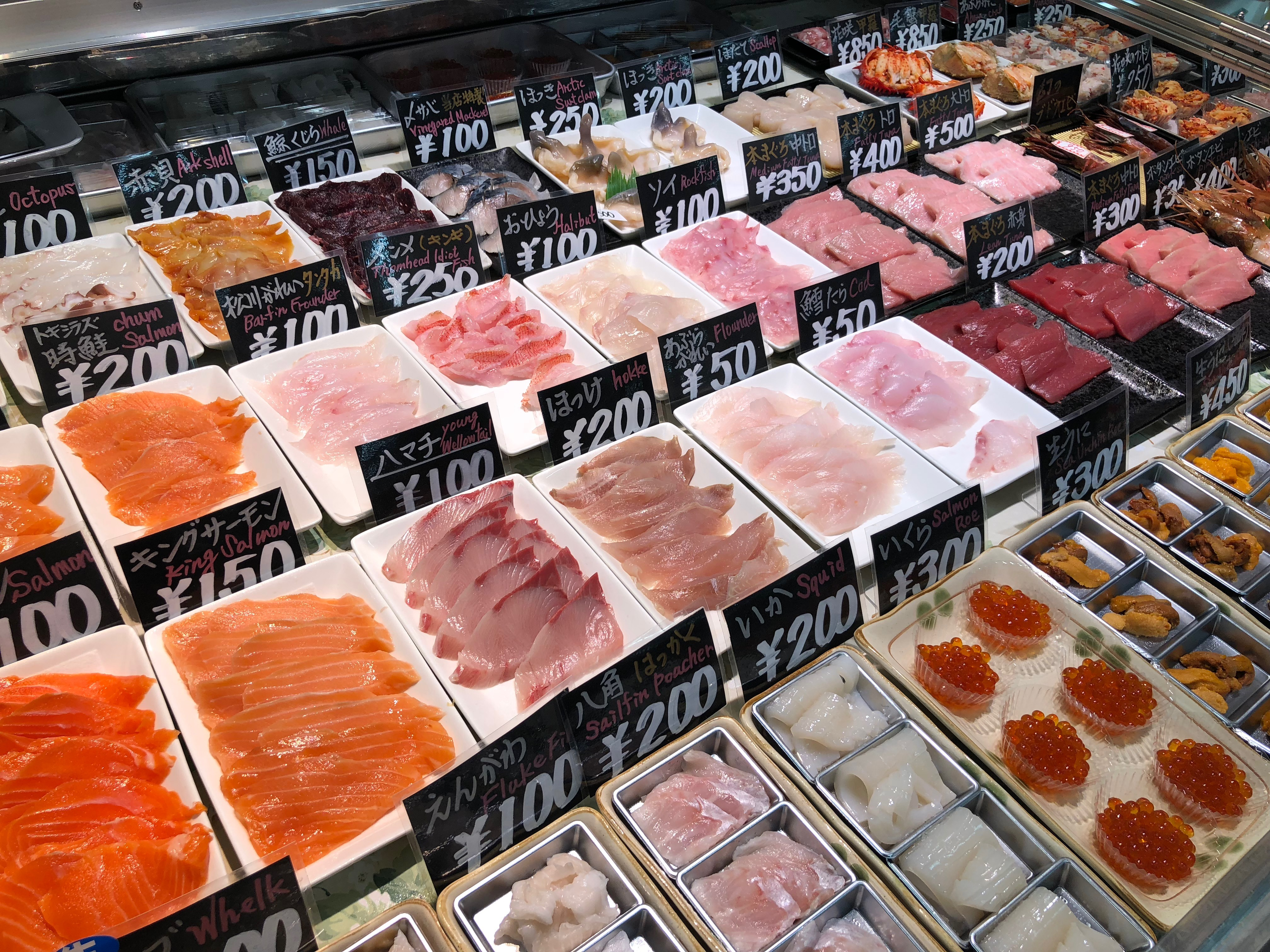
A large variety of sashimi being sold in Hokkaido

Popular main ingredients for sashimi include:

- Salmon (鮭, Sake)
- Squid (いか, Ika)
- Shrimp (えび, Ebi)
- Tuna (マグロ, Maguro)
- Mackerel (さば, Saba)
- Horse mackerel (あじ, Aji)
- Octopus (たこ, Tako)
- Fatty tuna (おおとろ, Ōtoro)
- Yellowtail (はまち, Hamachi)
- Scallop (ほたて貝, Hotate-gai)
- Sea urchin (ウニ, Uni)
- flatfish fin(えんがわ, Engawa)

Some sashimi ingredients, such as octopus, are sometimes served cooked given their chewiness. Most seafood, such as tuna, salmon, and squid, are served raw. Tataki ('pounded') is a type of sashimi that is quickly and lightly seared on the outside, leaving it raw inside.

=== Ingredients other than raw fish meat ===
Food that is cut into small pieces and eaten with wasabi and soy sauce may be called sashimi in Japan, including the following ingredients. Like bamboo shoots, the food is eaten raw to appreciate its freshness, and producers and farmers offer sashimi at their properties in top season. Some vegetables are eaten as thin-sliced strips and called sashimi since they resemble fish meat, like avocado as salmon and konnyaku as pufferfish.

Less common, but not unusual, sashimi ingredients are vegetarian items, such as yuba (bean curd skin), and raw red meats, such as beef or horse (known as basashi). Chicken "sashimi" (known as toriwasa) is considered by some people to be a delicacy. Chicken sashimi is sometimes slightly braised or seared on the outside.

Vegetable

- Avocado: served as "avocado sashimi", it is considered to have a texture that is similar to raw or slightly salted fatty salmon. It is eaten with wasabi soy sauce.
- Bamboo shoots: Bamboo grove farmers serve takenoko in the course menu, and sashimi is almost always sold during the high season of harvest.
- Japanese radish: among wide varieties of vegetables that are eaten fresh, it is said that the flavor stands out when tasted within a couple of hours after harvesting, and is called sashimi vegetables instead of very fresh salad.
- Konnyaku: cut into short thin strips which resemble puffer fish meat, thus called yama fugu (mountain puffer fish) in some regions. It is served with vinegar and miso, or wasabi and soy sauce, or vinegar and soy sauce.
- Yuba, or tofu skin: while there are restaurants where customers cook their own yuba and eat it while it is hot, yuba-sashi or sashimi of yuba is chilled and served with wasabi soy sauce or vinegar miso.

Meat

Beef, pork, and poultry are bought from licensed butchers and processors and served raw or slightly cooked to avoid high risk of food poisoning and parasite infections. Meat may be treated in boiling water (yubiki) or braised with a gas torch (aburi). It is served with ponzu citrus vinegar.

- Chicken meat (toriwasa) is thinly sliced Nagoya kōchin flesh, liver, heart, and gizzard.
- Chiragaa: boiled face skin of pork, served with vinegar and miso sauce, also served as Okinawa cuisine.
- Goat meat: Okinawa cuisine, served with soy sauce and grated ginger.
- Horse meat: offered with grated garlic and soy sauce.
- Mimigaa: boiled ears of pork, also served as Okinawa cuisine.
- Offal: advised to buy from meat processors or restaurants with licenses, as fatal food poisoning happened in Japan with beef liver. (Note: Japanese regulation has banned providing or selling raw beef liver for sashimi at restaurants or stores, due to the risk of Hepatitis E and Enterohemorrhagic Escherichia coli, since July 2012.) (Note: With cases reported in 2012, Ministry of Health, Labour and Welfare banned beef liver from being served as sashimi after 12 cases of food poisoning were reported. The regulation was tightened in 2015 and pork liver was added to banned offal.)
- Wild meat: boar as Okinawa cuisine consumed on Iriomote and Ishigaki islands and boiled meat is served. Deer meat.

Others

- Fishcake: An item in the express menu of Izakaya, offered as Itawasa. Sliced into 1 centimetre (0.39 in) thick strips, and eaten with wasabi and soy sauce.
- Seaweed: wakame is, in the strict sense, not eaten raw but dipped in boiling water for a few seconds, and eaten with wasabi and soy sauce. Marinating with vinegar and miso sauce is popular as well.
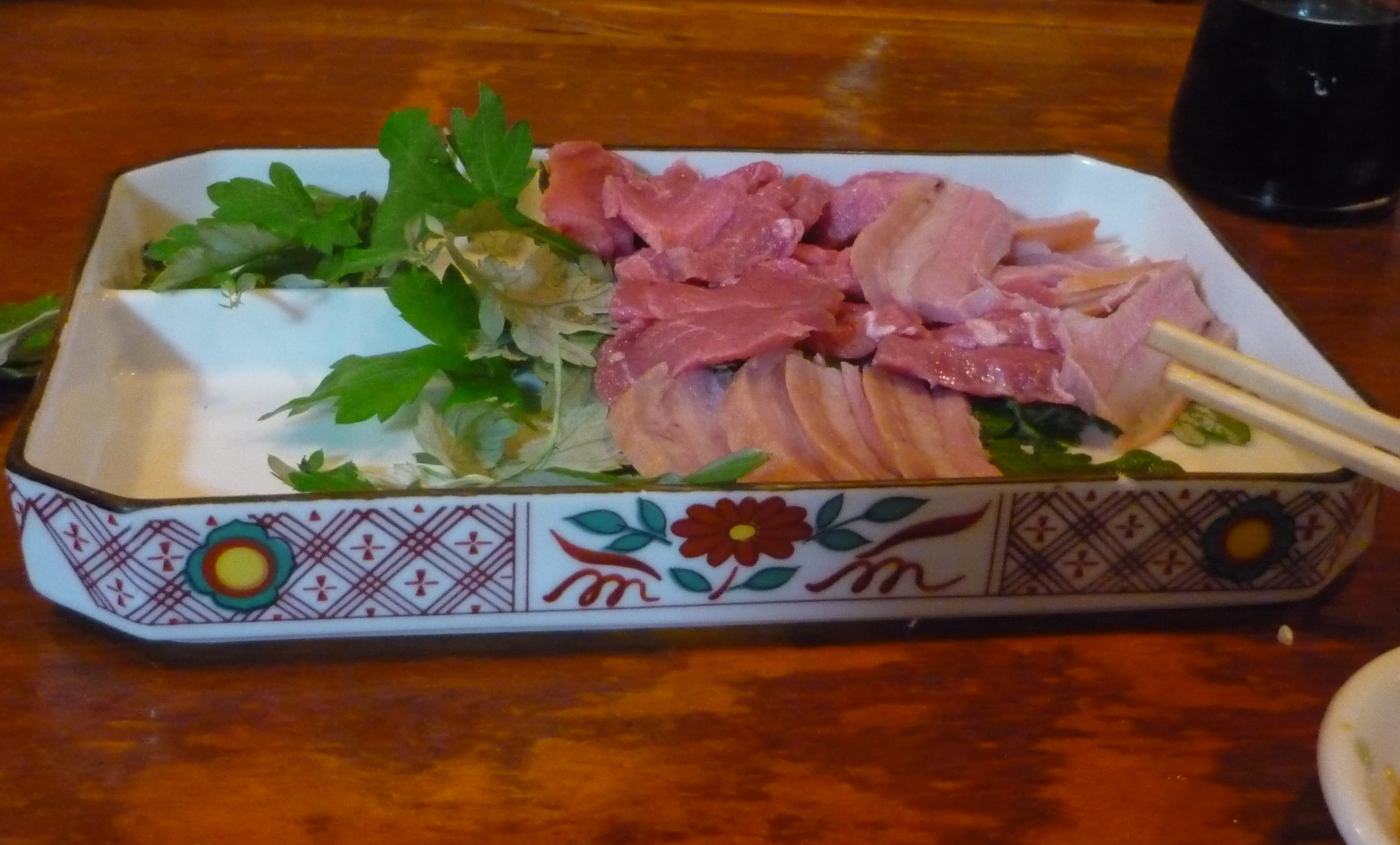
Goat meat served raw as sashimi

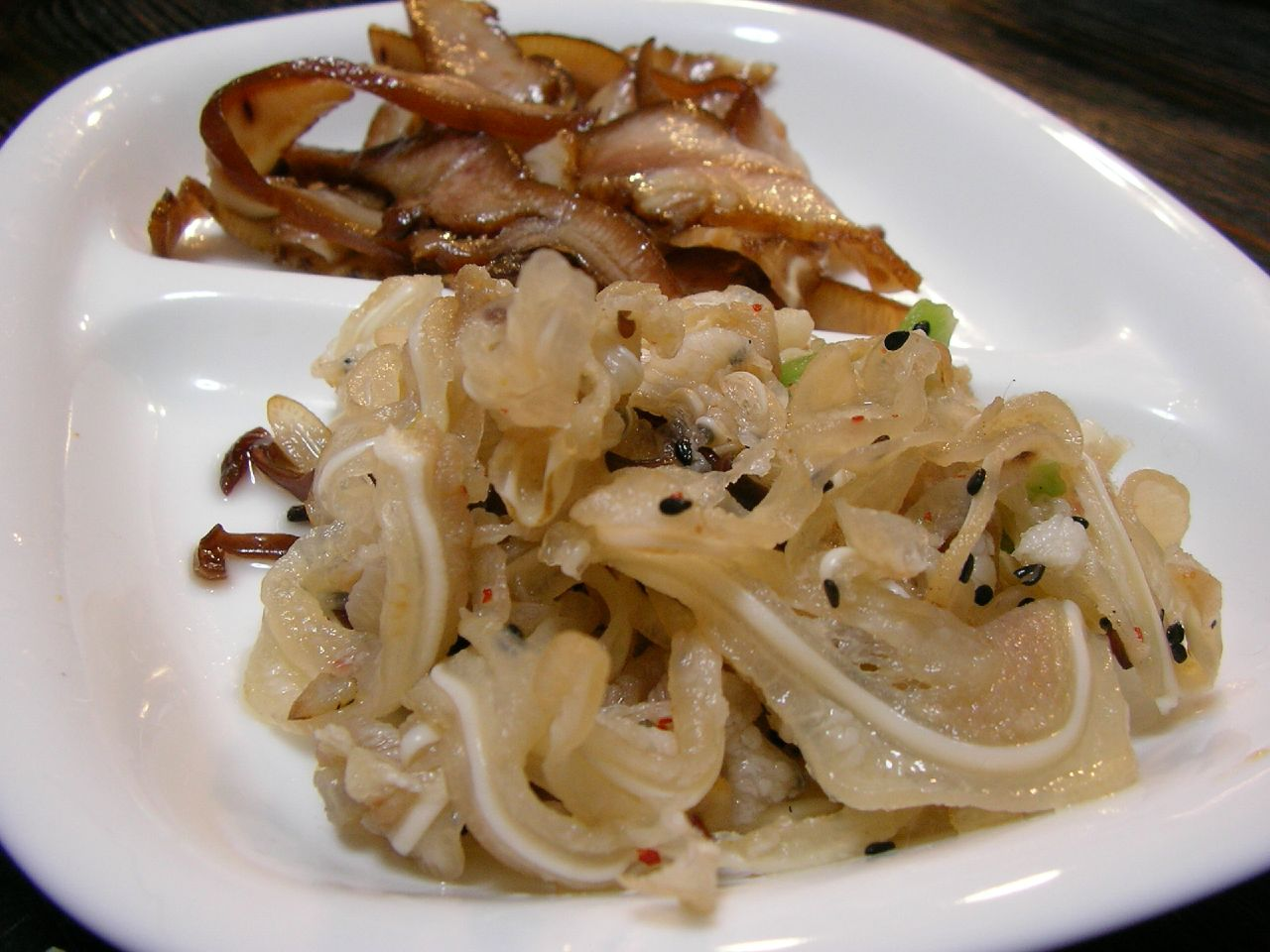
Thinly sliced "mimigā" (near) and "chiragā" (far)

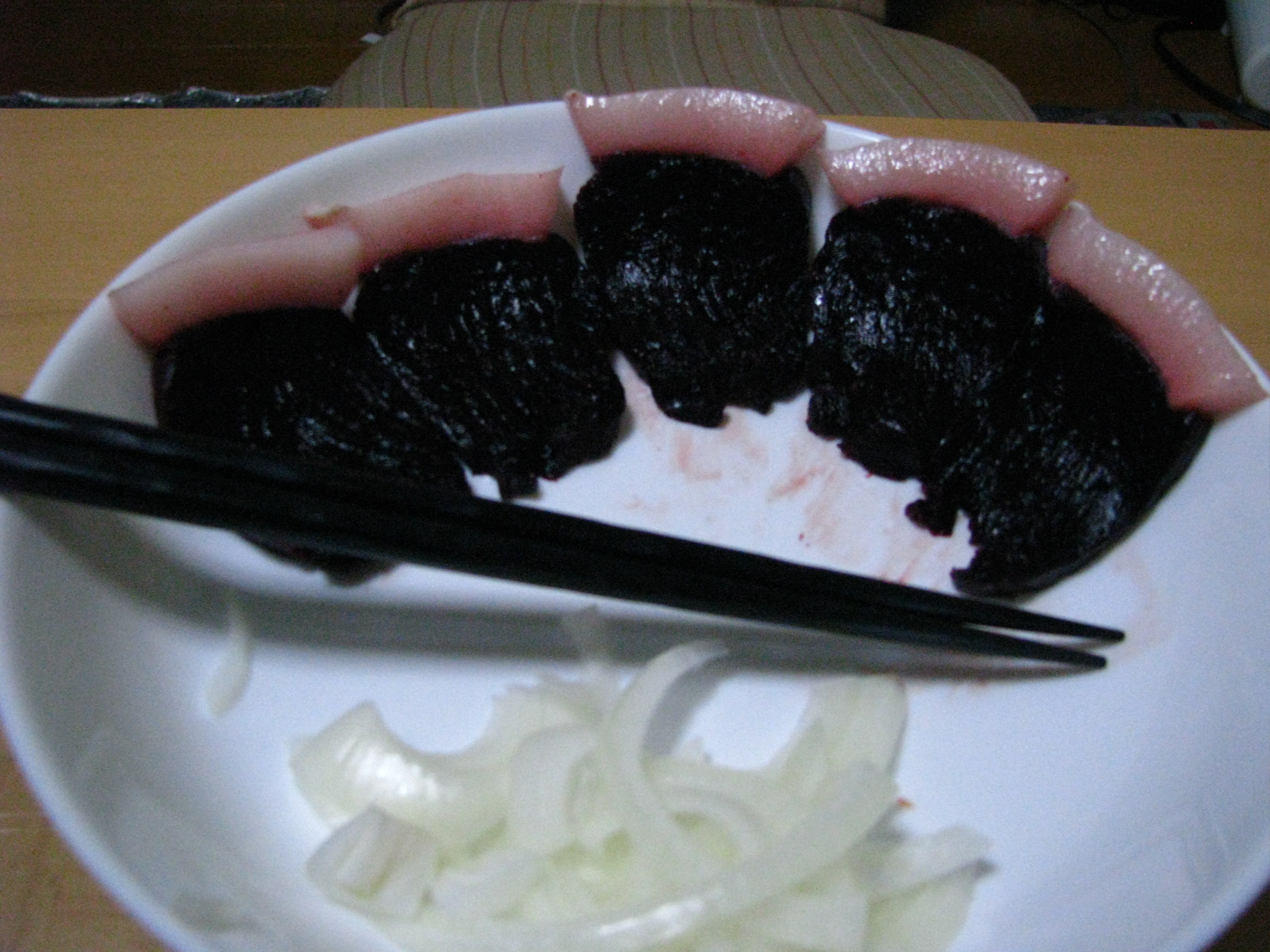
A plate of dolphin sashimi

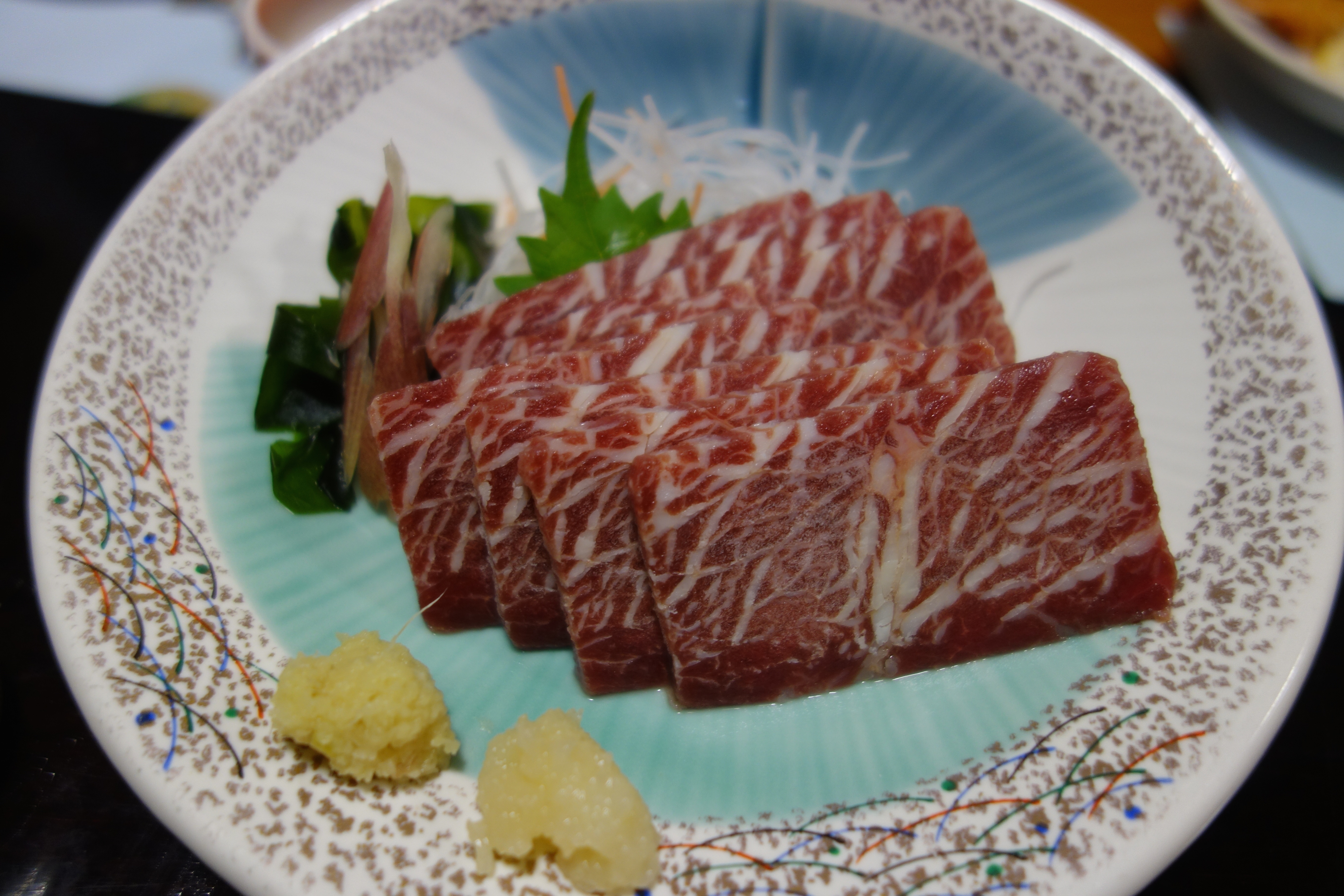
A plate of horse sashimi (basashi)

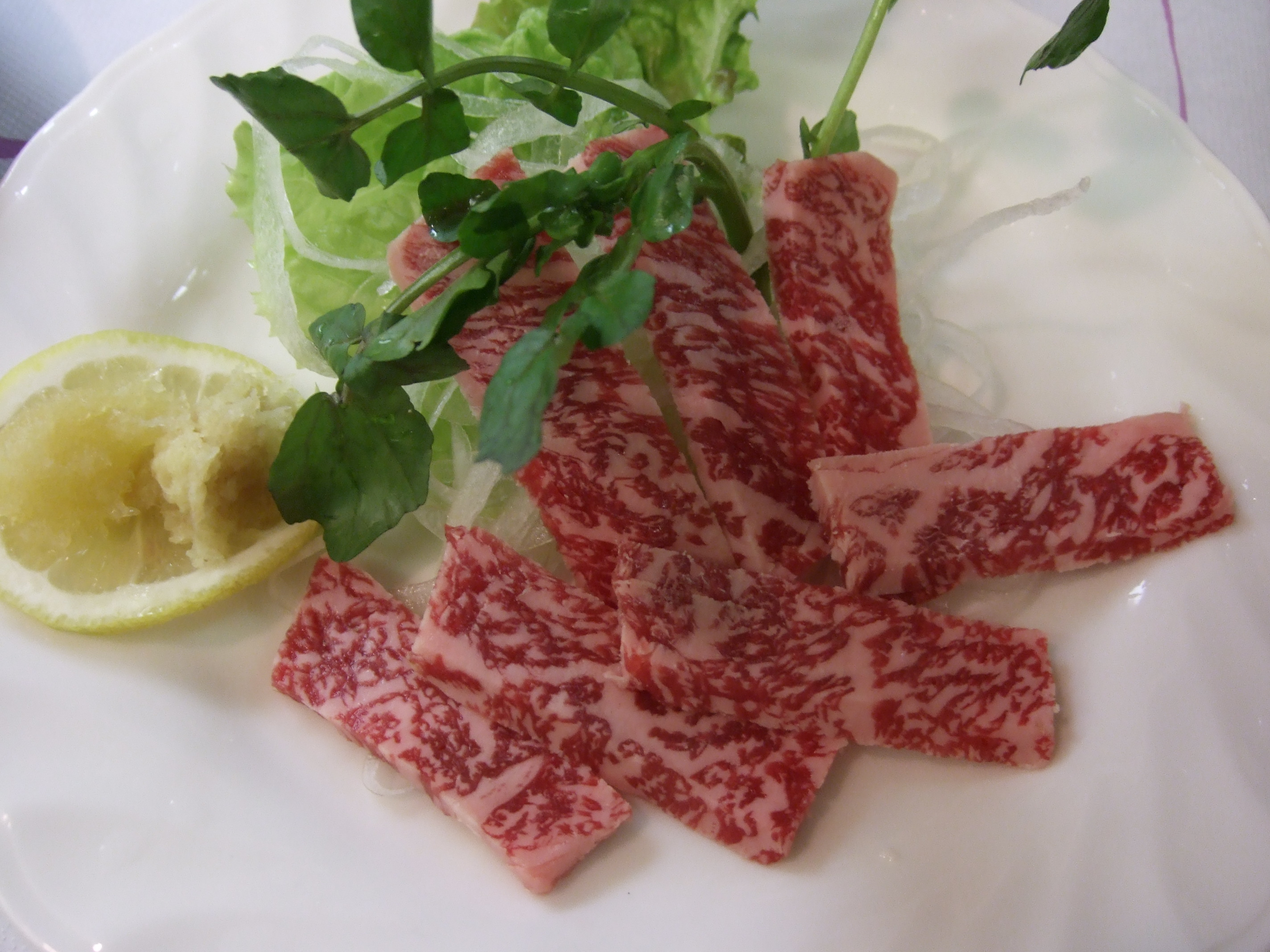
Beef sashimi

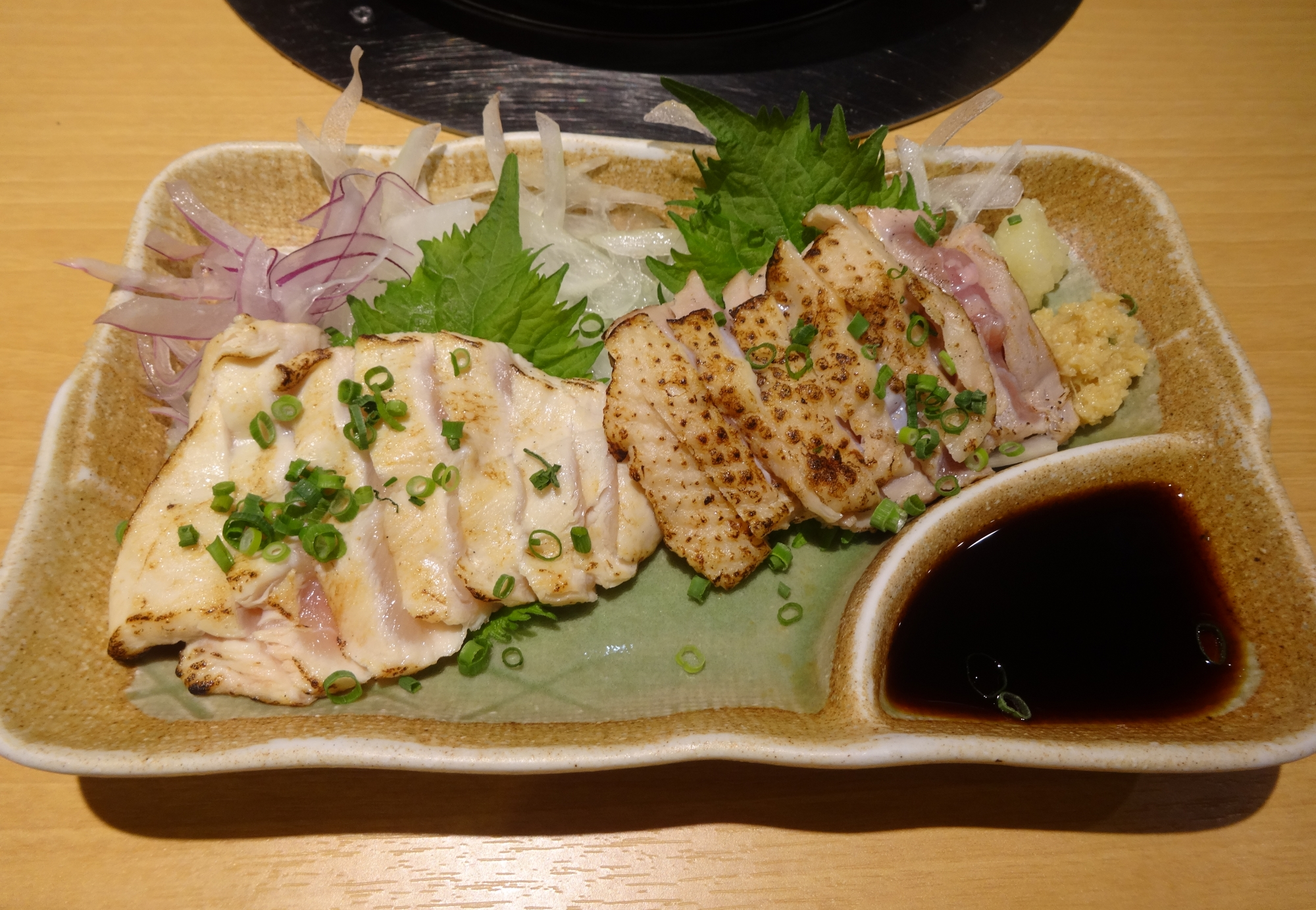
Chicken sashimi served lightly braised as tataki

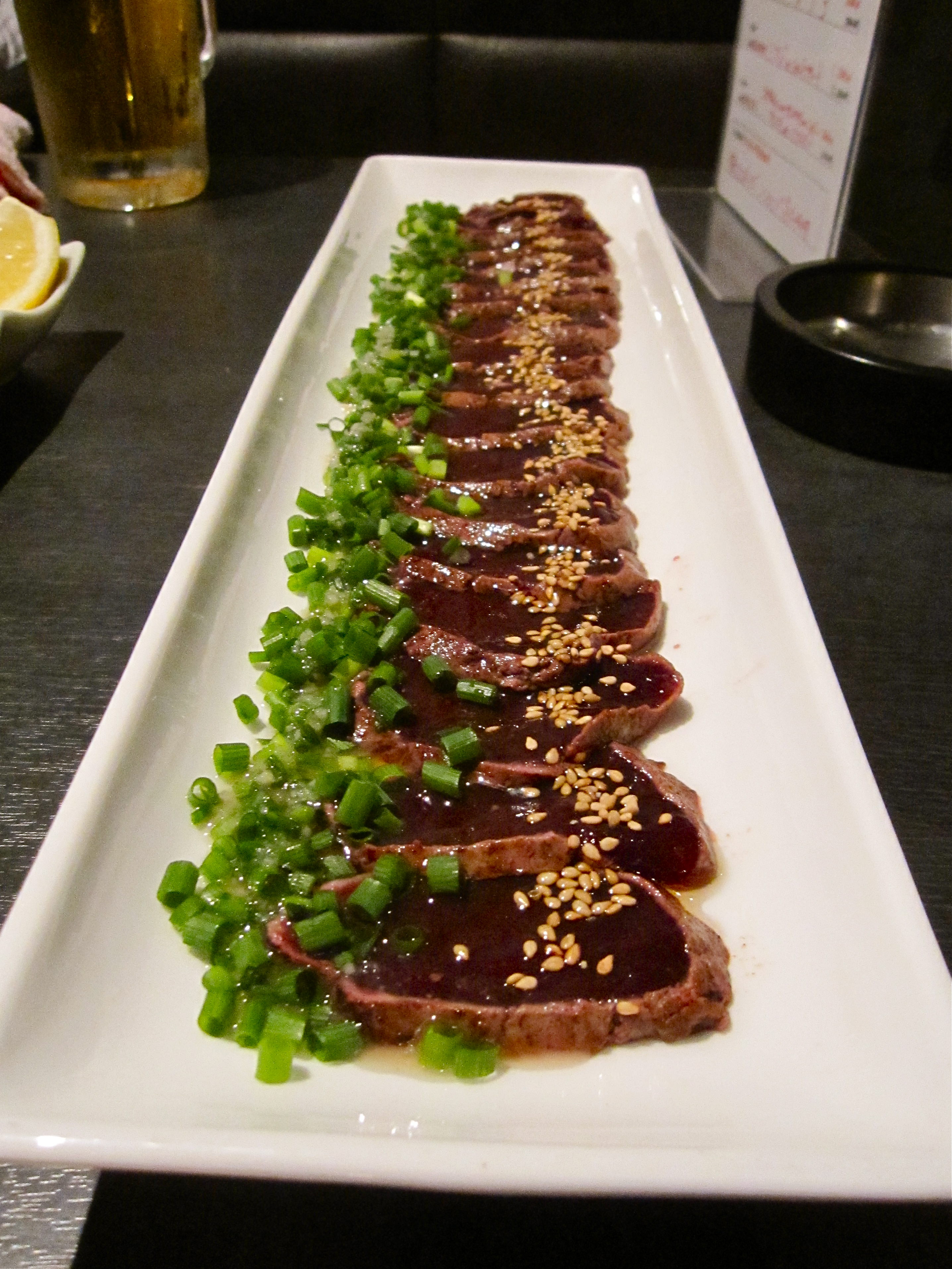
Beef liver sashimi served with sesame seed oil and salt

== Safety ==
As a raw food, consuming sashimi can result in foodborne illness when bacteria or parasites are present. For example, anisakiasis is a disease that is caused by the accidental ingestion of larval nematodes in the family Anisakidae, primarily Anisakis simplex, but also Pseudoterranova decipiens. In addition, incorrectly prepared fugu fish may contain tetrodotoxin, a potent neurotoxin.

Another type of foodborne illness that could occur after consuming tainted sashimi is diphyllobothriasis. This disease is an intestinal infection from consuming the tapeworm Diphyllobothrium latum. Common fish such as trout, salmon, pike, and sea bass harbor this parasitic larva in their muscles. Since the innovation of the chilled transport system, paired with the increased consumption of salmon and trout, an increasing number of cases have been recorded annually in northern Japan due to the spread of this disease.

Traditionally, fish that spend at least part of their lives in brackish or fresh water were considered unsuitable for sashimi because of the possibility of parasites. For example, salmon, an anadromous fish, is not traditionally eaten straight out of the river. A study in Seattle, Washington showed that all wild salmon had roundworm larvae that are capable of infecting people, while farm-raised salmon did not have any roundworm larvae. However, a study commissioned by the Pew Foundation found that total organic contaminants were consistently and significantly more concentrated in the farmed salmon as a group than in wild salmon.

Freezing is often used to kill parasites. According to a European Union Regulation No. 843/2004, freezing fish at −20 °C (−4 °F) for 24 hours kills parasites. (Note: The requirement for frozen products was removed from Regulation (EC) No 853/2004 through an amendment made by Commission Regulation (EU) No 1020/2008. This amendment, adopted on 17 October 2008, modified certain provisions of the original regulation, including the rules concerning the freezing of products of animal origin. One of the key changes in this amendment was related to the removal of the blanket requirement for freezing certain products (like fishery products) before processing or distribution, allowing more flexibility for businesses in handling, storage, and distribution under certain conditions. This change was part of a broader effort to simplify the hygiene rules that apply to food businesses while maintaining food safety standards.) As of August 2024, the Fish and Fishery Products Hazards and Controls manual published by the U.S. Food and Drug Administration (FDA) recommends freezing at −35 °C (−31 °F) for 15 hours, or at −20 °C (−4 °F) for 7 days. (Note: The FDA advice also includes the caveat that "These conditions may not be suitable for freezing particularly large fish (e.g., thicker than 6 inches). It may be necessary for you to conduct a study to determine effective control parameters specific to your freezing method, fish thickness, fish species, method of preparation, and target parasites.")

While Canada does not federally regulate freezing fish, British Columbia and Alberta voluntarily adhere to guidelines that are similar to the FDA's. Ontario attempted to legislate freezing as part of raw food handling requirements. This was soon withdrawn due to industry protests that the subtle flavors and texture of raw fish would be destroyed by freezing. Instead, Ontario has decided to consider regulations on how raw fish must be handled before serving.

Some fish for sashimi are treated with carbon monoxide to keep the flesh red longer in storage. This practice can make spoiled fish appear fresh.

Eating chicken sashimi is a serious food poisoning risk. Despite it being on menus, it is hard to find, and many chefs cook it incorrectly. Chicken sashimi is also often sourced by certain restaurants from the thigh, liver, and outer breast.

== Environmental concerns ==
With the constant amount of fishing, bluefin tuna populations have been steadily declining. A proposed solution has been farming bluefin tuna in fisheries. Historically, this has posed a problem in that the captive fish are not raised from spawn. Rather, they are raised from small wild fish that are netted and transported to the farms, mostly in the Mediterranean. However, Japanese scientists have found a way to breed and raise the fish entirely in captivity successfully.

== See also ==
- Surimi
- Ikizukuri (live sashimi)
- Kuai (dish)
- Hoe (dish)
- Carpaccio
- Kinilaw
- Steak tartare
- Stroganina
- Tiradito
- List of raw fish dishes
- Mercury in fish
- Ceviche
- Yusheng
