= Botrytis =

Botrytis may refer to:

- Botrytis (fungus), the anamorphs of fungi of the genus Botryotinia
  - Botrytis cinerea, a mold important in wine making
- Botrytis, the cauliflower cultivar group of Brassica oleracea
