= Red onion =

Onion cultivar

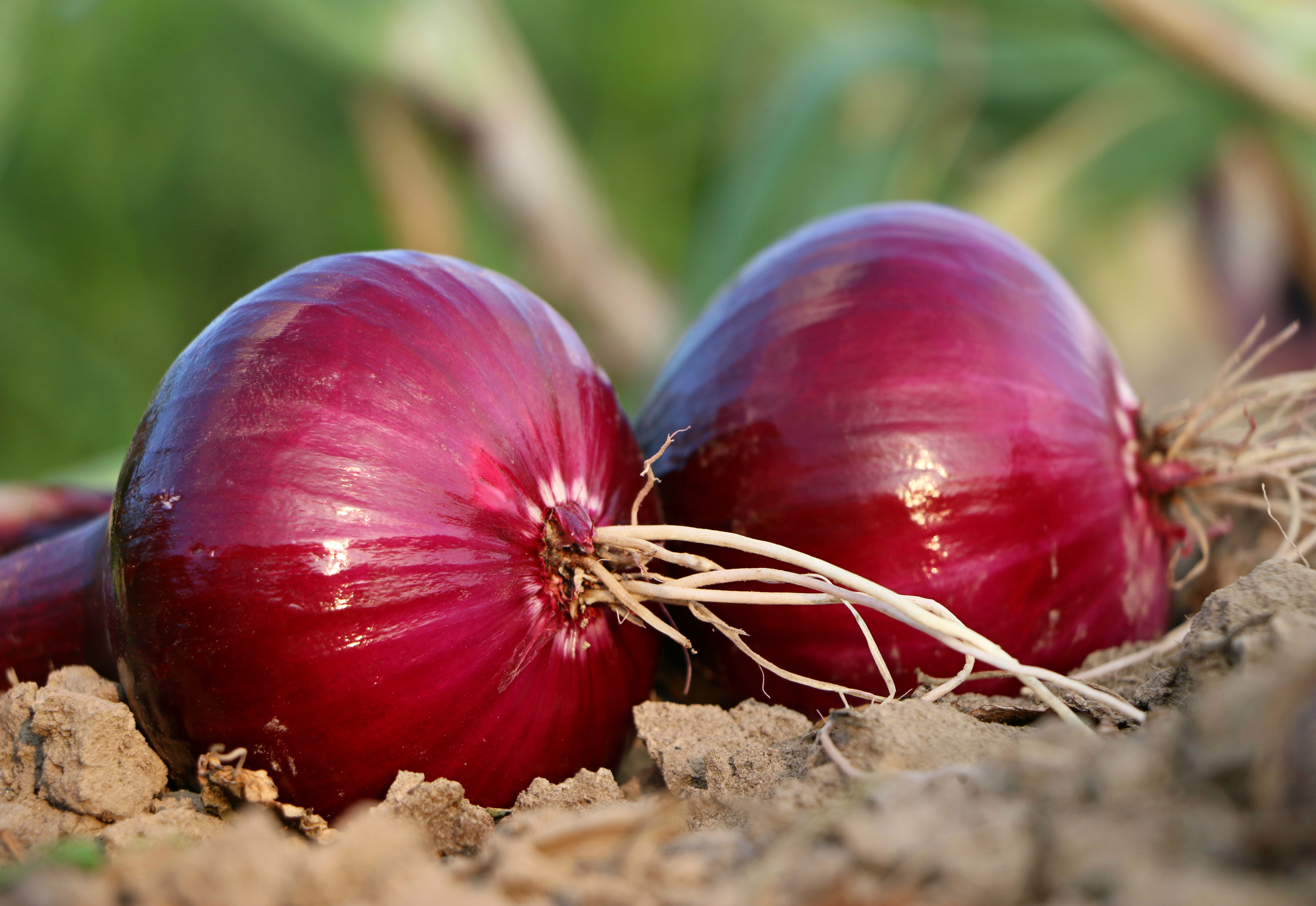
- A red onion
- Genus: Allium
- Species: Allium cepa

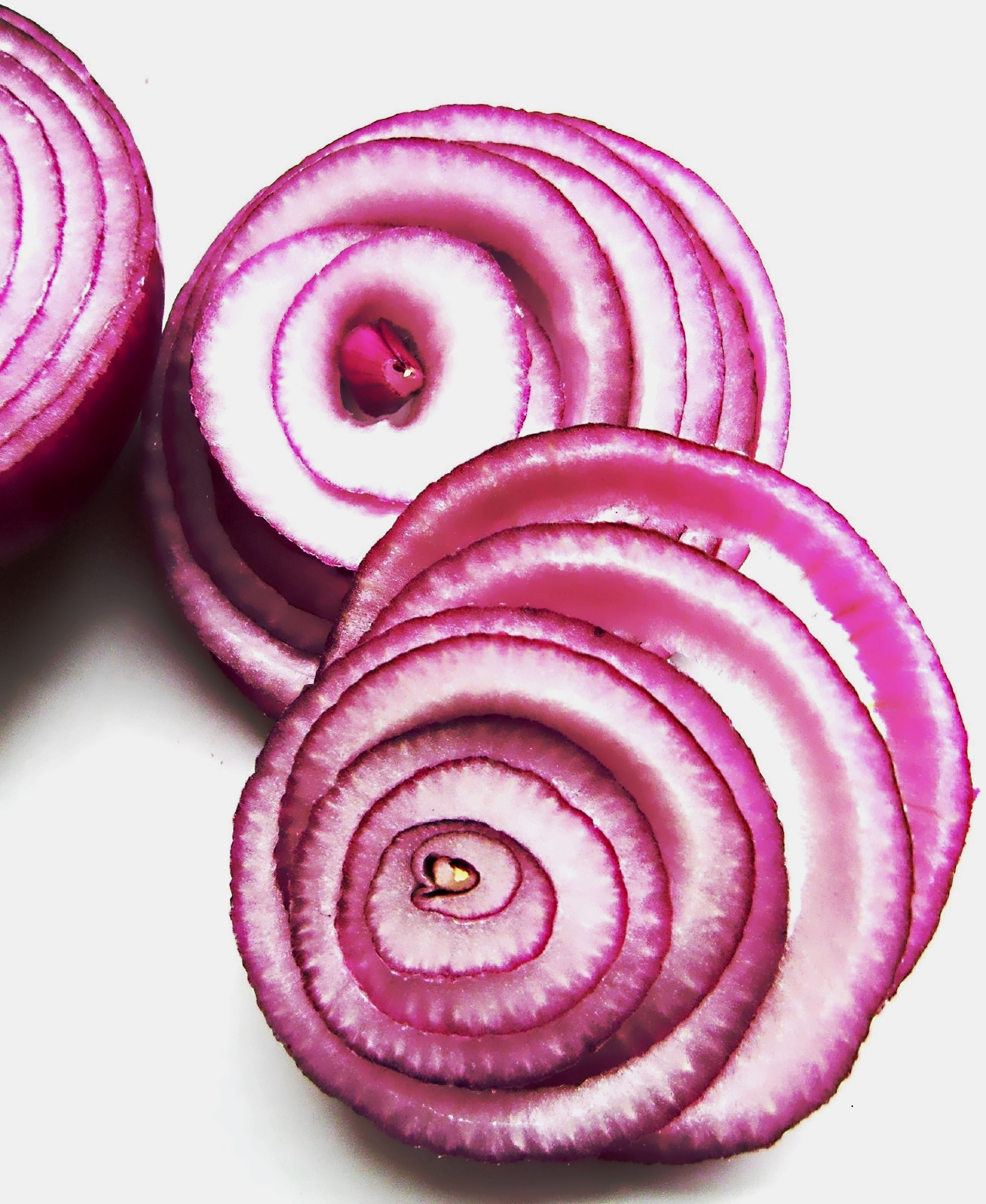
Cross sections of red onions

Red onions (also known as purple or blue onions in some mainland European countries) are cultivars of the onion (Allium cepa), and have purplish-red skin and white flesh tinged with red. They are most commonly used in cooking, but the skin has also been used as a dye.

Red onions tend to be medium to large in size and have a sweeter flavor than white or yellow onions due to low levels of pyruvic acid and sulfur compounds. They are often consumed raw (and can be added to salads for color and bite), grilled, or lightly cooked with other foods. Red onions are available throughout the year and are high in flavonoids and fiber (compared to white and yellow onions). Cut red onion can be soaked in cool water for a period of time, and the water can be drained off, resulting in less "bite" and pungency.

== Varieties ==
=== Red Baron ===
According to the Royal Horticultural Society (RHS), Red Baron is a "mid-to-late-cropping onion with dark red skin and firm, white flesh, each layer with a dark red rim. It has a good, strong flavour and stores well". Red Baron holds the RHS's Award of Garden Merit.

=== Tropea ===
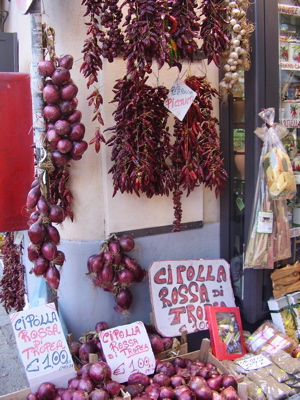
Rossa di Tropea for sale in Italy

The red onion from Tropea, Italy, (Italian: "Cipolla Rossa di Tropea") grows in a small area of Calabria in southern Italy, Capo Vaticano, near the city of Tropea. This onion has a stronger and sweeter aroma and the inner part is juicier and whiter than other red onions and it is possible to make a jam with it. In July 2007, the European Union registered the Protected geographical indication mark for the red onions produced in this particular area in Italy.

=== Turda ===
The red onion from Turda (Cluj County, Central Romania) (Romanian: "Ceapa de Turda",) is a local variety of red onion with light sweeter taste and particular aroma. The area of cultivation encompass the lower Arieș valley and the middle Mureș valley.

Turda onion bulbs are traditionally intertwined into long strings (1–2 m) for marketing purposes and can be found at the traditional markets all over central Romania. "Turda Red Onion" is usually served fresh, as a salad or part of mixed salads and especially as a compulsory garnish for the traditional bean-and-smoked ham soups.

=== Wethersfield ===
In the United States, one of the most prominent cultivars of red onion was grown in Wethersfield, Connecticut, and was a major source of onions for New England until the late 1800s.
