= Tokwa't baboy =

Filipino dish

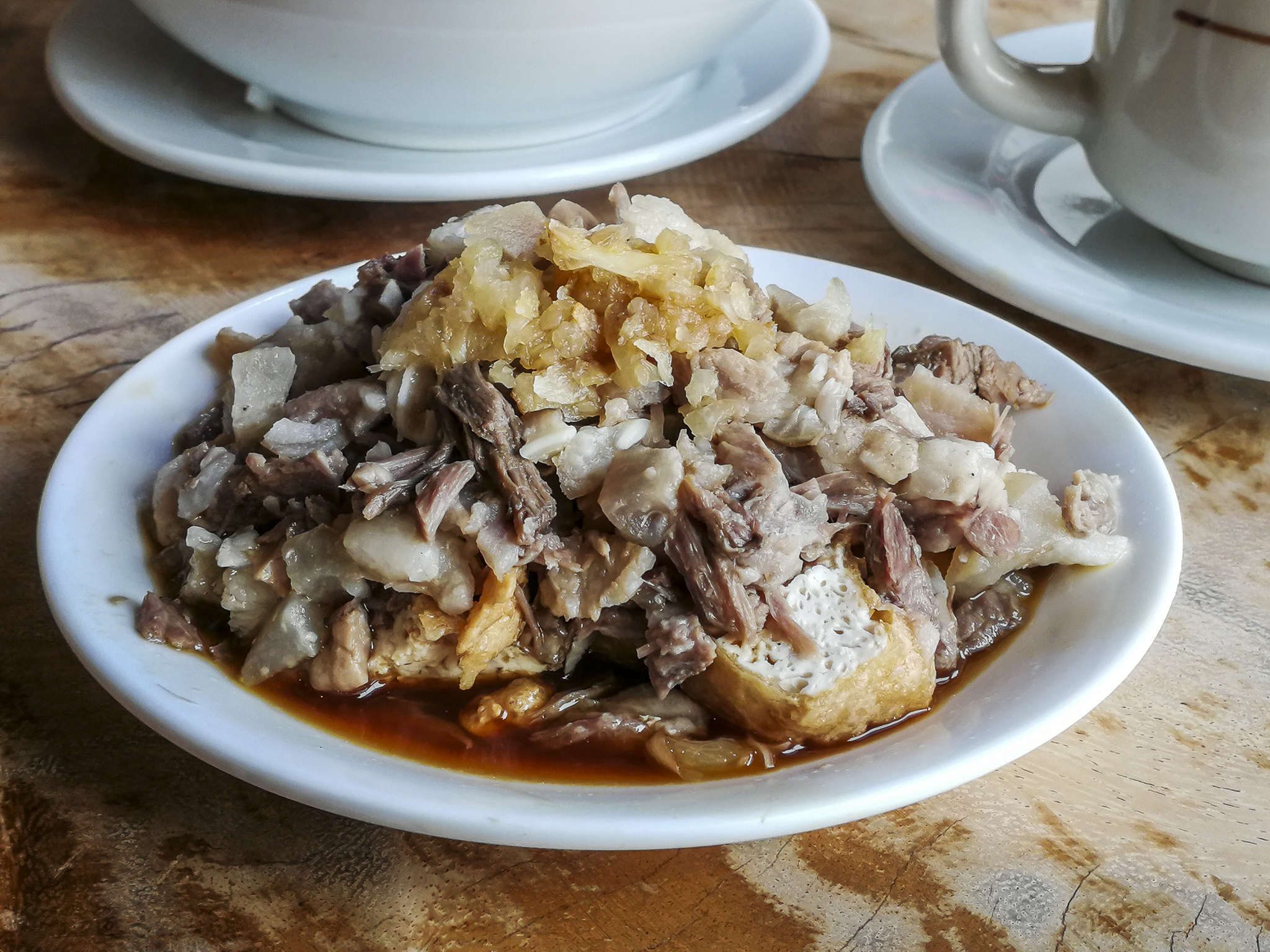
- Tokwa't Baboy
- Type: Appetizer, snack
- Course: Hors d'oeuvre
- Place of origin: Philippines
- Region or state: Cavite
- Serving temperature: Warm, room temperature
- Main ingredients: Pork ears and/or pork belly, tofu Dip: soy sauce, pork broth, vinegar, white onions, scallions, red or green chili peppers
- Variations: See kinilaw
- Similar dishes: Sisig

Tokwa't baboy (Tagalog for "tofu and pork") is a typical Philippine appetizer. It consists of boiled pork ears and/or pork belly (traditionally favoring pork ears and other cast-off parts) and deep-fried tofu, and is served in a mixture of soy sauce, pork broth, vinegar, chopped white onions, scallions and sometimes red or green chili peppers. It is usually served as pulutan ("snack", lit. tran: "finger food"), as a meal served with rice or as a side dish to rice porridge. Tokwa is the Lan-nang word for firm beancurd, while baboy is the Tagalog word for pork; 't is the contracted form of at, which means "and".

Akin to sisig, the dish traditionally uses chopped-up pork ears and sometimes the face and snout as it was a way to help use up the less prestigious cuts, but in modern times pork belly or other standard cuts may be used alongside or instead of the ears. The original dish (without the tofu) is known as kulao or kilawin na tainga ng baboy among the Caviteño Tagalogs. It is a type of kinilaw. For this reason, tokwa't baboy is sometimes referred to as kilawing tokwa't baboy.

== See also ==
- List of hors d'oeuvre
- List of pork dishes
- List of tofu dishes
- Philippine Cuisine
