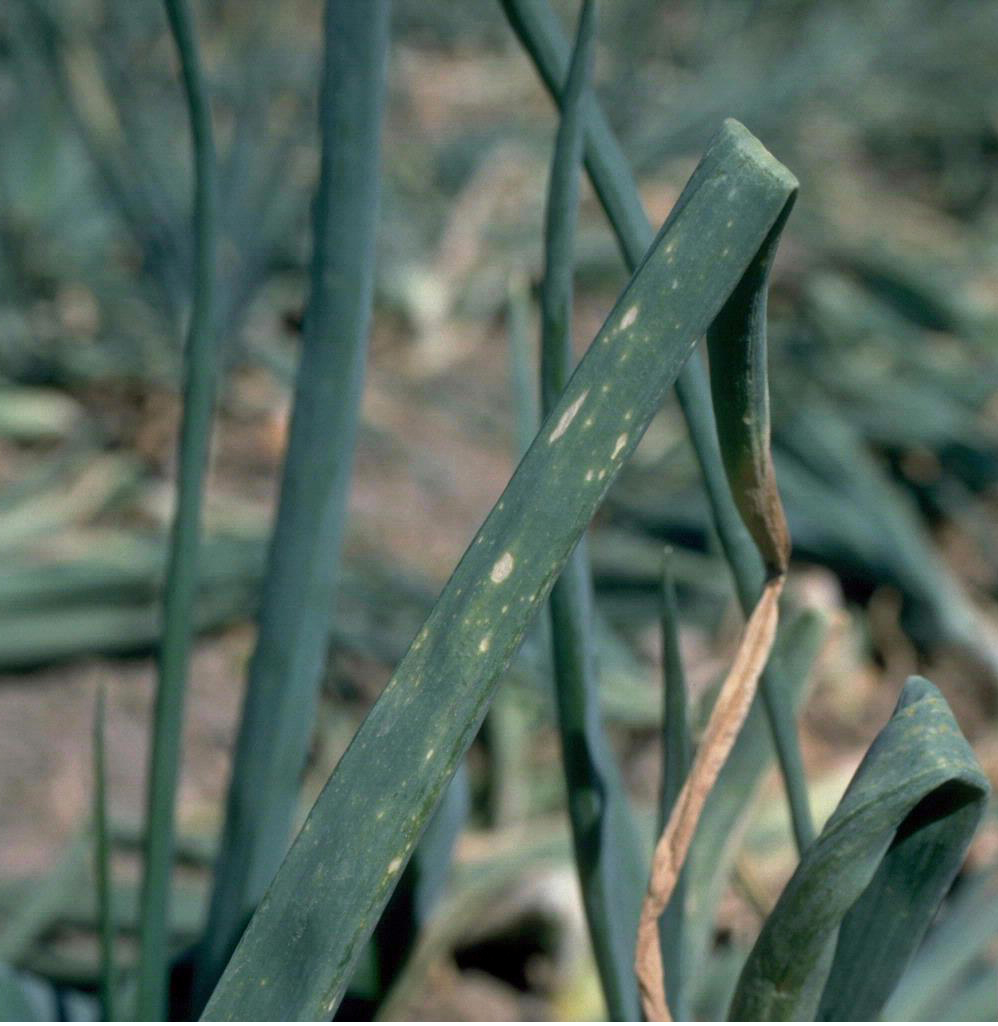

Scientific classification
- Kingdom: Fungi
- Division: Ascomycota
- Class: Leotiomycetes
- Order: Helotiales
- Family: Sclerotiniaceae
- Genus: Botrytis
- Species: B. allii

Binomial name
- Botrytis allii Munn (1917)

Synonyms
- Botrytis aclada Fresen. (1850)

= Botrytis allii =

Species of fungus

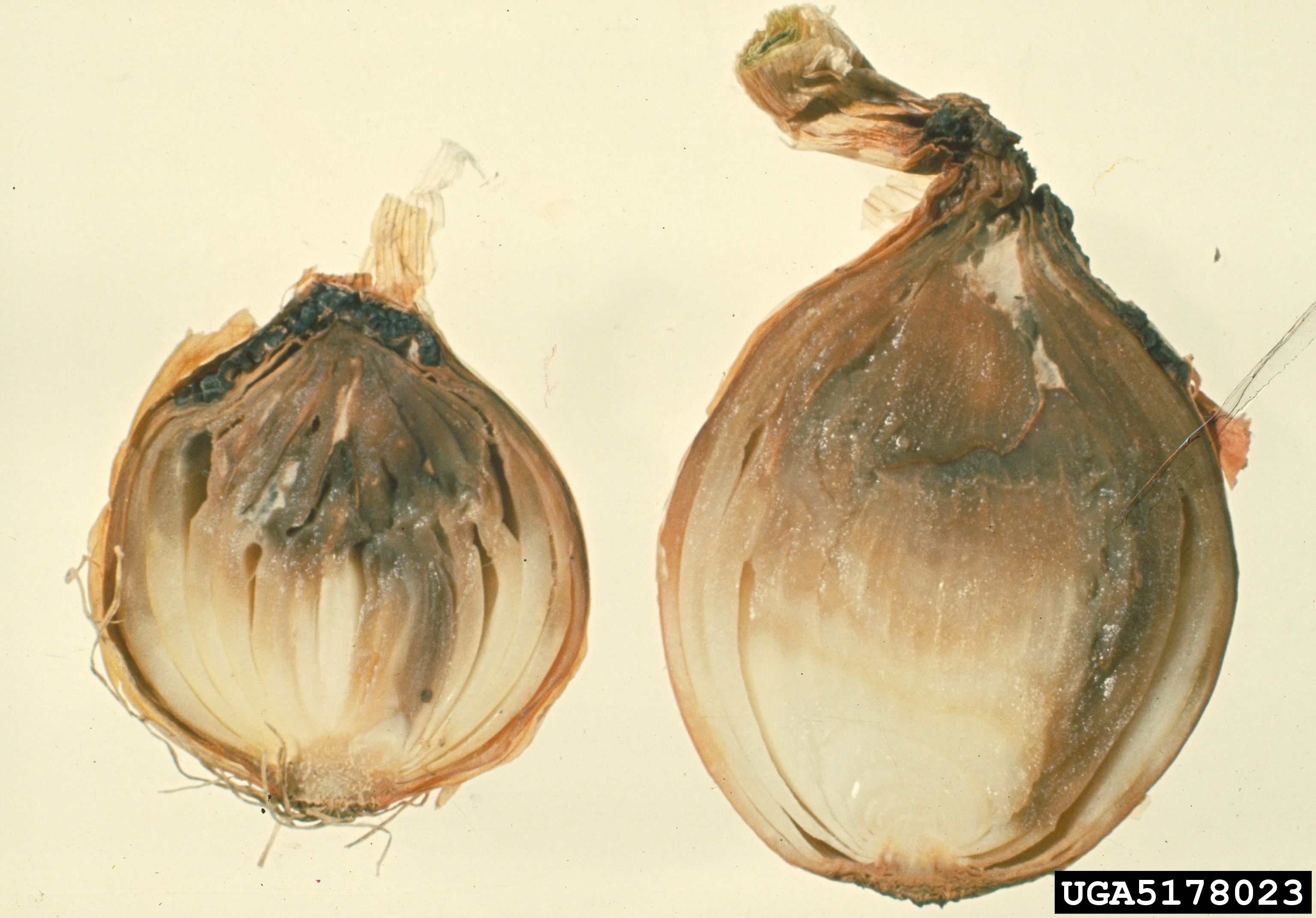
Advanced infection and colonization of onion bulb tissue by the Botrytis fungus, note brown to gray discoloration of onion tissue, and formation of black sclerotial bodies between onion scale

Botrytis allii is a plant pathogen, a fungus that causes neck rot in stored onions (Allium cepa) and related crops. Its teleomorph is unknown, but other species of Botrytis are anamorphs of Botryotinia species. The species was first described scientifically by Mancel Thornton Munn in 1917.

== Biology ==
There are seven different species of Botrytis associated with onions in storage, but the rot induced by B. allii and B. aclada causes the greatest commercial loss. The two can be distinguished microscopically; the conidia of B. allii have a maximum length of 15 μm and mean size of 10.2 × 5.7 μm, while the conidia of B. aclada have a maximum length of 12 μm and mean size of 8.6 × 4.6 μm. The infection is present in the field but does not manifest itself until after harvest, however there may be a falling off of vigour while the crop is still growing, particularly in cool, moist weather. In the stored crop, the rot typically starts in the neck of the bulb but can occur in other parts if there is physical injury. The scales inside the bulb become progressively translucent and watery and a mycelium develops between them. A mass of grey conidiophores and conidia develop on the mycelium, and blackish sclerotia form at the site of the initial infection.

In onion crops grown for the production of seed, Botrytis allii can cause spotting and girdling of the stipe (stem) and develop on the sheath that protects the inflorescence and on the flowers themselves. Concentric grey rings may form as the fungus sporulates and the crop may lodge (become flattened).

It has been shown that a major source of the pathogen is infected seed. In 1973, 71% of commercially available seed was found to be contaminated, and the infection was found to persist for over three years in seeds being stored. In the seedling, infection with B. allii does not produce any symptoms, but the fungus spreads between plants as the conidiophores release spores into the air. The leaf tips are invaded first, the infection spreading down the leaves and into the neck of the bulb, where its presence only becoming apparent when the foliage dies down at the end of the season.

== Hosts ==
Botrytis allii grows on Allium species, including onion (A. cepa), aggregating onion (A. cepa var. aggregatum), shallot (A. cepa var. ascalonicum), garlic (A. sativum) and leek (A. porrum). It may also infect wild Allium species and can grow saprophytically on decaying crop residues such as cereal, pea and bean straw. It is capable of colonizing and producing spores on sterilized poppy straw (Papaver somniferum).

== Commercial importance ==
Neck rot caused by Botrytis allii occurs in regions all over the world, but, it is most prevalent in temperate regions due to their conducive climates. Botrytis allii used to cause significant losses in the onion bulb industry in the UK. Fortunately, by utilization of better harvesting and curing methods, the disease prevalence has decreased. It is important that the US utilize these methods as well because the onion is a highly produced agronomic crop. In 2005, the US grew 65,000 hectares of onions with a farm gate value of $922 million. Botrytis allii poses a threat to that value because it can potentially cause a 50% reduction in yield if left unchecked. These losses caused by the disease may be even greater than reported. Detection of this disease is difficult due to the morphologically indistinguishable characteristics of Botrytis species cultured on agar. Higher quality detection methods of Botrytis allii are starting to be implemented to better differentiate it from other closely related Botrytis species. Within the last 15 years, scientists have been able to get a more accurate picture of Botrytis allii distribution through the use of PCR-RFLP detection methods.

== Management ==
Botrytis allii’s main agronomic host is the onion (Allium cepa). In order to control this disease, most agriculturalists utilize the fungicide benomyl. Benomyl is applied directly to the seed, as a pretreatment, before planting. However, the pretreatment must be used in addition to correct farming practices to further minimize the spread of Botrytis allii spores. For instance, benomyl works best if you dry the onions in a 30 °C (86 °F) environment after harvest. Lower drying temperatures, such as 18 °C (64 °F), during the post harvest period have been known to increase disease presence. In addition, removal of the onions from the field in the first 48 hours after mechanical removal of the top has also shown to lower post harvest disease. Moreover, it is important to pay attention to your fertilization schedule. High levels of nitrogen fertilizer during the growing season may cause delayed maturity. This is an issue because the onions that have the best chance of avoiding disease are the ones that have reached full maturity by the time they are harvested. Crop rotations can also help control disease outbreak. The rotation should take place over at least two years and crops not related to onions should be planted. Onion fields should be separated from each other because the spores of Botrytis allii are able to travel far distances.

== Pathogenesis ==
Botrytis allii is able to use polysaccharide-degrading enzymes to enter their onion host. These enzymes are able to degrade onion cell wall components such as sodium polypectate, citrus pectin, lupin galactan, araban, xylan and carboxymethyl cellulose. The most active enzyme that Botrytis allii uses is polygalacturonase, which is used to degrade sodium polypectate. When the fungus attempts to penetrate the epidermal cells of the onion, there is an observed accumulation of granular deposits, called reaction material, that are found between the cell wall and plasma membrane. The reaction material correlates with reduced fungal growth between the cell walls where it is found. During infection, the onion will also produce hydroxycinnamic acid amide, which is a common plant defense response. There may also be some cytoskeletal rearrangements within the onion so that it can provide a better route to deliver the phenolic products to the fungal penetration site.
