= Sisig =

Filipino dish that consists of pork scraps

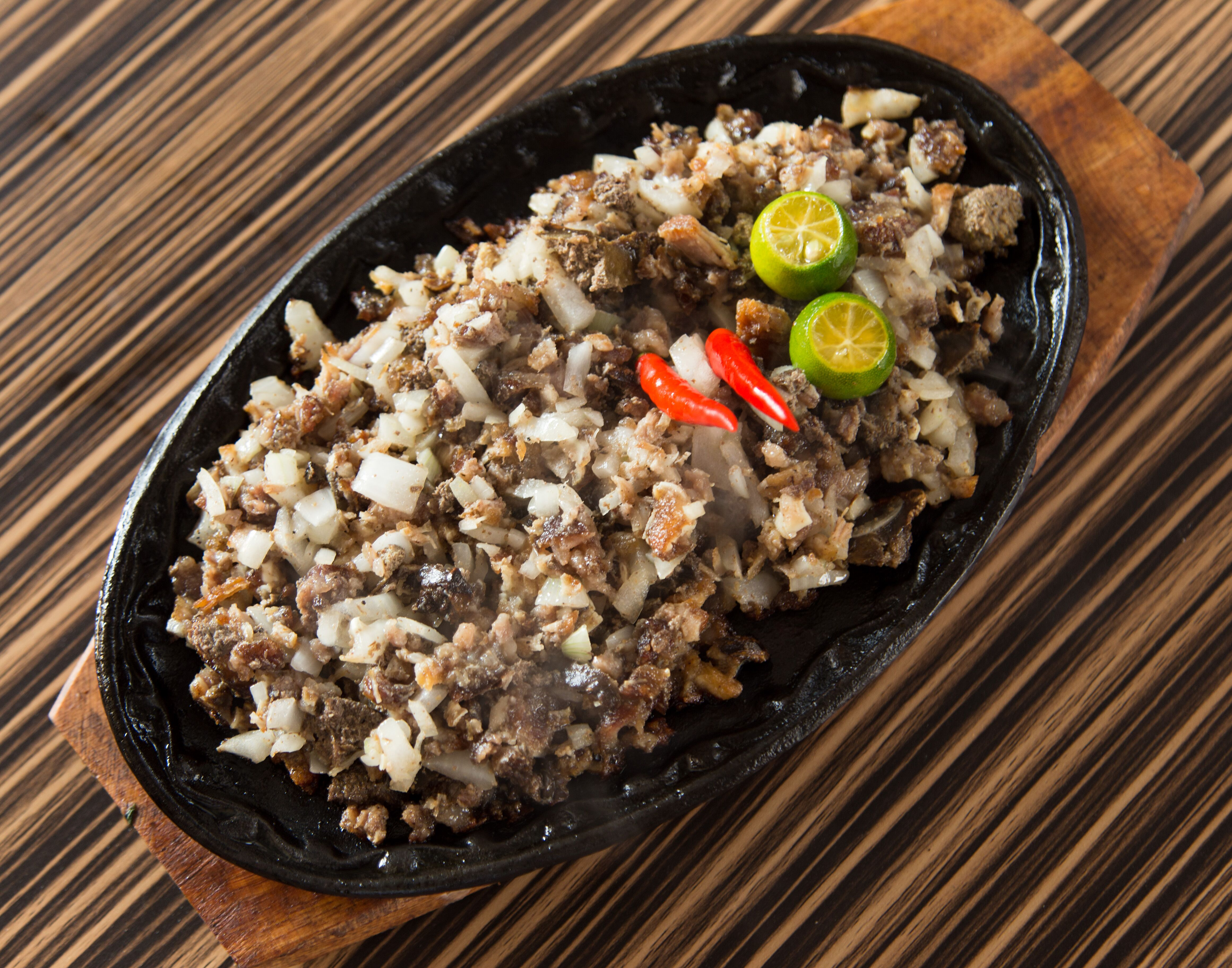
- Kapampangan sisig served on a hot plate.
- Alternative names: Sisig
- Course: Main course, snack, salad
- Place of origin: Philippines
- Region or state: Pampanga region
- Created by: Modern sisig – Lucia Cunanan; original sisig – no attributed creator
- Serving temperature: Hot
- Main ingredients: Pork jowls, ears, sometimes brain and liver, onions and chili
- Variations: Chicken sisig, beef sisig, squid sisig, tuna or bangus sisig or other fish, tofu sisig
- Food energy (per serving): 293 kcal (1,230 kJ)
- Similar dishes: Dinakdakan, Kilawin, Tokwa't baboy
- Other information: Sisig Day, January 3

Sisig (/ˈsiːsɪɡ/ Tagalog pronunciation: ['sisig]) is a Filipino dish made from pork jowl and ears (maskara), which is usually seasoned with calamansi, onions, and chili peppers. It originates from the Pampanga region in Luzon.

Sisig is a staple of Kapampangan cuisine. The city government of Angeles, Pampanga, through City Ordinance No. 405, series of 2017, declared sizzling sisig babi ("pork sisig") a tangible heritage of the city.

== Origin ==
The earliest known record of the word sisig can be traced back to 1732, and was recorded by Augustinian friar Diego Bergaño in his Vocabulary of the Kapampangan Language in Spanish and Dictionary of the Spanish Language in Kapampangan. Bergaño defines sisig as a "salad, including green papaya, or green guava eaten with a dressing of salt, pepper, garlic, and vinegar." The term manisig as in manisig manga, a phrase still used today, refers to eating green mangoes dipped in vinegar.

The term also came to be used to a method of preparing fish and meat, especially pork, which is marinated in a sour liquid such as lemon juice or vinegar, then seasoned with salt, pepper, and other spices.

=== Sisig queen ===
Lucia Cunanan of Angeles, also known as "Aling Lucing", has been credited with reinventing the modern version of sisig. Cunanan's trademark sisig was developed in mid-1974 when she served a concoction of grilled and chopped pig ears and cheeks seasoned with vinegar, calamansi juice, chopped onions and chicken liver and served in hot plates. Today, varieties include sisig ala pizzailo, pork combination, green mussels or tahong, mixed seafood, ostrich sisig, crocodile sisig, spicy python, frog sisig, and tokwa't baboy, among others.

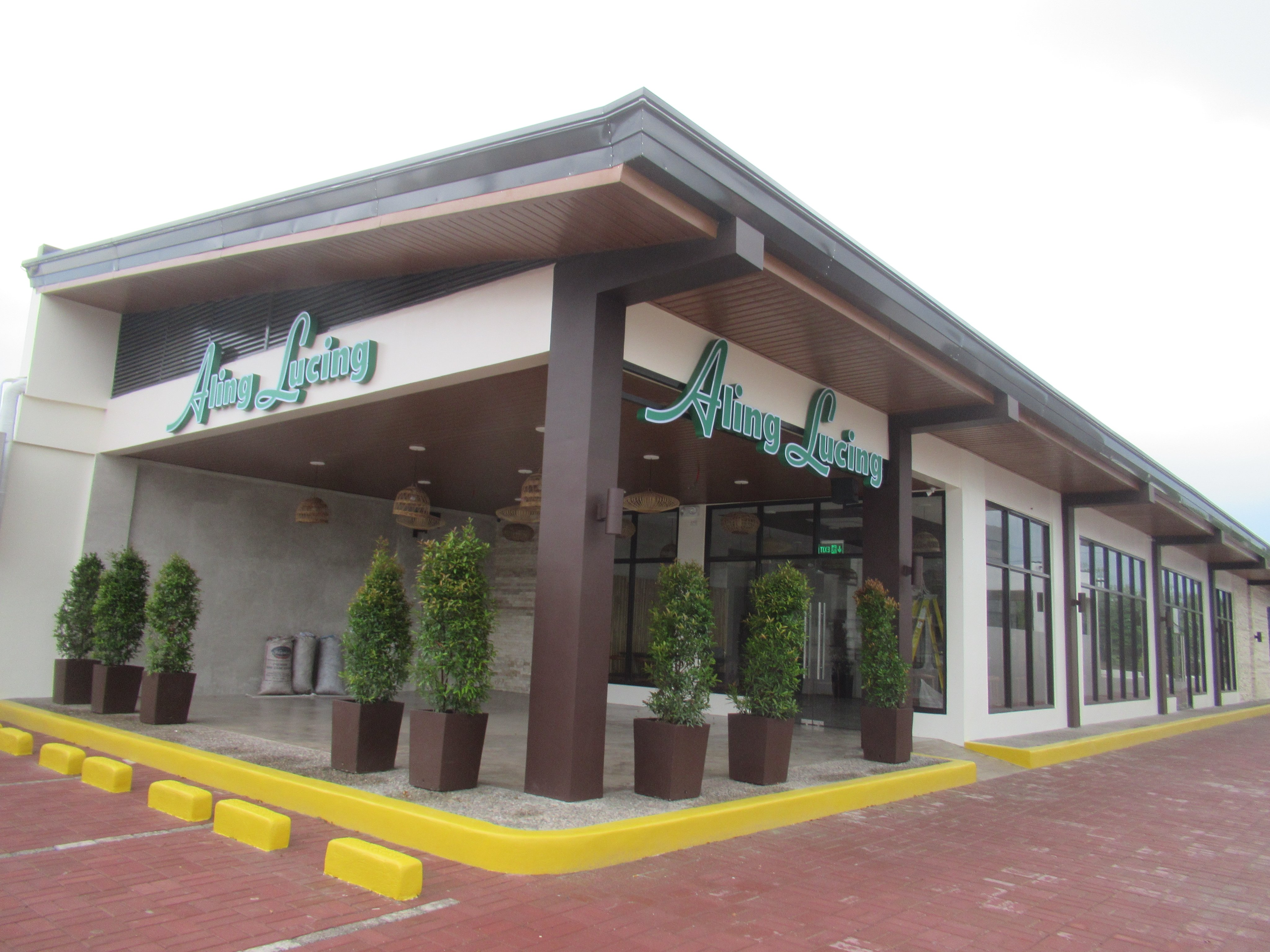
An Aling Lucing Sisig restaurant branch in Magalang, Pampanga

The Philippine Department of Tourism has acknowledged that her "Aling Lucing's" restaurant had established Angeles as the "Sisig Capital of the Philippines" in 1974.

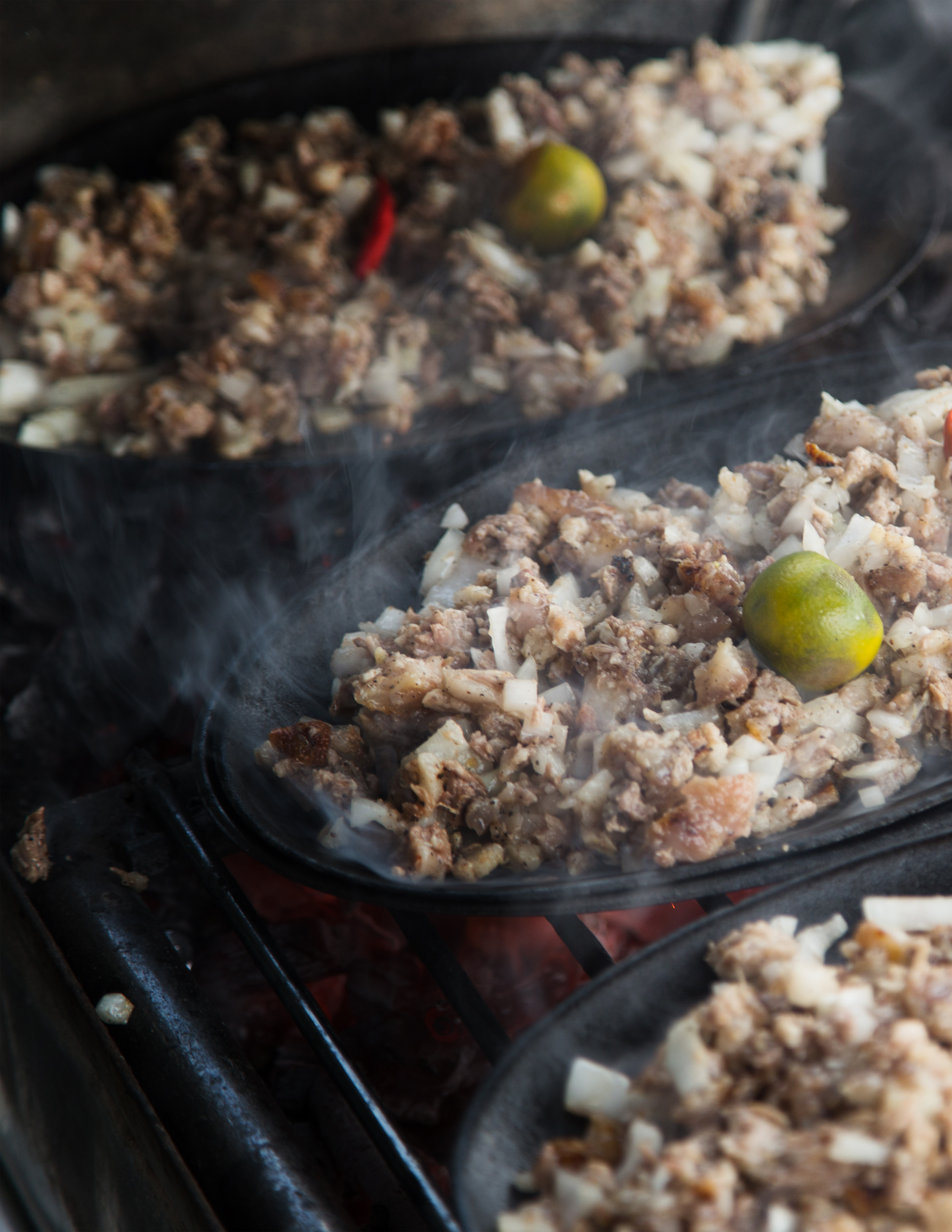
Sizzling sisig served on grill platters

The use of the pig's head in the modern versions of the dish is commonly attributed to the readily-accessible supply of cheap excess meat from the commissaries of Clark Air Base in Angeles City, when the military bases agreement between the Philippines and the United States were still in effect (1947 to 1991). Pig heads were purchased cheap (or free), since they were not used in preparing meals for the U.S. Air Force personnel stationed there.

== Preparation ==
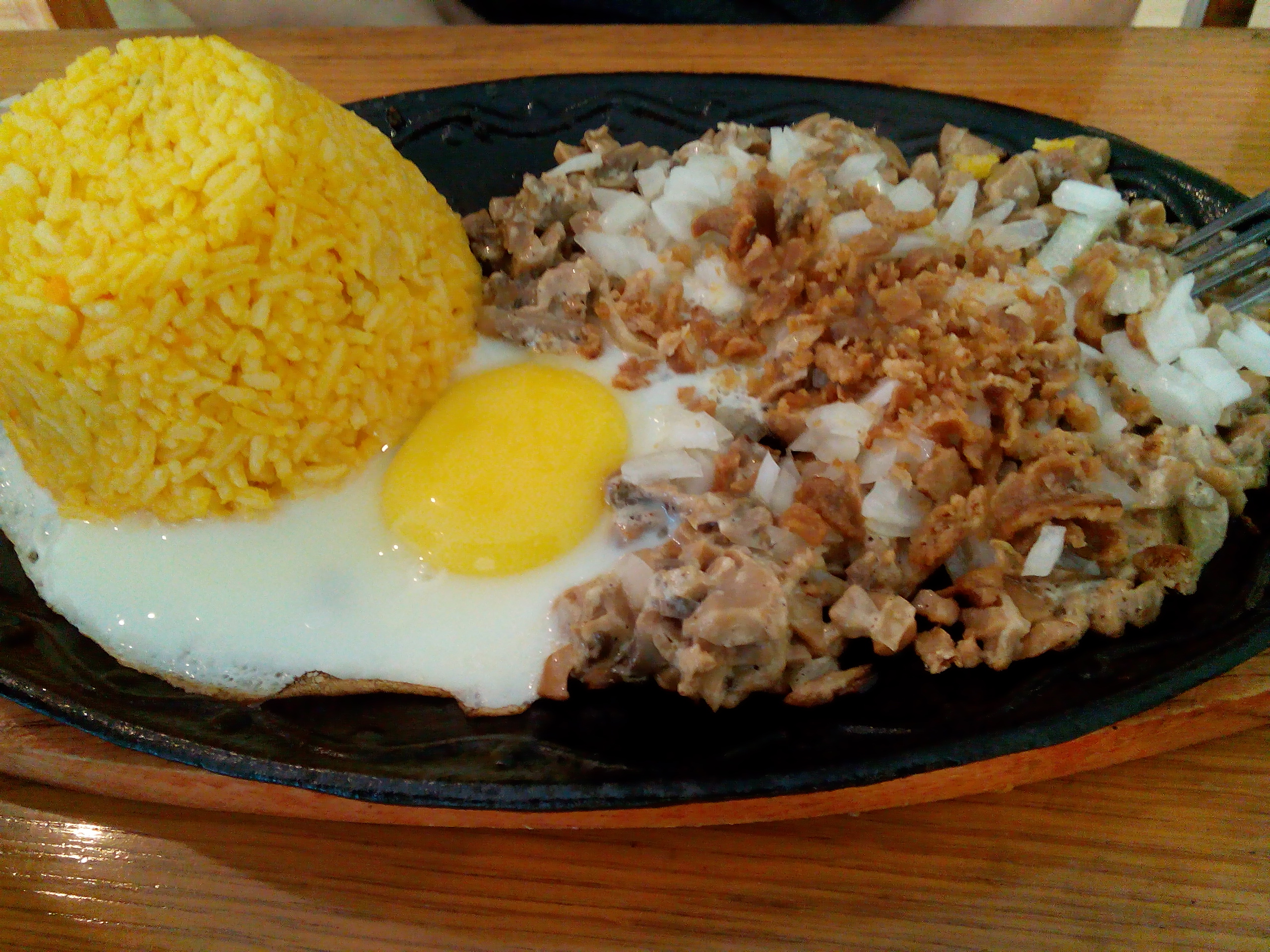
A sisig variation in Malolos uses mushroom as the main ingredient, served with fried rice and egg.

According to Cunanan's recipe, preparing sisig comes in three phases: boiling, broiling, and finally grilling. A pig's head is first boiled to remove hairs and to tenderize it. Portions of it are then chopped and grilled or broiled. Finally, coarsely chopped onions are added and served on a sizzling plate.

A plate of chunky sisig

Variations of sisig may use pork belly as a more standard and prestigious cut of meat and include pork or chicken liver and/or any of: eggs, ox brains, chicharon (pork cracklings), and mayonnaise; although these additions are common nowadays, they are frowned upon by the traditionalist chefs of Pampanga as it deviates far from the identity of the original sisig. Recently, local chefs have experimented with ingredients other than pork such as chicken, squid, tuna, and tofu.

Sisig has also been adapted into different dishes, making it into salad, taco fillings, chicken stuffing, carbonara meat, and others.

== Festival ==
The annual "Sisig Festival" (Sadsaran Qng Angeles) is held every year during December in Angeles, Pampanga, celebrating the Kapampangan dish. It started in 2003 and was made an annual festival by Mayor Carmelo Lazatin in December 2004 to promote the city's culinary prowess. The festival also features a contest where chefs compete in making dishes, primarily sisig. Congo Grille, a restaurant chain in the country, was the winner in 2006.

In 2008, the festival was put on hiatus following Aling Lucing's death. In 2014, Ayala Malls's Marquee Mall incorporated the festival by including it within their annual Big Bite! Northern Food Festival, held every October or November.

The Angeles City Tourism Office organized a festival on April 29, 2017. The revival of the festival was in line with the Philippine Department of Tourism's Flavors of the Philippines campaign. Now called "Sisig Fiesta", the festivities were held at Valdes Street, Angeles (also known as "Crossing" since it was a former railroad track), where Aling Lucing reinvented the dish. The newly revived Sisig Fiesta was a one-day event that featured a line up of sisig sampler banquet, sisig and BBQ stalls, cooking demonstrations with celebrity chefs, and a showcase of Angeleño culinary talent through competitions.

== See also ==
- Dinakdakan – a similar dish from the Ilocos Region of the Philippines
- Livermush – a Southern United States pork food product prepared using pig liver, parts of pig heads, cornmeal and spices
