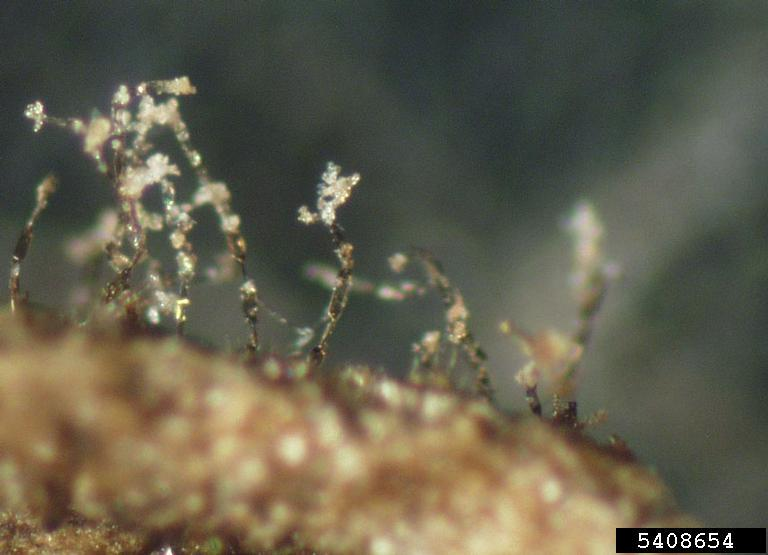
- Asexual spore of the fungus

Scientific classification
- Kingdom: Fungi
- Division: Ascomycota
- Class: Leotiomycetes
- Order: Helotiales
- Family: Sclerotiniaceae
- Genus: Botrytis
- Species: B. elliptica

Binomial name
- Botrytis elliptica (Berk.) Cooke, 1901

Synonyms
- Ovularia elliptica Berk., 1881; Peronospora elliptica (Berk.) W. G. Sm., 1888

= Botrytis elliptica =

Species of fungus

Botrytis elliptica is a necrotrophic fungal pathogen which infects species of plants in the Lilium genus, causing the disease commonly known as Lily Gray Mold. The symptoms of Lily Gray Mold include the appearance of water-soaked spots on leaves which appear white and increase in darkness with age, ranging from gray to brown. These spots may cover the entire leaf, complemented with a gray webbing, containing the fungal spores. The leaves will appear wilted and branches may die back. In addition to leaves, petals, stems, and buds may be infected, and this gray webbing will eventually cover the plant, feigning the appearance of gray flowers. Infected buds often rot. Lily Gray Mold disease, if not properly treated, will appear each year with increasing vigor.

== Disease cycle ==
The disease cycle for Botrytis elliptica begins with infection of plants in spring. This may be derived from mycelium in overwintering sclerotia, which produce conidiophores to create conidia, the asexual spores of this fungus. The conidia germinate, often penetrating the young leaf tissue of the lily, although the flowers, buds, or stem may also suffer from infection. This infects cells, which collapse, disintegrate, and rot the tissue. This cycle is polycyclic. The conidiophores spread, producing more conidia to further infect new areas of the plant or spread to new plants. Additionally, B. elliptica reproduces sexually via a heterothallic mating system with two alleles: MAT1-1 and MAT1-2. All ascomycetes studied of B. elliptica contain these genes, which are orthologous to the alpha-domain protein (MAT1-1) and the HMG-domain protein (MAT1-2). These proteins act together as a master regulator the initiation of sexual fruiting body development, which begins when both proteins are expressed in a dikaryotic cell. Apothecia result from this union. These are brown in color, and darken as they mature, and they range between 7–12 mm in height, with apothecial disks from 3–4 mm diameter and 0.5-1.0 mm in thickness. The ascospores produced from the apothecia are 23 x 10 μm. These ascospores infect Lilium species’ leaves as effectively as the conidia throughout the growing season, although mycelium are the primary inoculants of young lily shoots in the spring. These ascospores may overwinter in the dead leaf debris and infect new foliage in the spring.

== Management ==
As Lilium species are of great horticultural interest in ornamental production, B. elliptica must be prevented and managed to continue production. Plant breeders currently work to determine Botrytis-resistant cultivars of Lilium. The rapid accumulation of hydrogen peroxide, nitrous oxide, and antioxidant activity trigger in the plant's defense response, and long-term, highly concentrated increases contribute to high resistance in these plants. Cultivars displaying high resistance are the Oriental and Oriental x Trumpet hybrid lines, whereas the susceptible cultivars included Asiatic and Trumpet cultivars. Defense responses found in Lilium species are mediated by phytohormones involved in jasmonate signaling, increasing the transcription for defense-related proteins. These proteins include receptor kinases, antioxidant enzymes, polyphenol oxidase, pathogenesis-related proteins, and proteins involved in the phenylpropanoid metabolism. Highly resistant Lilium species cultivars express genes producing these proteins more effectively than in the susceptible cultivars.

In addition to breeding for Botrytis-resistant cultivars, steps can be taken to prevent the spread of this mold in the field. Because this mold requires water to spread to other plants, Botrytis can be greatly reduced with good drainage to the soil and caution to avoid overwatering. Additionally, sanitation of plants is extremely important, such as deadheading dying flowers and removing infected leaves. The ascospores on this debris could overwinter and infect the plants in the spring, so it is advised to either bury the debris in a hole at least 12” deep or, preferably, burn it. Fungicides are rarely needed and are typically used as a prevention method early in the season. Thiophanate-methyl, copper fungicides or, as a weak fungicide, neem oil, can be effectively used in home gardens, although with caution, particularly with new cultivars of Lilium species. These treatments should be applied to selected plants before treating an entire bed, and always using the recommended instructions on the product's label.
