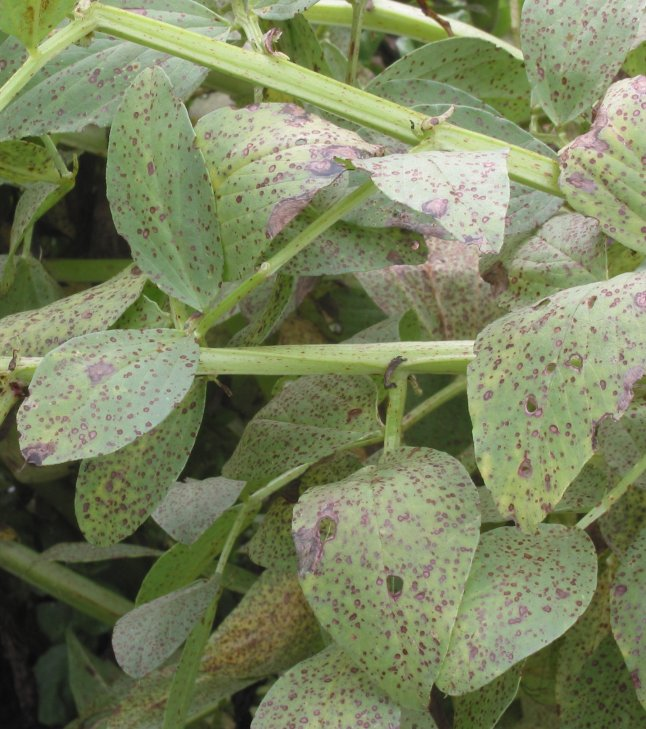

Scientific classification
- Kingdom: Fungi
- Division: Ascomycota
- Class: Leotiomycetes
- Order: Helotiales
- Family: Sclerotiniaceae
- Genus: Botryotinia; Whetzel

Type species
- Botryotinia convoluta (Drayton) Whetzel

= Botryotinia =

Genus of fungi

Botryotinia is a genus of ascomycete fungi causing several plant diseases. The anamorphs of Botryotinia are mostly included in the "imperfect fungi" genus Botrytis. The genus contains 22 species and one hybrid.

Plant diseases caused by Botryotinia species appear primarily as blossom blights and fruit rots but also as leaf spots and bulb rots in the field and in stored products. The fungi induce host cell death resulting in progressive decay of infected plant tissue, whence they take nutrients. Sexual reproduction takes place with ascospores produced in apothecia, conidia are the means of asexual reproduction. Sclerotia of plano-convexoid shape are typical. Some species also cause damping off, killing seeds or seedlings during or before germination.

Botryotinia fuckeliana (or its anamorph Botrytis cinerea) is an important species for wine industry as well as horticulture. Other economically important species include Botryotinia convoluta (the type species of the genus), Botryotinia polyblastis, Botrytis allii and Botrytis fabae. Botrytis tulipae is a serious pest of tulip crops and Botrytis narcissicola the bulbs of Narcissus.

== Taxonomy ==
For a complete list of species, see Beever and Weeds, Table 1.

Selected species (anamorph, teleomorph) include;

- Botrytis allii Munn
- Botrytis cinerea Pers.:Fr.— Botryotinia fuckeliana (de Bary) Whetzel
- Botryotinia convoluta (Drayton) Whetzel
- Botrytis fabae Sardiña
- Botrytis narcissicola Kleb. ex Westerd. & JFH Beyma syn. Sclerotinia narcissicola
- Botryotinia polyblastis Dowson syn. Sclerotinia polyblastis
- Botrytis tulipae Lind

== Bibliography ==
- WR Jarvis.Botryotinia and Botrytis species : taxonomy, physiology and pathogenicity : a guide to the literature (1977)
- Elad, Yigal; Williamson, Brian; Tudzynski, Paul; Delen, Nafiz, eds. (2007). Botrytis biology, pathology and control. Dordrecht, Netherlands: Springer. doi:10.1007/978-1-4020-2626-3. ISBN 978-1-4020-2626-3.
