= Congo Grille =

Philippine restaurant chain

- Type: Public
- Industry: Restaurants
- Founded: Quezon City, Philippines (1999; 27 years ago)
- Founder: Kenneth Sytin
- Headquarters: Pasig, Philippines
- Number of locations: 10
- Products: Philippine cuisine Grilled food
- Website: www.congogrille.com (defunct)

Congo Grille is a chain of family restaurants in the Philippines named for its African jungle-themed interiors. In contrast to the decor, the cuisine is predominantly Filipino with a smidgen of Western and Chinese foods. The restaurant is also popularly known as The Sisig King for its recent achievements in a food feast celebrating the favorite Filipino dish. The chain has plans to build stores overseas, especially in the United States.

== History ==
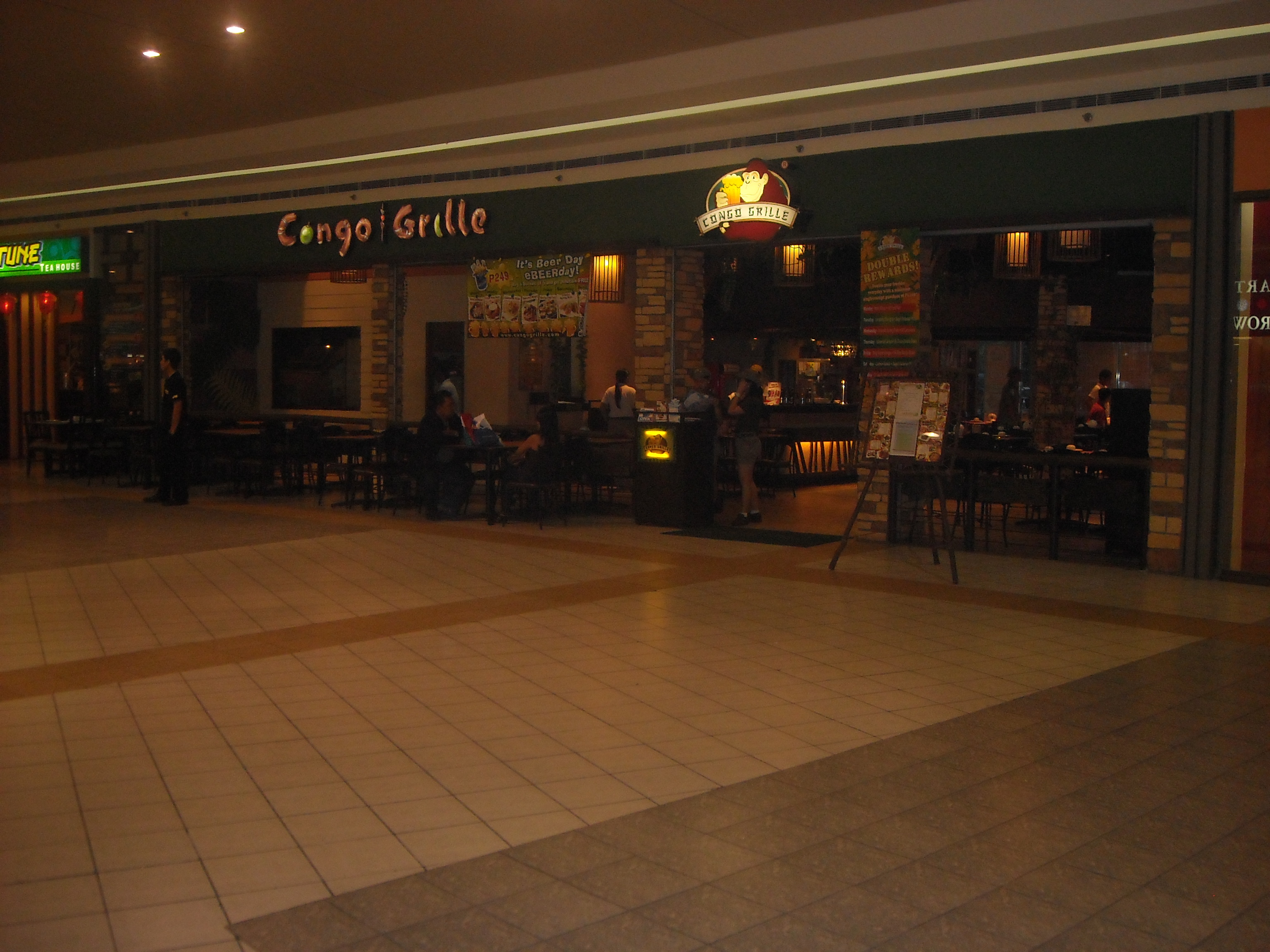
Congo Grille at SM City Clark, Angeles, Pampanga

Congo Grille was established in 1999 by Kenneth Sytin and his brothers. That year, the business had as many as 13,000 customers a month and was dubbed "the fastest growing grill in town." In 2006, Congo Grille participated in the Annual Sisig Festival held in Angeles City. Their pork sisig and two other sisig dishes won first prizes in the major categories.

The restaurant operates based on three concepts; a Philippine restaurant in an air conditioned environment, food without monosodium glutamate, and a mascot (an ape in a safari outfit) for entertaining youngsters. Congo Grille was opened for franchising in 2008.

The first franchised-operated store opened at the Araneta Center in 2009.

== Charities ==
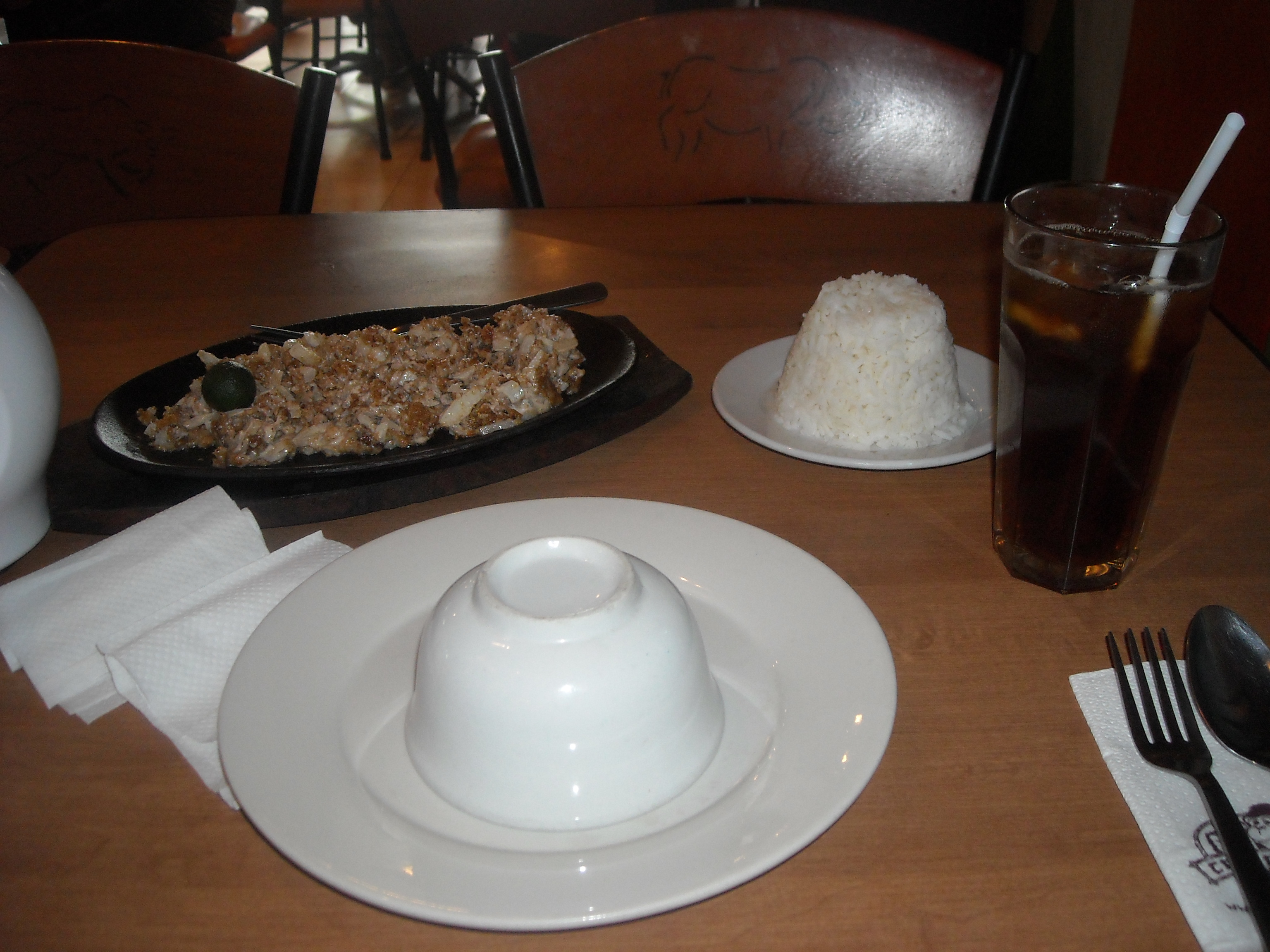
A common meal of sisig, rice and iced tea

In 2007, Congo Grille, along with other companies, organized a party to feed 407 children of low-income families in the city of Valenzuela. This was part of a program dealing with nationwide hunger.

Two years later, they teamed up with local television network GMA in feeding low-income individuals. Workers of the restaurant chain offered meals to 300 people in Quezon City, its birthplace. Toys and other collectibles were also donated.
