= Lucia Cunanan =

Filipino restaurateur

Lucía Cunanan
- Born: Lucía Lagman; December 13, 1927; La Paz, Tarlac, Insular Government of the Philippine Islands, United States
- Died: April 16, 2008 (aged 80); Angeles City, Pampanga Philippines
- Cause of death: Stabbing
- Other names: Aling Lucing; Lucing; Lucy
- Occupations: Restaurateur; entrepreneur
- Known for: Inventing sisig
- Spouse: Victorino F. Cunanan

Lucía "Aling Lucing" Lagman Cunanan (February 27, 1928 – April 16, 2008) was a Filipino restaurateur best known for having invented, or re-invented, sisig, a popular Kapampangan dish in the Philippines and Filipino diasporas worldwide.

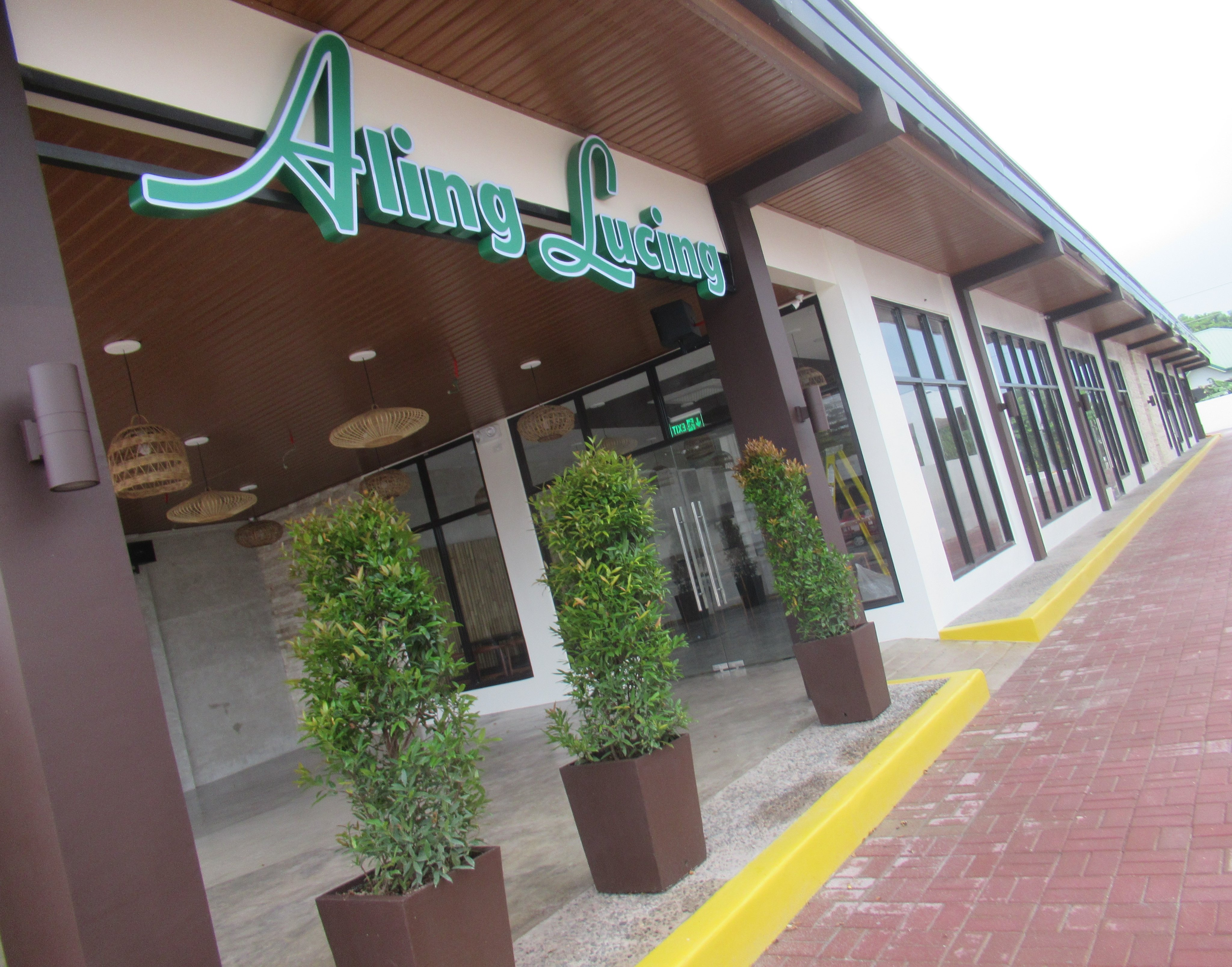
Aling Lucing Fred's Cafe Magalang

== Career ==
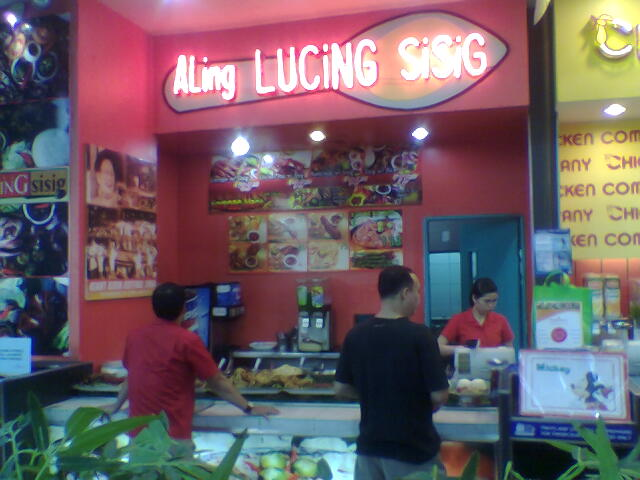
A typical Aling Lucing outlet

Lucia Cunanan was born in Tarlac on February 27, 1928. She settled in Pampanga after her marriage to Victorino F. Cunanan.

In 1974, she established Aling Lucing's, a restaurant in Angeles City. Her restaurant offered a reinvented variant of sisig which soon became nationally famous. The popularity of Cunanan's sisig had helped establish Angeles City as the "Sisig Capital of the Philippines", thus her earning the sobriquet "Sisig Queen".

== Death ==
Cunanan was found bludgeoned to death in her Angeles City home with 10 stab wounds on April 16, 2008, aged 80. Two days after her murder, local police filed homicide charges against her then 85-year-old husband Victorino. He was believed to have killed Lucia after she refused to give him money for his mistress’ needs.
