= White onion =

Onion cultivar

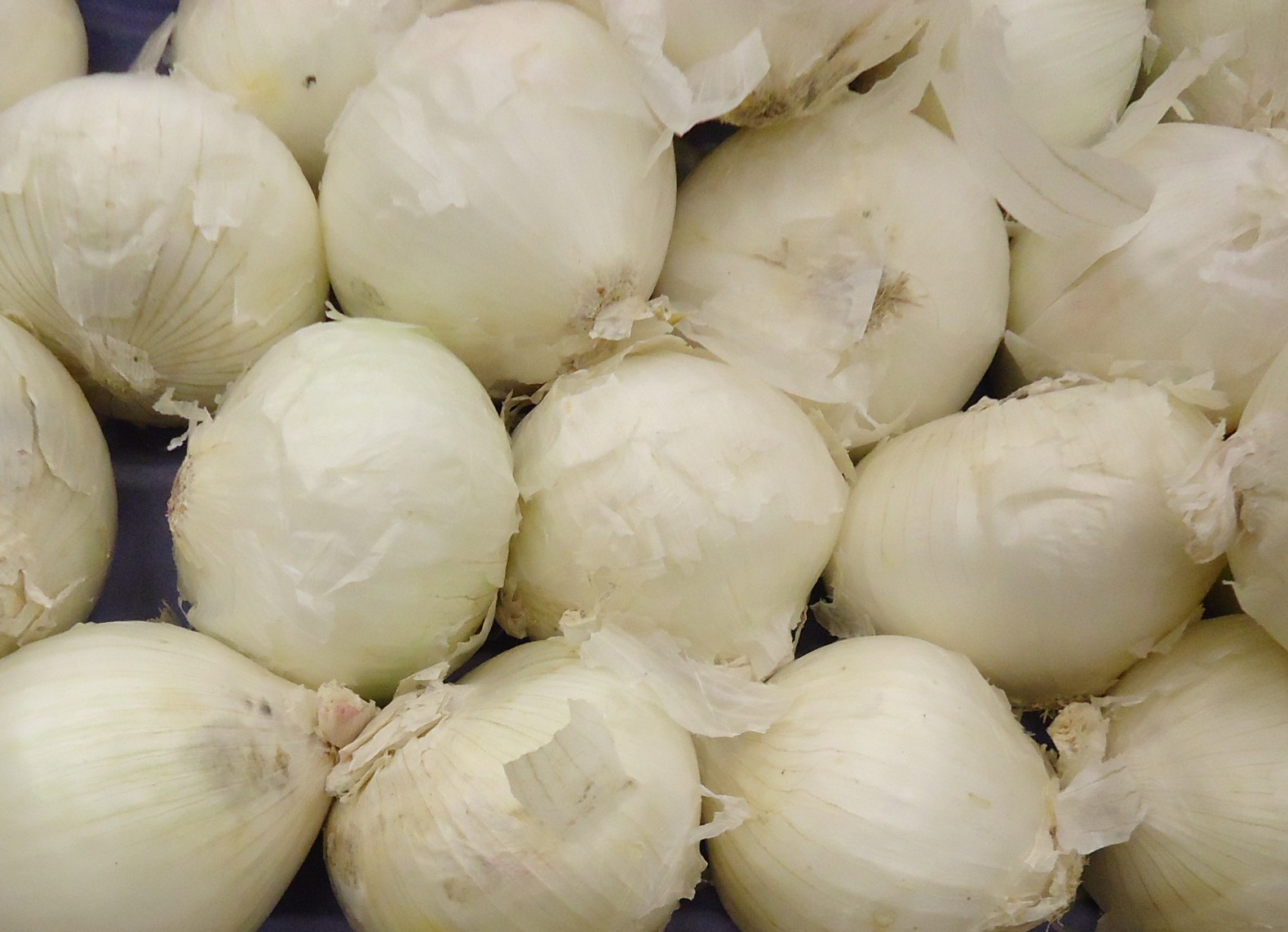
- White onions
- Genus: Allium
- Species: Allium cepa

White onions are a cultivar of dry onion which have a distinct light and mild flavour profile. Much like red onions, they have a high sugar and low sulphur content, and thus have a relatively short shelf life. White onions are used in a variety of dishes, such as those of Mexican and European origin. Their uses in dishes often relate to their mild nature, they are often included in dishes to provide a light, fresh and sour taste to dishes and are often added uncooked to dishes such as salads.

== Flavour profile and culinary uses ==
White onions have a distinctively mild flavour palette in comparison to other onion cultivars such as the red and yellow onions. They are distinctly less pungent and have a lighter flavour on account of their relatively high sugar and low sulphur content than other onion types. Because of this mild and easily palatable flavour, white onions are often used raw in dishes such as sandwiches and salads. When raw white onion is soaked after being finely chopped, it adopts a relatively sweet flavour profile as it loses its astringency.

Due to this flavour profile, white onion is versatile in its uses for food. Its use is often central to the construction of salads as it provides a fresh, but not overwhelmingly pungent flavour sensation. It is also widely used as a central ingredient in the making of stews as its light flavour does not overpower the other elements of the dish, contributing to a cohesive flavour palette. White onion is also extremely useful as a component in fermented dishes such as coleslaw as its low astringency allows it to adopt a largely sweet flavour in the dish. It also has many uses in dishes such as salsas because of this low astringency.

== Diseases affecting white onions ==
=== Onion Smudge ===
The parasitic ‘Onion Smudge’ ("Colletotrichum circinans (Berk.) Voglino") is a disease which affects crops of onion subspecies internationally, at all stages of development. Agricultural scientist, James Charles Walker notes that white onions are especially susceptible to infection of onion smudge due to the lack of pigment in its outer shells, as coloured onion subspecies contain a higher concentration of phenolic acid in its shells. Onion smudge thrives in damp soil conditions of above 20 degrees Celsius. The fungus can survive in the soil of onion plantations, and thus is extremely dangerous as it can impact the yield and performance of future crops.

Onion smudge causes damage to the outer scale leaves of the white onion, damaging the cosmetics of the bulb and ultimately reducing its market value. If the smudge is unnoticed in its early stages and the onion is left untreated with other onions. The parasite has the potential to infect the entire crop and cause the degeneration of the scale leaves, premature sprouting and the creation of conditions in which further storage rot may occur.

=== Onion White Rot ===
White Rot (Sclerotium cepivorum) (also known as Allium Root Rot) is a notorious and severe fungal disease which impacts most members of the allium family, including garlic, leeks and onion varieties. The fungus is unique in that it does not produce spores of great significance in its lifetime. Rather, it exists in the soil as a hardened fungal mass known as sclerotia, which remain detached and dormant in the soil until there are favourable conditions and it can attach itself to a host. Given the resilience of the fungi, it can remain in the soil for over 20 years, rendering many fields unviable for the planting and harvesting of onions.

White Rot can spread throughout a field, or from field to field by means of flood or rainwater, agricultural equipment or other organic materials, such as plant scales blown by the wind. White Rot may be identified initially by the onion's leaves, the oldest of which will show yellowing, wilting and leaf dieback, beginning from the base of the allium. A white fluffy growth (mycelium) may be found at the base of the bulb of the onion, which later becomes compacted and the place of formation for the sclerotia. The fungus thrives in low temperatures and is noticeably dormant during warm temperatures.

=== Botrytis Leaf Blight ===
Botrytis Leaf Blight (Botrytis squamosa) is a fungal disease which mainly affects plants in the allium family, particularly onions. The impacts of Botrytis Leaf Blight are mainly seen in the leaves of the plant. After infection, the fungus causes leaf spot (also known as leaf lesions), and the maceration of the foliage tissue of the plant, resulting in dieback and blighting. The lesions are initially often whitish and approximately 1–5mm long, with a light green halo that appears wet surrounding it. The lesion then usually becomes sunken and straw-like into the stages of fungal development and may develop a slit in the lesion. Severely affected plants may result in a significantly smaller bulb size and a blighted appearance.

The Botrytis Leaf Blight pathogen survives the winter much like White Rot does, as sclerotia (a small mass of fungi capable of thriving in hostile conditions). Such sclerotia is responsible for spreading the pathogen and infecting crops as it has been observed to infect leaves and bulbs of sprouted crops. Pathogens stored on the surface of the soil may produce asexual spores called conidia which may further infect crops. Botrytis Leaf Blight thrives in wet and cold temperatures but can still infect outside of these conditions.

=== Onion Downy Mildew ===
Onion Downy Mildew is a disease that is caused by the oomycete Peronospora destructor. It is a foliar disease, and causes leaf to become pale green, then tan, brown or yellow and finally collapse. The fungus is extremely infectious to white onion crops and can often be first observed by patterns of yellowing within a field of onion crops. Such patterns often correspond to the direction of the prevailing winds, enlarging as the disease progresses. On individual plants, signs of Peronospora Destructor can be visible, as fine, furry growths that have a greyish white colour. These growths are susceptible to further infection by diseases such as Purple Blotch of Onion or Stemphylium Leaf Blight of Onion, and if infected, can produce purple pigmentation of lesion and dark spores.

The Peronospora Destructor pathogen only produces spores in live hosts, and releases spores at night, when there are cold temperatures and easily be blown across crops and infect other plants. Overwintering spores of Onion Downy Mildew are known as oospores which can be found in volunteer onions, cull piles and in infected onion bulbs. The disease can be found worldwide, but favours humid climates as it requires moisture for infection of hosts. It is most prevalent in late Spring and throughout Summer.

== Planting of white onions ==
There are multiple methods of planting white onions:

- Onion Transplants: a method by which seedlings started in the current growing period are bought and planted in one's own garden. This method often yields quick bulb growth, but the plants are more vulnerable to disease in maturity.
- Onion Sets: small bulbs from the previous harvest are not allowed to mature and are dried. These bulbs are used in the current season, and often grow the quickest out of all planting methods and produce larger than natural bulbs.
- Onion Seeds: seeds of the white onion that can be planted into sets in late Spring. While this method may have the longest grow time (up to 4 months for mature bulbs), the onions produced are the least susceptible to disease.

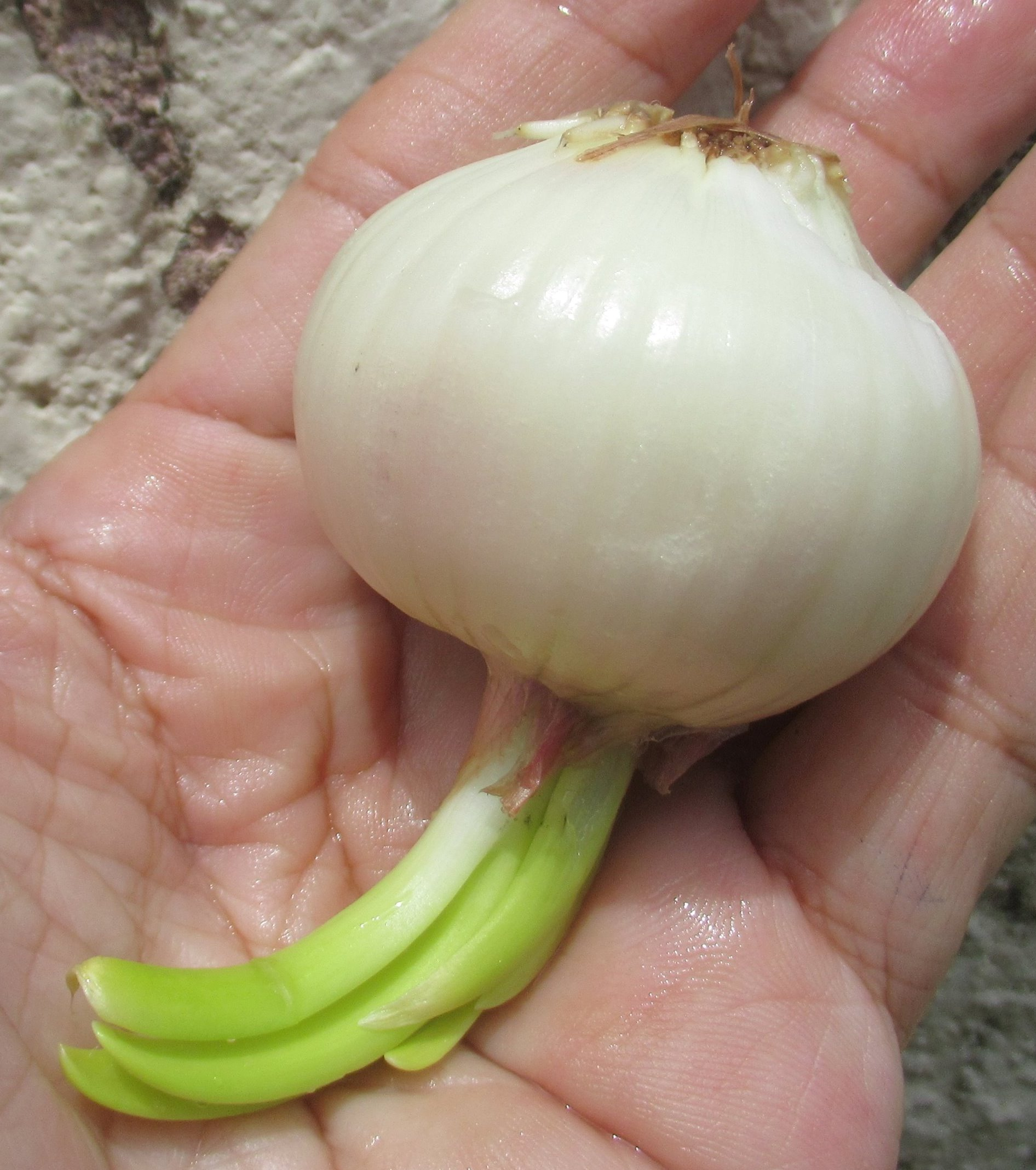
White onion seedling bulb soft and sprouting

Different varieties of onions vary in the time of year at which a mature white onion is cultivated:

- Short-day onions are onions that form bulbs when they are in an environment where they get 10 to 12 hours of sunlight a day.
- Intermediate day onions are onions that will form mature bulbs when they are in an environment where they get 12 to 14 hours of sunlight a day.
- Long-day onions are onions that form bulbs when they are in an environment where they get 14 to 16 hours of sunlight a day.

For most white onion varieties, a soil pH of 6–7 is optimal. At times when the pH of the soil for onions is below 5.5, magnesium and molybdenum supply is inadequate and at a pH of above 6.5, zinc, manganese and iron are less present in the soil.
