= Botrytis tracheiphila =

Scientific classification
- Domain: Eukaryota
- Kingdom: Fungi
- Division: Ascomycota
- Class: Leotiomycetes
- Order: Helotiales
- Family: Sclerotiniaceae
- Genus: Botrytis
- Species: B. tracheiphila

Binomial name
- Botrytis tracheiphila (Sacc. & D. Sacc.) Korf, (1986)

Synonyms
- Phialophora tracheiphila

Species of fungus

Botrytis tracheiphila is an ascomycete fungus that is a plant pathogen.
