= Botrytis anthophila =

Scientific classification
- Kingdom: Fungi
- Division: Ascomycota
- Class: Leotiomycetes
- Order: Helotiales
- Family: Sclerotiniaceae
- Genus: Botrytis
- Species: B. anthophila

Binomial name
- Botrytis anthophila Bondartsev (1913)

Species of fungus

Botrytis anthophila is a fungal plant pathogen.
