= Botrytis narcissicola =

Scientific classification
- Kingdom: Fungi
- Division: Ascomycota
- Class: Leotiomycetes
- Order: Helotiales
- Family: Sclerotiniaceae
- Genus: Botryotinia
- Species: B. narcissicola

Binomial name
- Botryotinia narcissicola Kleb. ex Westerd. & JFH Beyma

Species of fungus

Botrytis narcissicola is a plant pathogen, a fungus that causes narcissus smoulder of daffodils, genus Narcissus.

== Bibliography ==
- T.M. O'Neill, J.W. Mansfield. INFECTION OF NARCISSUS BY BOTRYTIS NARCISSICOLA AND BOTRYTIS CINEREA. 1980.
- Hong, Sung Kee; Kim, Wan Gyu; Cho, Weon Dae; Kim, Hong Gi (2007). "Occurrence of Narcissus Smoulder Caused by Botrytis narcissicola in Korea". Mycobiology. 35 (4): 235–7. doi:10.4489/MYCO.2007.35.4.235. PMC 3763179. PMID 24015104.
