= Botryotinia polyblastis =

Scientific classification
- Domain: Eukaryota
- Kingdom: Fungi
- Division: Ascomycota
- Class: Leotiomycetes
- Order: Helotiales
- Family: Sclerotiniaceae
- Genus: Botryotinia
- Species: B. polyblastis

Binomial name
- Botryotinia polyblastis (P.H. Greg.) N.F. Buchw.

Synonyms
- Sclerotinia polyblastis P.H. Greg.

Species of fungus

Botryotinia polyblastis is a fungal plant pathogen that causes Narcissus Fire of daffodils, genus Narcissus.

== Host and symptoms ==
Botryotinia polyblastis is known to attack ornamental plants of the genus Narcissus. Plants in this genus are commonly known as daffodils, paper whites and jonquils. Botryotinia polyblastis generally attacks its host in three stages beginning with the flower and ending with an infection of the leaves. The disease first infects the flower through water soaked areas on petals and causes those petals to brown, wither and die. The disease then causes the formation of elliptical-shaped, tan leaf spots appear on the tips of the hosts leaves. The leaf spots typically start off small and can eventually grow to be greater than 5mm in length. Shortly after the appearance of leaf spots the leaves begin to exhibit chlorosis. Once the plant has lost the majority of its leaves to Botryotinia polyblastis the plant can no longer photosynthesize sufficiently and dies. The foliar symptoms caused by Botryotinia polyblastis, namely chlorosis, are often mistaken for natural senescence. However, the chlorosis of a leaf infected by Botryotinia polyblastis occurs much more rapidly and should not be mistaken for early senescence. These symptoms are also sometimes confused with those caused by Stagonospora curtisii, which is responsible for Narcissus Scorch.

== Disease cycle ==
Botryotinia polyblastis is an ascomycete and overwinters as sclerotia on infected plant tissue in the soil. Like many ascomycetes, the sclerotia of Botryotinia polyblastis germinate in the spring, once weather conditions are favorable to form an ascocarp. Botryotinia polyblastis forms an apothecium, a wide, open, saucer shaped fruiting body as its ascocarp. The apothecium contains ascospores, which are the primary inoculum. Airborne ascospores infect only the flowers of Narcissus. If the fungus cannot reproduce sexually, it will form conidia instead of ascospores. The conidia are considered to be the secondary inoculum and are responsible for foliar infections. Conidia infect leaf tissue and results in mycelium production which leads to the formation of leaf spots associated with Narcissus Fire. As a result of this, the actual fungus can be isolated from the leaf spots because the spots are made up of conidia and mycelium. Both ascospores and conidia are airborne inoculum and are most often transmitted from plant to plant via wind. Apothecial production, and therefore flower infection, generally peaks from mid-March to early April and conidial production, and therefore foliar infection, generally peaks in late April.

== Control ==
There are two main types of control that can be practice to avoid infections by Botryotinia polyblastis; cultural or chemical.

=== Cultural ===
Cultural control can help to prevent disease and stop the spread of infections that have already started in fields. In order to prevent an epidemic, basic sanitation can be practiced by removing all dead tissue from fields before planting for the next season. Another way to prevent disease is to rotate planting daffodils for two years, especially after an infection. In order to stop a current infection it is important to remove infected flowers immediately.

=== Chemical ===
Chemical means of controlling Botryotinia polyblastis involve the use of fungicides. There are many varieties of fungicides available to prevent Botryotinia polyblastis infections and they should be applied twice throughout the season, once in late March and once in late April. Dicarboximide, chlorothalonil, fludioxonil, cyprodinil, pyraclostrobin and mancozeb are all common fungicides used to treat Narcissus fire, however formulations containing dicarboximide have been shown to be most effective.

It is also possible to remove all the flowers from the fields before apothecial production and avoid having to deal with prevention or treatment of a fungal disease such as Botryotinia polyblastis.

== Bibliography ==
- Moore, WC (1959). British Parasitic Fungi. Cambridge: Cambridge University Press. p. 372. p. 343
