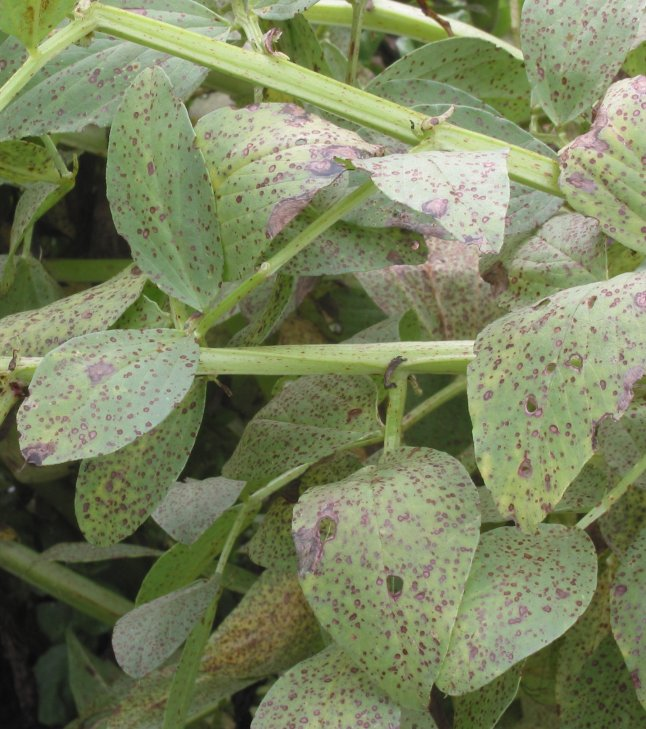
- Botrytis fabae infection on broad bean

Scientific classification
- Domain: Eukaryota
- Kingdom: Fungi
- Division: Ascomycota
- Class: Leotiomycetes
- Order: Helotiales
- Family: Sclerotiniaceae
- Genus: Botrytis
- Species: B. fabae

Binomial name
- Botrytis fabae Sardiña (1929)

= Botrytis fabae =

Species of fungus

Botrytis fabae is a plant pathogen, a fungus that causes chocolate spot disease of broad or fava bean plants, Vicia faba. It was described scientifically by Mexican-born Galician microbiologist Juan Rodríguez Sardiña in 1929.

== Symptoms ==
Chocolate spot disease caused by Botrytis fabae manifests itself as small red-brown spots on leaves, stems and flowers of broad bean plants. These enlarge and develop a grey, dead centre with a reddish-brown margin. Spores form on the dead tissue and spread the infection to other plants. In severe infections leaves and flowers may fall and badly affected stems may keel over.

== Life cycle ==
The pathogen survives as sclerotia in the soil or on crop stubble and residues. It can also be introduced by the use of infected seed. The sclerotia germinate and conidiophores are formed, the conidia (asexual spores) are dispersed by air currents and deposited by rain on susceptible young plants. When the conidia germinate, small lesions are formed on previously healthy leaves. As the crop grows and within four or five days of infection, conidiophores are produced and secondary inoculum is produced. The conidia are liberated from dead or dying leaves and flowers, usually those that have fallen to the ground, and are spread to other plants in the vicinity by wind and splashes of water. This secondary spread of infection proceeds most rapidly under cool, humid conditions, the optimum conditions being a temperature between 15 °C and 22 °C and a relative humidity of at least 90%. Under dry conditions the pathogen remains within the limits of the chocolate-coloured spots but under wet conditions the lesions expands aggressively. Alternating wet and dry conditions may lead to spots with a series of concentric growth rings, however during longer periods of wet weather the fungus thrives and the leaf is killed. After harvest the fungus remains in a semi-dormant state in plant debris until the next growing season. Infected seed may be stored with healthy seed and infect a new crop.

== Control ==
Infection can be minimised by the destruction of plant debris at the end of the season, the avoidance of sites recently used for faba bean crops and the selection of cultivars with a high level of resistance to the disease. Fungicides can be used but for best results the crop should be carefully monitored, the pathogen should be accurately identified and the crop sprayed with the correct product at the optimum time. The greatest impact of chocolate spot disease is through the loss of flowers and spraying during the flowering period is likely to achieve the greatest increase in yield.

== Distribution ==
The fungus is widely distributed, having been reported from south-east Asia, Australia, Northeast Africa and South Africa, Europe, the Middle East, North America, and South America.
