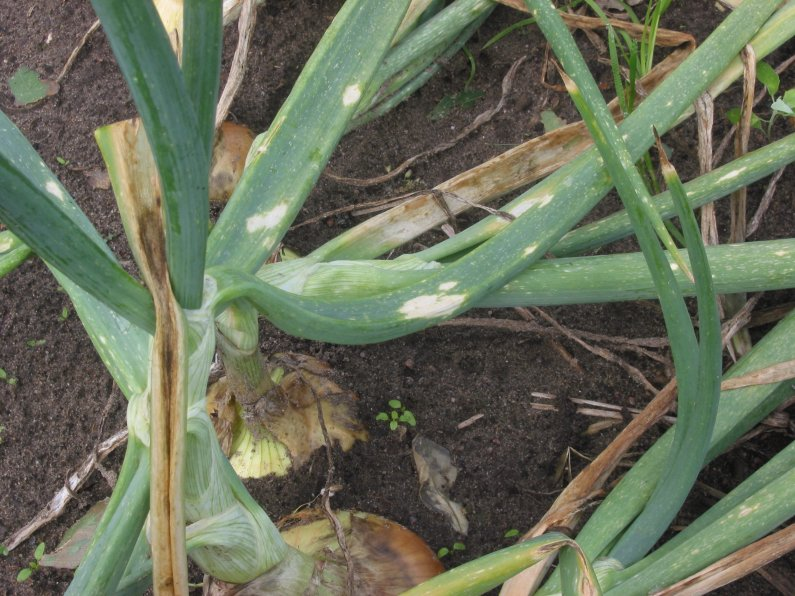
- Botrytis squamosa on an onion plant

Scientific classification
- Kingdom: Fungi
- Division: Ascomycota
- Class: Leotiomycetes
- Order: Helotiales
- Family: Sclerotiniaceae
- Genus: Botrytis
- Species: B. squamosa

Binomial name
- Botrytis squamosa J.C.Walker

= Botrytis squamosa =

Species of fungus which can damage onion crops

Botrytis squamosa (teleomorph: Botryotinia squamosa) is a fungus that causes leaf blight on onion (often termed ‘blast’) that is distinctly characterized by the two stages – leaf spotting followed by blighting. The pathogen is an ascomycete that belongs to the family Sclerotiniaceae in the order Helotiales. The lesions start out as whitish streaks and take on a yellow tinge as they mature. They cause yield losses up to 30%. This fungus is endemic to the USA and has also been reported in Europe, Asia, and Australia. Typical management of this disease includes chemical fungicides with significant efforts being made to establish a means of biological control.

== Host and symptoms ==
This pathogen only affects onion, garlic and leek – Allium spp. The first symptom of the disease occurs in the leaves 24–48 hours after initial exposure to the pathogen, appearing as long white lesions 1–5 mm in length surrounded by a greenish-white halo. The tissue then turns soft due to pectolytic enzymes produced by the pathogen and the center of the lesion takes on a straw-color. Complete blighting can be seen about 12 days after initial infection. Symptoms towards the later stages also include leaf tip dieback and necrosis. These necrotic spots are the sites of secondary conidial production.

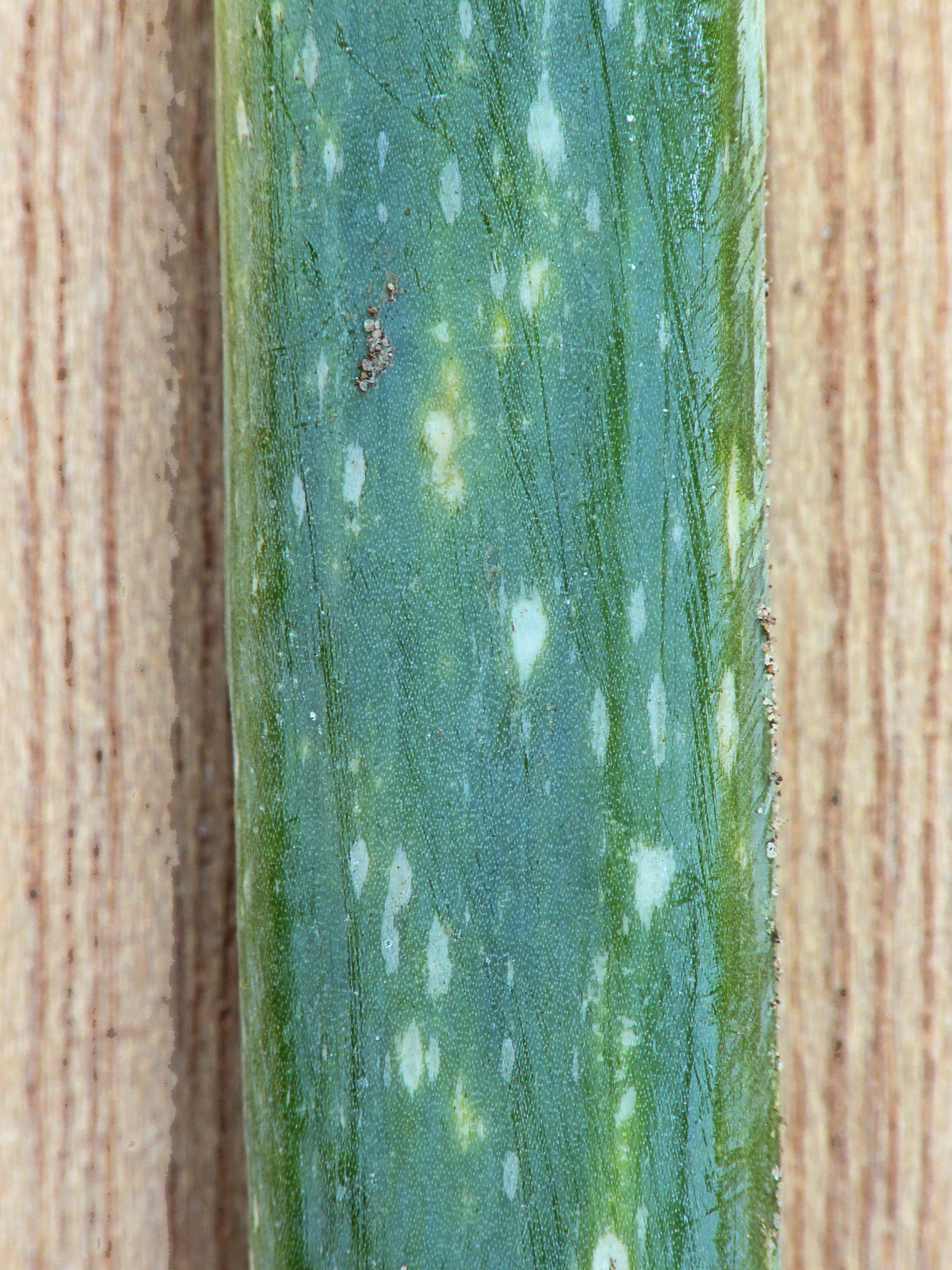
Botrytis squamosa on Allium cepa

== Disease cycle ==
As mentioned earlier, the pathogen makes sclerotia that overwinter in the field debris (infected leaves, bulbs) and cull piles and germinate in the spring. As a result of this germination, conidiophores arise that produce conidia (anamorphic phase). Apothecia also arise out of the sclerotia and release ascospores (teleomorphic phase) although these are not a very significant source of primary inoculum for infection. The sclerotia are capable of continuous and prolonged production of conidia thus resulting in a huge amount of primary inoculum. The conidia and ascospores then go on to produce primary infection on leaves causing leaf blights. Conidia are produced in the necrotic tissues that act as sources of dissemination and secondary inoculum. Towards maturity, Sclerotia are produced in the leaves and necks of infected bulbs (blackened appearance) that overwinter and germinate the following spring. Sclerotia can survive up to 21 months at a depth greater than 15 cm from the soil surface.

== Environment ==
The optimum temperature for the disease development has been reported to be 15-20 °C, the first symptom seen after 6 hours of leaf wetness, with the lesion development decreasing with increasing periods of dryness. At temperatures between 9-25 °C, lesion development increases with increasing temperature and leaf wetness. Based on studies conducted in controlled environments, sporulation on dead leaves has been found to occur with an increase in temperature until 30 °C and leaf wetness.

== Disease control ==
Chemical and cultural controls are the two most practiced ways of control. No commercial varieties resistant to B. squamosa have been reported so far. Cultural controls include avoiding cull piles and 2–3 years of rotation with non host (species other than Allium) plants. It is important to discard damaged and diseased onions at harvest. Dithiocarbamates have been identified as the most effective protectant fungicides. Weather forecasting is generally used to aid in limiting the number of sprays per cropping season. It has also been observed that ground spraying is much more effective than aerial spraying. The optimal frequency has also found to be one spray every 7–10 days.
