= Yellow onion =

Variety of onion

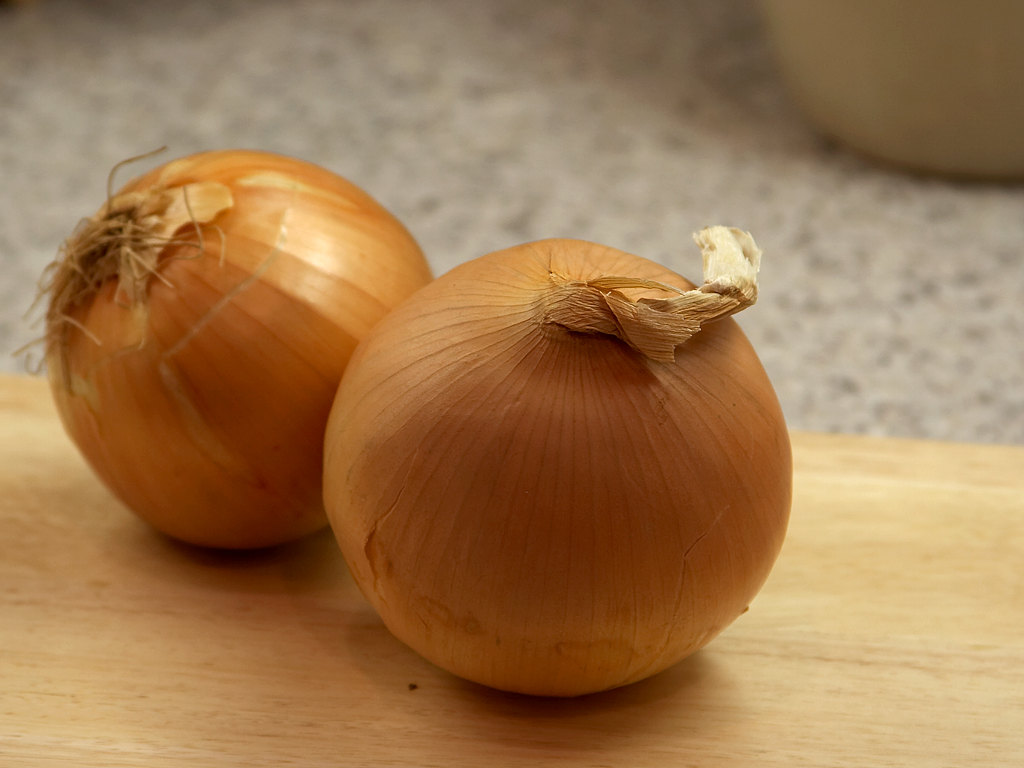
- Yellow Onion
- Genus: Allium
- Species: Allium cepa

The yellow onion or brown onion (Allium cepa L.) is a variety of dry onion with a strong flavor. It is yellow-white inside, with a brown, papery exterior.

The yellow onion is higher in sulphur content than the white onion, which gives it a stronger, more complex flavor.

A dozen varieties of yellow onion are grown, following the time of year. They vary in nutritional content, but they do contain quercetin (a flavonol).

Yellow onions are typically available throughout the year, grown between spring and fall, and then stored for the rest of the year. They are the most commonly grown onions in northern Europe, and make up 90% of onions grown in the United States. They should be stored at cool room temperature in a dark place. Longer-term storage requires them to be wrapped in paper and placed in a refrigerator. Cut or peeled onions also need to be stored in plastic in the refrigerator, but they will last only a few days.

They have a rich onion taste and are fit for dishes such as French onion soup, other soups, stews and braises, sautéed dishes, and shish kebabs. They can become sticky and sweet when caramelized.
