= Mancel Thornton Munn =

American botanist and agronomist (1887–1956)

- Born: January 31, 1887; Plainwell, MI
- Died: November 16, 1956 (aged 69); Arcadia, CA
- Resting place: Schoolcraft Township Cemetery, Vicksburg, MI
- Citizenship: U.S.
- Education: Michigan Agricultural College
- Known for: Pioneered American seed import regulations
- Scientific career
- Fields: Botany, Agronomy
- Author abbrev. (botany): Munn

Mancel Thornton Munn (January 31, 1887 in Plainwell, Michigan – November 16, 1956 in Arcadia, California) was a New York State botanist, an agronomist, and an expert in crop seed testing who pioneered some of the early American legislative efforts to regulate the import of seeds from other countries. He was also an Emeritus Professor of Seed Investigations at Cornell University.

Munn attended the Michigan Agricultural College, graduating in June 1911, and studied seed samples in accordance with the provisions of Michigan's Pure Seed Law during his final two years there. Following graduation, he accepted a position as an Assistant in Research at "the New York Experiment Station at Geneva, where he will have charge of the seed work".

Munn rose through the ranks at the Agricultural Experiment Station, being promoted to assistant botanist in 1918, Associate Botanist in 1929, and finally becoming Professor and Head of the present Department of Seed Investigation in 1936. From 1936 through1952 Munn was head of the Department of Seed Investigations, New York State Agricultural Experiment Station, Geneva, New York. He is known for developing early techniques to test seeds for viability of germplasm, and he had an interest in mycology.

== Selected publications ==
- Munn, Mancel T. (1917). "Neck-rot Disease of Onions". Bulletin of the New York State Agricultural Experiment Station. 437. Geneva, NY: New York State Agricultural Experiment Station.
- Munn, Mancel T. (1920). "The New York Seed Law and Seed Testing". Bulletin of the New York State Agricultural Experiment Station. 476. Geneva, NY: New York State Agricultural Experiment Station.
- Munn, Mancel T. (1925). "The Amended New York Seed-law and Seed Testing". Bulletin of the New York State Agricultural Experiment Station. 528. Geneva, NY: Cornell University.
- Munn, Mancel T. (1936). "The Quality of Flower Seeds on Sale in New York". Bulletin of the New York State Agricultural Experiment Station. 663. Geneva, NY: New York State Agricultural Experiment Station.
- Munn, Mancel T. (1950). "A Method for Testing the Germinability of Large Seeds". Bulletin of the New York State Agricultural Experiment Station. 740. Geneva, NY: New York State Agricultural Experiment Station.
