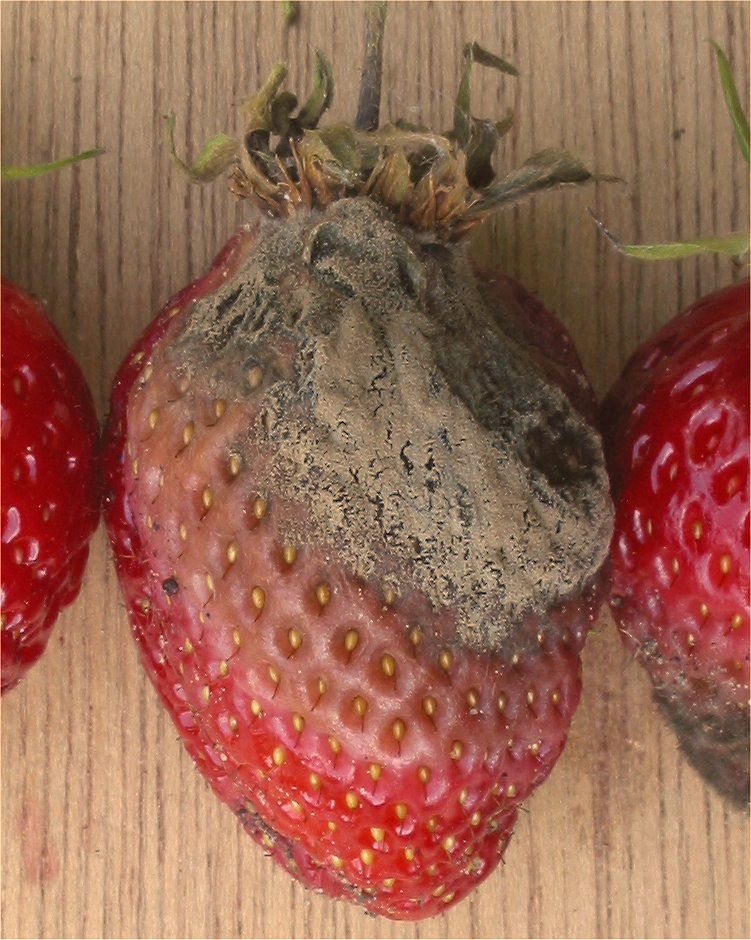
- Botrytis cinerea infection on strawberry

Scientific classification
- Kingdom: Fungi
- Division: Ascomycota
- Class: Leotiomycetes
- Order: Helotiales
- Family: Sclerotiniaceae
- Genus: Botrytis; P.Micheli ex Pers. (1794)

Type species
- Botrytis cinerea Pers. (1794)

Synonyms
- Botrytis P.Micheli (1729); Botrytis sect. Cristularia Sacc. (1886); Cephalocladium Rchb. ex Mussat (1900); Haplaria Link (1809); Polyactis Link (1809); Coccotrichum Link (1824); Penicillium Fr. (1832); Pterodinia Chevall. (1837); Phymatotrichum Bonord. (1851); Cristularia (Sacc.) Costantin (1888)

= Botrytis (fungus) =

Genus of fungi

Botrytis is a genus of anamorphic fungi in the family Sclerotiniaceae. Botrytis (also known as grey mold) belongs to the group hyphomycetes and has about 30 different species. It is a plant parasite as well as saprophytes on both agricultural and forest trees. It produces stout, dark, branching conidiophores that bear clusters of paler conidia (grey in mass) on denticles from apical ampullae. It is a common outdoor fungus and can be detected in spore trap samples. The fungus is often found growing on indoor plants. Although no mycotoxin has been reported from this fungus, it may cause hay fever, asthma and keratomycosis. The most common species is B. cinerea, which is a plant pathogen causing gray mould on a very broad range of hosts including some common ornamental plants, such as geranium, begonia, rose, lily, dogwood, rhododendron, dahlia, magnolia, camellia and fruits and produce. When this family of fungus infests grapes, it is responsible for the Noble Rot or "botrytized" flavour effect that is considered favourable in winemaking. This fungus is mainly of outdoor origin, although it may be from growth on fruits or flowers brought in from outdoors. Some houseplants can be infected by this fungus, such as cyclamen, poinsettia, chrysanthemum, and gerbera. Other species of Botrytis may be present, such as B. peoniae on peonies, B. squamosa on onion, and B. tulipae on tulips. These species of Botrytis share some common characteristics in pathology and ecology.

The generic name Botrytis is derived from the Greek bótrys ("cluster of", "grapes") and the Latin suffix -itis ("like").

== Species ==
- Botrytis aclada
- Botrytis allii
- Botrytis allii-fistulosi
- Botrytis ampelophila
- Botrytis anacardii
- Botrytis anthophila
- Botrytis argillacea
- Botrytis arisaemae
- Botrytis artocarpi
- Botrytis bifurcata
- Botrytis bryi
- Botrytis capsularum
- Botrytis carnea
- Botrytis caroliniana
- Botrytis carthami
- Botrytis cercosporaecola
- Botrytis cercosporicola
- Botrytis cinerea
- Botrytis citricola
- Botrytis citrina
- Botrytis convallariae
- Botrytis croci
- Botrytis cryptomeriae
- Botrytis densa
- Botrytis diospyri
- Botrytis elliptica
- Botrytis fabae
- Botrytis fabiopsis
- Botrytis galanthina
- Botrytis gladioli
- Botrytis gossypina
- Botrytis hormini
- Botrytis hyacinthi
- Botrytis isabellina
- Botrytis latebricola
- Botrytis liliorum
- Botrytis limacidae
- Botrytis luteobrunnea
- Botrytis lutescens
- Botrytis mali
- Botrytis monilioides
- Botrytis necans
- Botrytis paeoniae
- Botrytis peronosporoides
- Botrytis pistiae
- Botrytis platensis
- Botrytis pruinosa
- Botrytis pseudocinerea
- Botrytis pyramidalis
- Botrytis rivoltae
- Botrytis rosea
- Botrytis rubescens
- Botrytis rudiculoides
- Botrytis sekimotoi
- Botrytis septospora
- Botrytis setuligera
- Botrytis sinoallii
- Botrytis sonchina
- Botrytis splendida
- Botrytis squamosa
- Botrytis taxi
- Botrytis terrestris
- Botrytis tracheiphila
- Botrytis trifolii
- Botrytis tulipae
- Botrytis viciae-hirsutae
- Botrytis yuae

== Conidia ==
Conidia colorless, gray to pale brown, smooth, ellipsoidal, obovoid, or subspherical, mostly nonseptate. With the presence of a conidiophore, it is not difficult to identify this genus. However, it is a quite challenging to identify its conidia in the samples of spore count. Conidia of this genus are often described as unidentified fungal spores.

== Conidiophore ==
Conidiophores gray to brown, straight or flexuous, smooth, branched, often dichotomously or trichotomously, with branch ends often enlarged. A conidiophore forms a long stipe and a dense head.
