= List of Oklahoma state symbols =

Location of the state of Oklahoma in the United States of America

This is a list of Oklahoma's state symbols, including official and unofficial. The official symbols are codified by statute. Many of the unofficial symbols are defined by Oklahoma Senate or House of Representative resolutions.

== State symbols ==
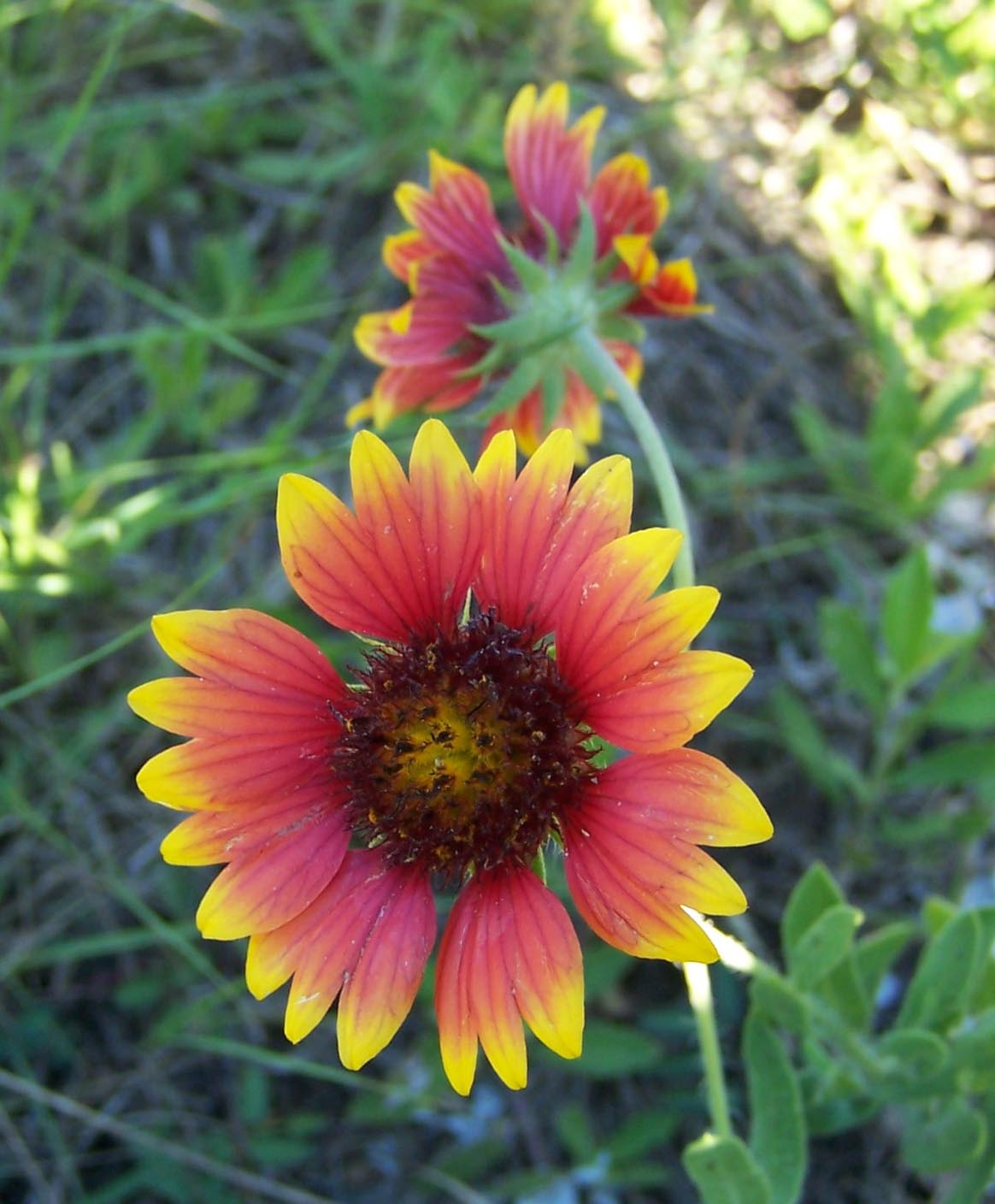
Indian blanket (Gaillardia pulchella) is Oklahoma's official state wildflower.

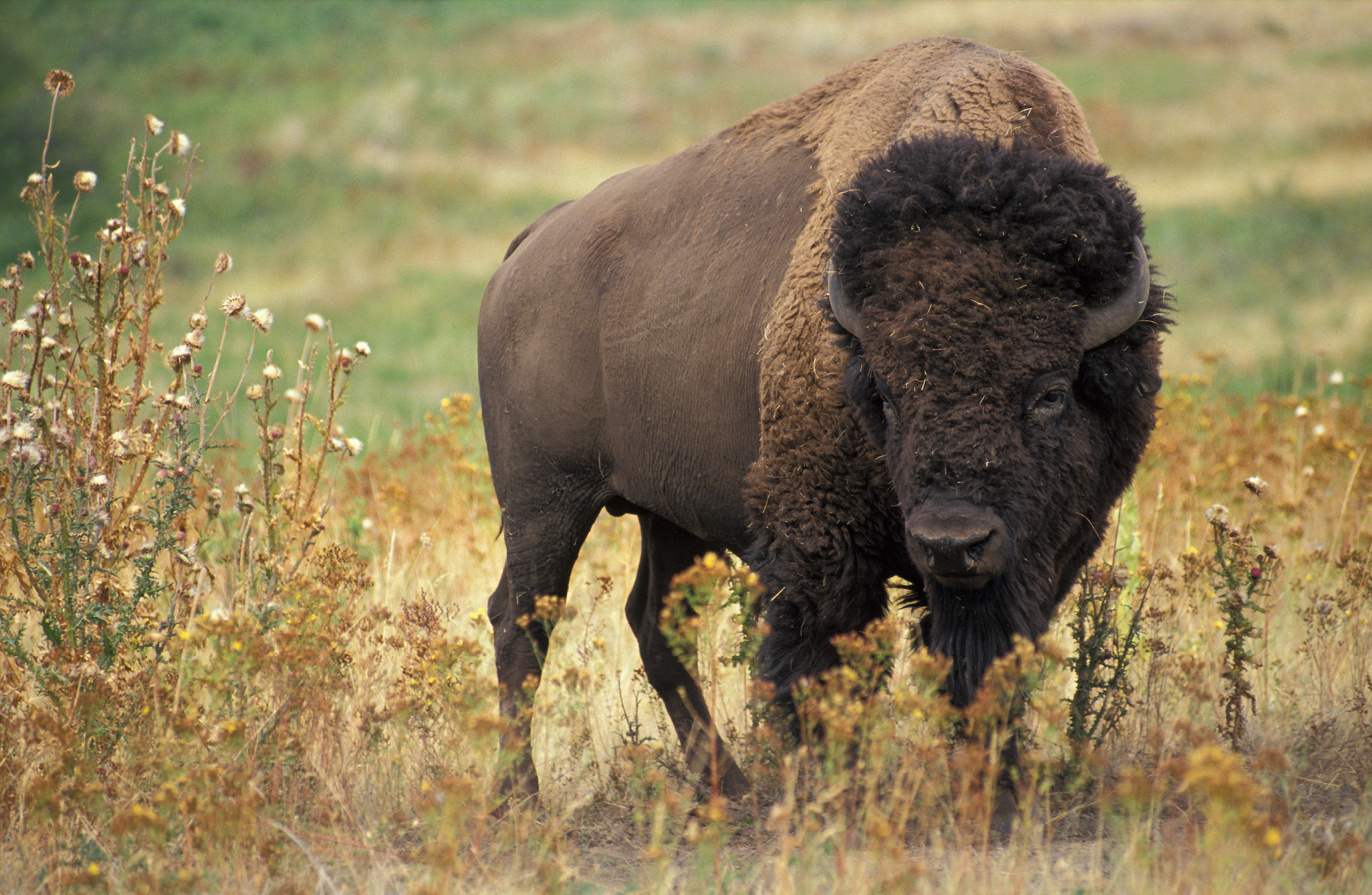
Senate Concurrent Resolution 101 (1972) designated the buffalo (Bison bison) as Oklahoma's state mammal.

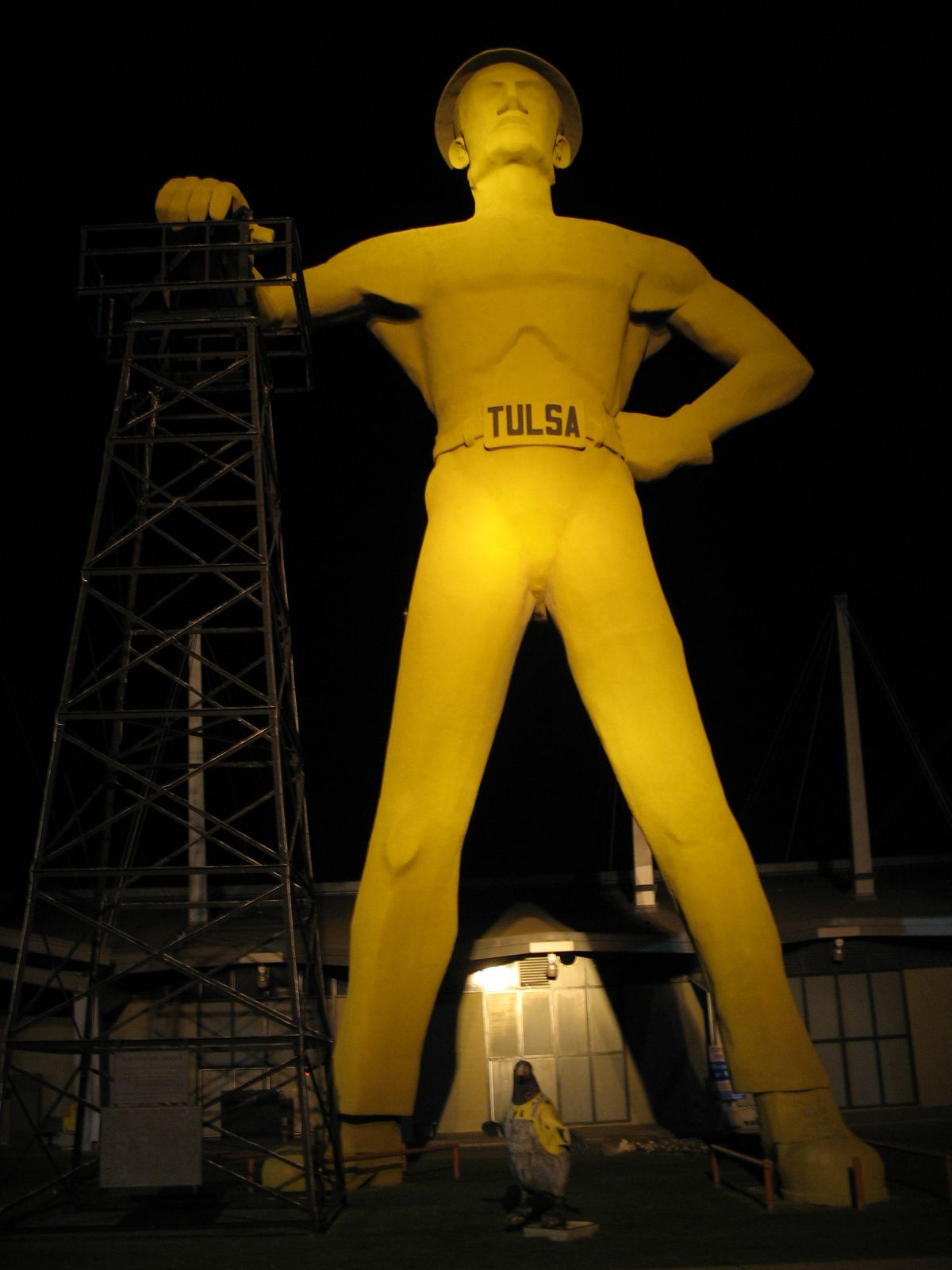
In 1979, the Oklahoma State Senate named the 76-foot-tall (23 m) Golden Driller as the state monument (SCR23, 1979).

Flora
Floral emblem	Mistletoe	25 O.S.3§92, 1893
Fruit	Watermelon	2007, c. 45, § 1
Wildflower	Indian blanket (Gaillardia pulchella)	25 O.S.3§92.1, 1986
Tree	Redbud (Cercis canadensis)	25 OS § 97, 1937 (moved to 2 OS § 16-69, 2001)
Grass	Indian grass (Sorghastrum nutans)	SCR72, 1972
Flower	Oklahoma rose	25 O.S.3§92, 2004
Vegetable	Watermelon	25 OS § 98.15, 2007
Fauna
Bird	Scissor-tailed flycatcher (Tyrannus forficatus)	25 O.S.3§98, 1951
Reptile	Collared lizard (mountain boomer Crotaphytus collaris)	HCR1009, 1969
Mammal	Buffalo (Bison bison)	SCR101, 1972
Fish	White bass (sand bass Morone chrysops)	25 O.S.3§98.2, 1974
Furbearer animal	Common raccoon (Procyon lotor)	SCR25, 1989
Insect	European honey bee (Apis mellifera)	SCR75, 1992
Game animal	White-tail deer (Odocoileus virginians)	SCR24, 1990
Game bird	Wild turkey (Meleagris gallopavo)	25 O.S.3§98.13,1990
Butterfly	Black swallowtail (Papilio polyxenes)	HB2082, 1996
Amphibian	Bullfrog (Rana catesbeiana)	HCR1026, 1997
Fossil	Saurophaganax maximus	25 O.S.3§98.6, 2000
Flying mammal	Mexican free-tailed bat (Tadarida brasiliensis)	25 O.S.3§98.11, 2006
Dinosaur	Acrocanthosaurus atokensis	25 O.S.3§98.14, 2006
Raptor	Red-tailed Hawk (Buteo jamaicensis)	HB2997, 2018
Music
Waltz	"Oklahoma Wind"	SR42, 1982
Anthem	"Oklahoma!" lyrics: Oscar Hammerstein II music: Richard Rodgers	25 O.S.3§94.1, 1953
Folk song	"Oklahoma Hills" by Woody Guthrie and Jack Guthrie	25 O.S.3§94.8, 2001
Musical instrument	Fiddle	SCR25, 1984
Country and western song	"Faded Love" by John Willis and Bob Wills	SCR65, 1988
Folk dance	Square dance	SCR111, 1988
Percussive musical instrument	Drum	25 O.S.3§98.3, 1993
Children's song	"Oklahoma, My Native Land" by Martha Kemm Barrett	HB3000, 1996
Western band	The Sounds of the Southwest	HCR1053, 1997
Inspirational Song	"I Can Only Imagine" by MercyMe	HB3473, 2018
Other
Language	English	State Question 751
Astronomical object	Rosette Nebula, NGC 2237	25 O.S. §25-98.18, 2019
Cartoon character	GUSTY	25 O.S.3§98.9, 2005
Colors	Green and white	25 O.S.3§93, 1915
Rock	Rose rock (Barite rose)	25 O.S.3§98.1, 1968
State monument	Golden Driller	SCR23, 1979
Theater	Lynn Riggs Players of Oklahoma, Inc.	53 OS § 81
Theatre	Lyric Theatre of Oklahoma	SB 1385, 2022
Poem	"Howdy Folks" by David Randolph Milsten	HCR7, 1941
Pin	"OK" pin	SCR36, 1982
Beverage	Milk	SCR2, 1985
Soil	Port Silt Loam Cumulic haplustolls	HJR1014, 1987
Meal	Oklahoma state meal: fried okra, squash, cornbread, barbecued pork, biscuits, sausage and gravy, grits, corn, strawberries, chicken fried steak, pecan pie, and black-eyed peas.	HCR 1083, 1988
Steak	Ribeye	25 O.S. §25-98.19, 2019
Poet laureate	Biennial gubernatorial appointment	1994
Tartan	Oklahoma Tartan	HCR1025, 1999
Stamp	Oklahoma Statehood Stamp which celebrates the 100th birthday of Oklahoma's entry into the Union, November 16, 1907	Issued by the United States Postal Service

== See also ==
- List of U.S. state, district, and territorial insignia
- Oklahoma
- Outline of Oklahoma
