= Brint's Diner =

Restaurant in Wichita, Kansas, U.S.

- Interactive map of Brint's Diner

Restaurant information
- Location: 4834 East Lincoln Street, Wichita, Kansas, 67218, United States
- Coordinates: 37°40′22″N 97°16′45″W

Brint's Diner was a restaurant in Wichita, Kansas, United States. It was featured on the Food Network series Diners, Drive-Ins and Dives.

The menu included comfort food such as chicken-fried steak and the "ultimate skillet", which had eggs, ham, sausage, fries, onions, and peppers. The restaurant closed permanently in October 2014.

== See also ==
- List of defunct restaurants of the United States
- List of Diners, Drive-Ins and Dives episodes
