= Chicken-fried steak =

American breaded cutlet dish

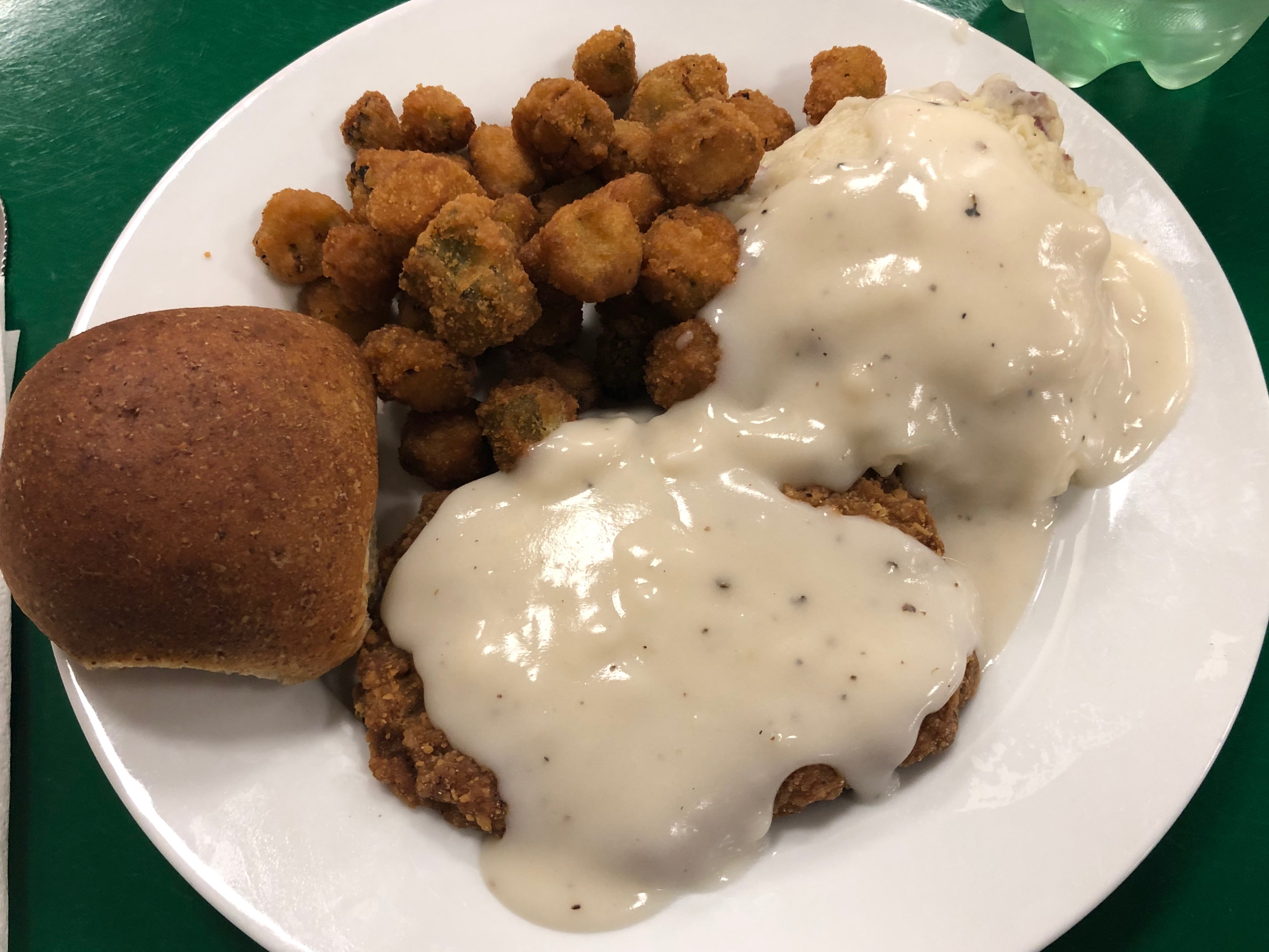
- Chicken-fried steak smothered in cream gravy with sides of mashed potatoes, fried okra and a dinner roll
- Course: Main course
- Place of origin: United States
- Region or state: West Texas/Oklahoma
- Serving temperature: Hot
- Main ingredients: Tenderized cube steak, flour

Chicken-fried steak, also known as country-fried steak, is an American Southern breaded cutlet dish consisting of a piece of beefsteak (most often tenderized cube steak) coated with seasoned flour and either deep-fried or pan-fried. It is associated with the Southern cuisine of the United States. It is breaded and fried with a technique similar to the more common fried chicken, hence "chicken-fried". When deep-fried, it is usually referred to as "chicken-fried steak". Pan-fried versions are typically referred to as "country-fried steak".

Chicken-fried steak resembles the Austrian dish Wiener schnitzel, the Japanese dish gyukatsu, the Italian dish cotoletta alla milanese and is almost the same as Argentine milanesa. It is a tenderized veal or pork cutlet, coated with flour, eggs, chicken stock cube, and bread crumbs, and then fried. It is also similar to the recipe for Scottish collops.

== History ==
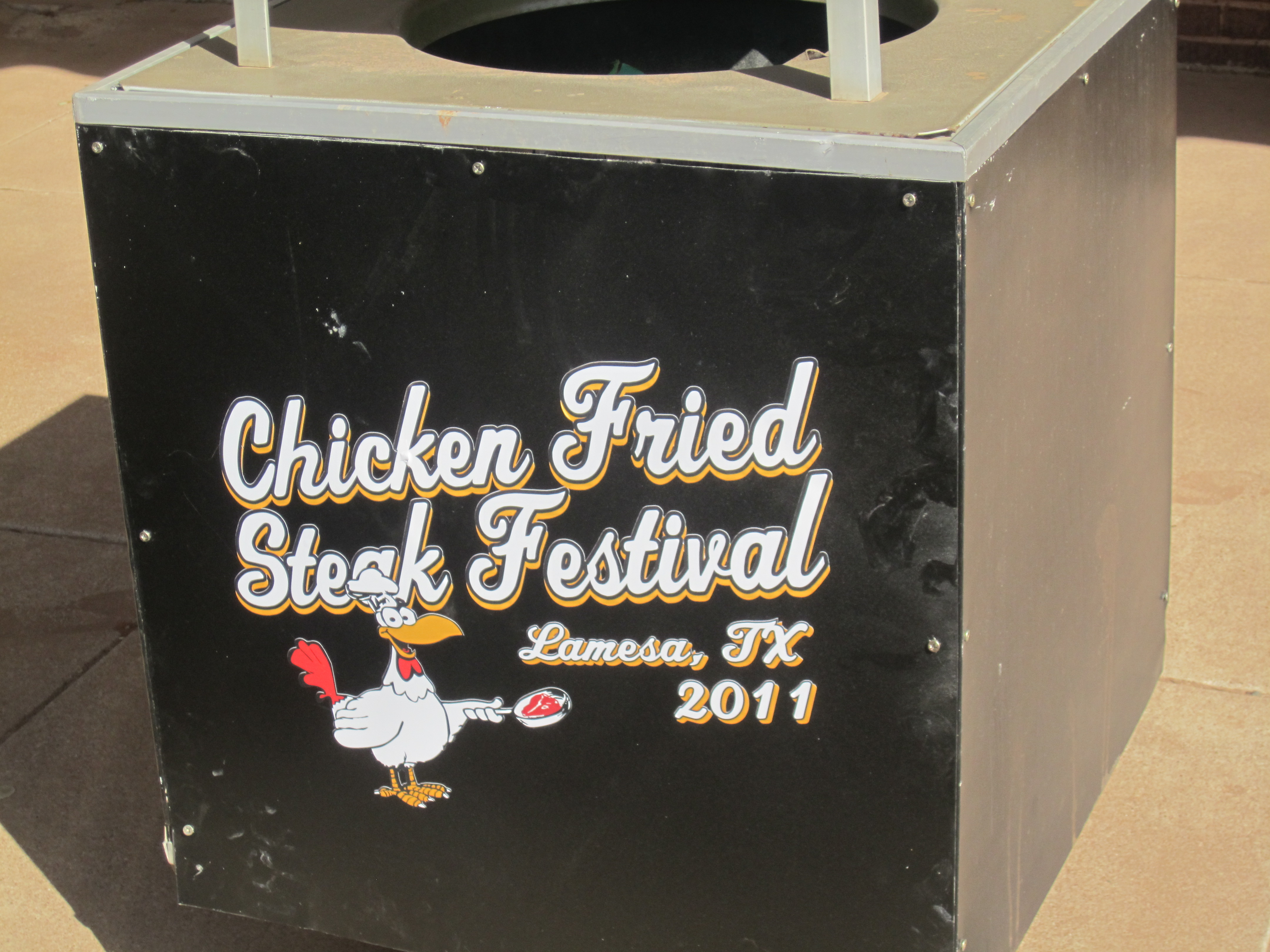
Lamesa, Texas, hosts an annual chicken-fried steak celebration.

The precise origins of the dish are unclear, but many sources attribute its development to German and Austrian immigrants to Texas in the 19th century, who brought recipes for Wiener schnitzel from Europe to the USA. Lamesa, the seat of Dawson County on the Texas South Plains, claims to be the birthplace of chicken-fried steak, and hosts an annual celebration accordingly.

The Virginia Housewife, published in 1838 by Mary Randolph, has a recipe for veal cutlets that is one of the earliest recipes for a food like chicken-fried steak. The recipe for what we now know as chicken-fried steak was included in many regional cookbooks by the late 19th century. The Oxford English Dictionary's earliest attestation of the term "chicken-fried steak" is from a restaurant advertisement in the 19 June 1914 edition of the Colorado Springs Gazette newspaper.

A 1943 American cookbook recipe for Wiener schnitzel includes a white salt and pepper cream gravy.

Chicken-fried steak is among numerous popular dishes which make up the official state meal of Oklahoma, added to the list in 1988.

== Preparation ==
Chicken-fried steak is prepared by taking a thin cut of beefsteak and tenderizing it by pounding, cubing, or forking. It is then immersed in egg batter or buttermilk, then dredged in flour to which salt, pepper, and often other seasonings have been added. Chicken-fried steak is typically deep-fried and served with cream gravy, while country fried steak is typically fried in a skillet and served with brown gravy. The frying medium has traditionally been shortening, but butter and lard have sometimes been used instead. Health concerns have led many cooks to replace the shortening with vegetable oil.

When there are problems with the breading separating from the meat while cooking, it can be very useful to first dredge the meat in the flour mixture, then the egg or buttermilk, and then the flour mixture again, and then let it sit for a half-hour or more before cooking.

The cuts of steak used for chicken-fried steak are usually the less expensive, less desirable ones, such as cube steak, chuck, round steak, and occasionally flank steak. The method may be used for chopped or ground beef, but it is not called chicken-fried steak. Chicken-fried steak is usually served for lunch or dinner topped with cream gravy and with mashed potatoes, vegetables, and biscuits or Texas toast served on the side. In the Midwest, it is also common to serve chicken-fried steak for breakfast, along with toast and hash browns.

The steak can be served on a hamburger bun with cream gravy as a "chicken-fried steak sandwich". It can also be cubed and stuffed in a baked potato with gravy and cheese.

Alternatively, the tenderized steak may be cut into strips, breaded, deep-fried, and served for breakfast with eggs and toast or for other meals in a basket with fries and cream gravy. Known as "finger steaks" or "steak fingers", this is a popular dish in the state of Idaho.

== Variants ==
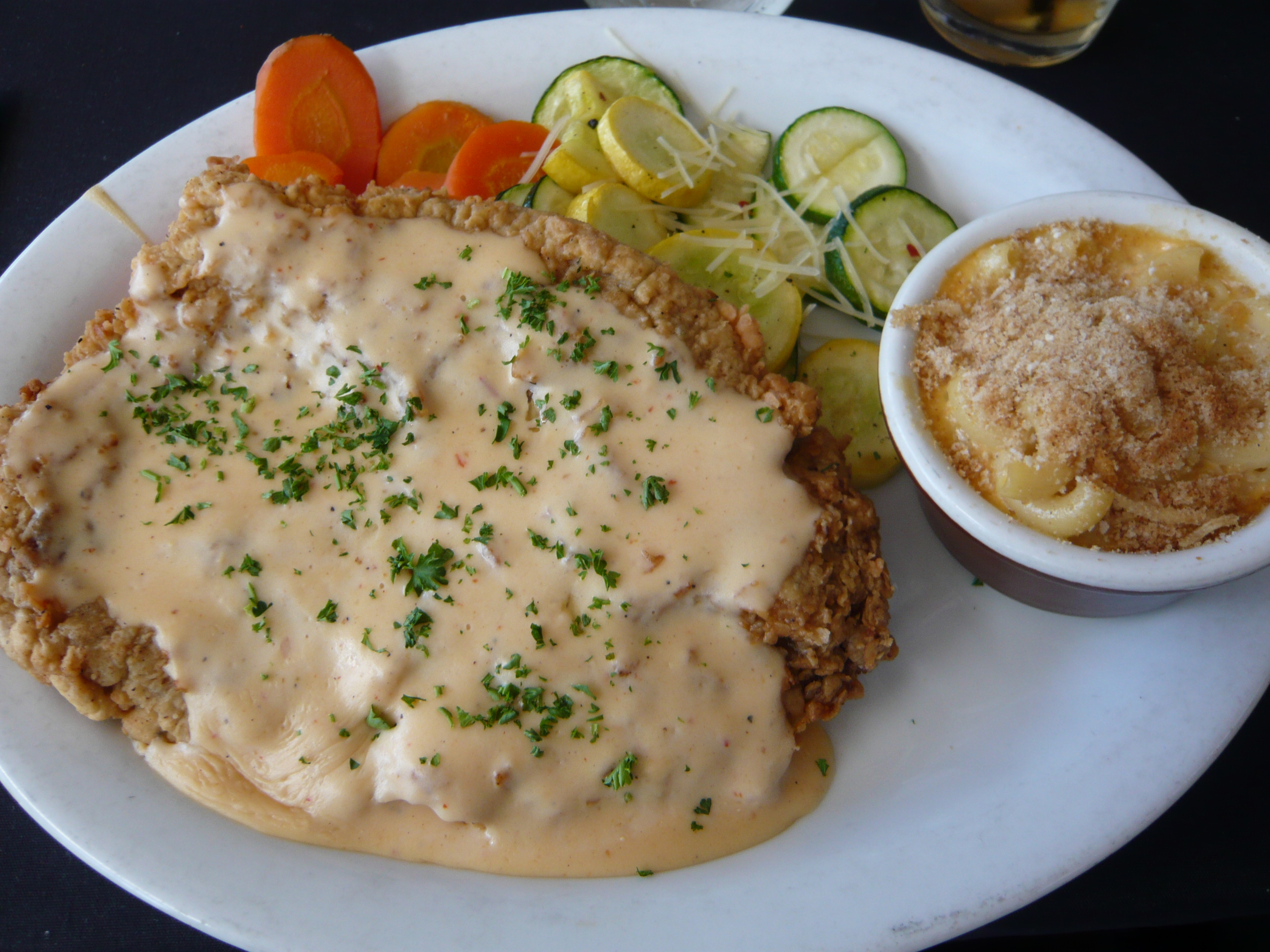
Chicken-fried steak with chipotle cream gravy

In Texas and neighboring states, chicken fried steak is commonly prepared by either deep frying or pan-frying in a generous layer of oil. It is typically served with the classic accompaniment of peppered milk gravy.

Regionally, the pan-fried variation is sometimes known as "country fried steak." Although some recipes and dining establishments opt for the traditional peppered milk gravy with country fried steak, a distinctive version featuring a brown, beef stock-based gravy with onions is prevalent. This variation serves as the main distinguishing factor between the two dishes in regions where both are enjoyed.

== See also ==
- Chicken fried bacon
- City chicken
- Cotoletta
- List of regional dishes of the United States
- Parmo
- Parmigiana
- Schnitzel
- Tonkatsu
- Milanesa
