= Meat chop =

Cut of meat served as individual portion

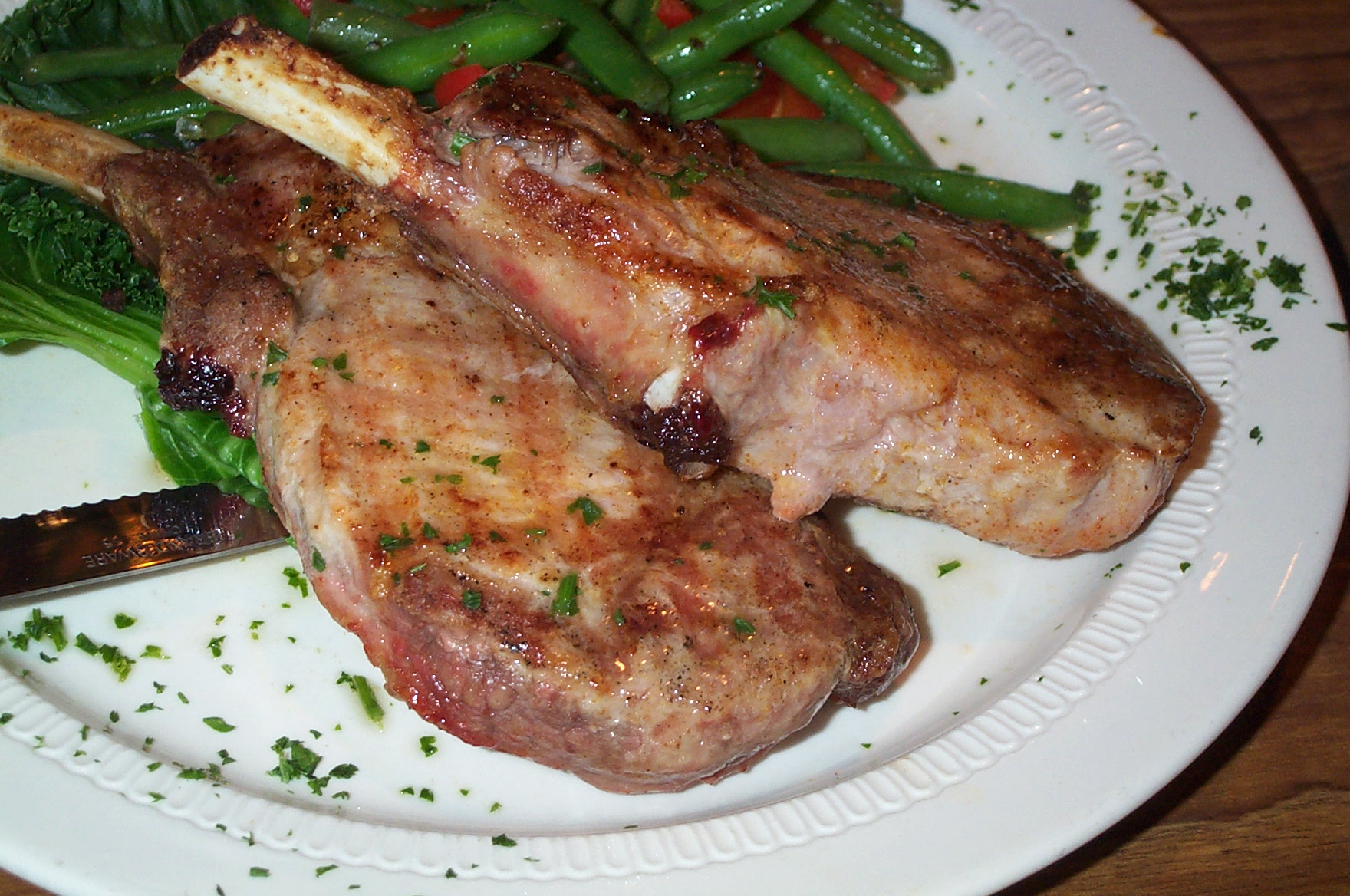
Pork chops

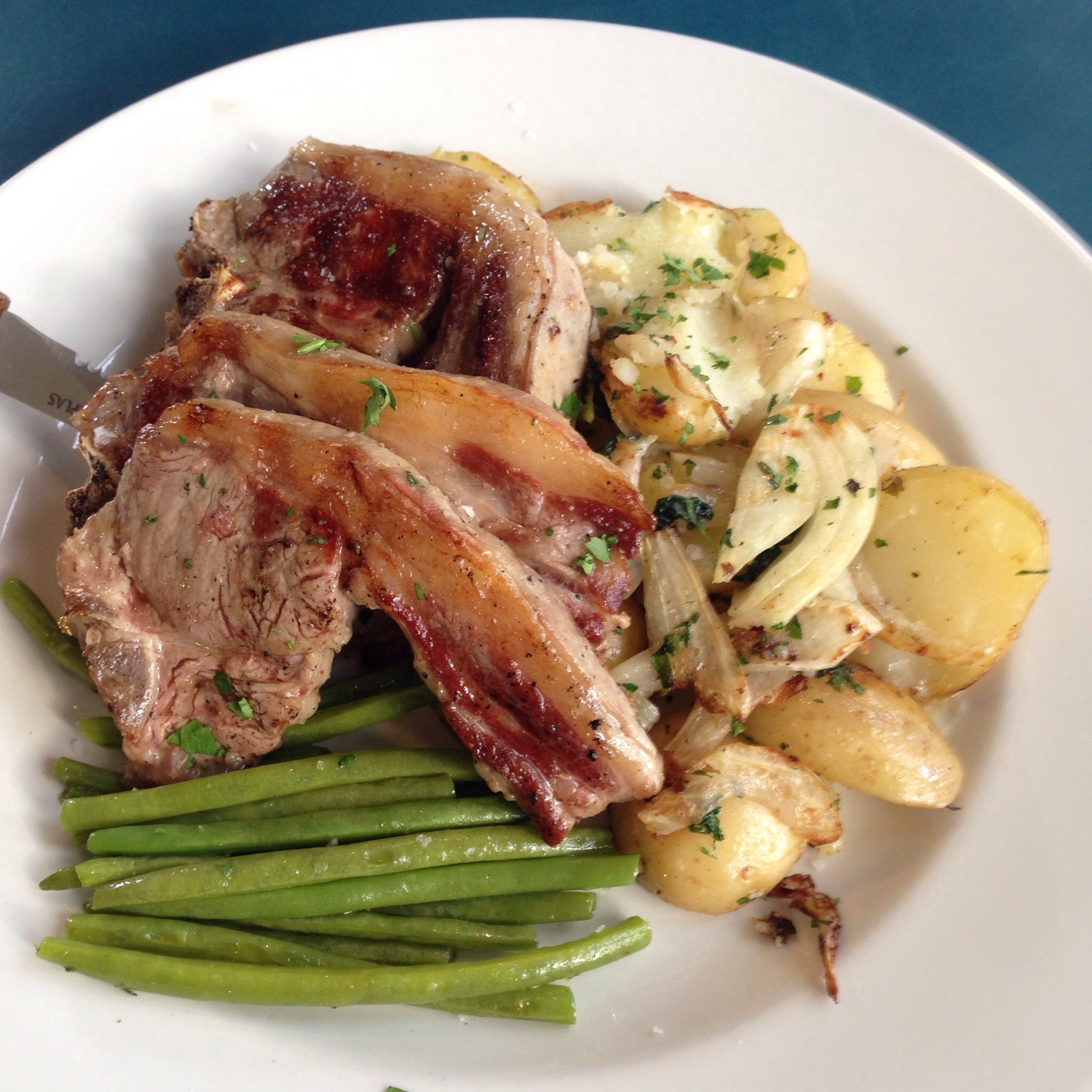
Lamb chops with new potatoes and green beans

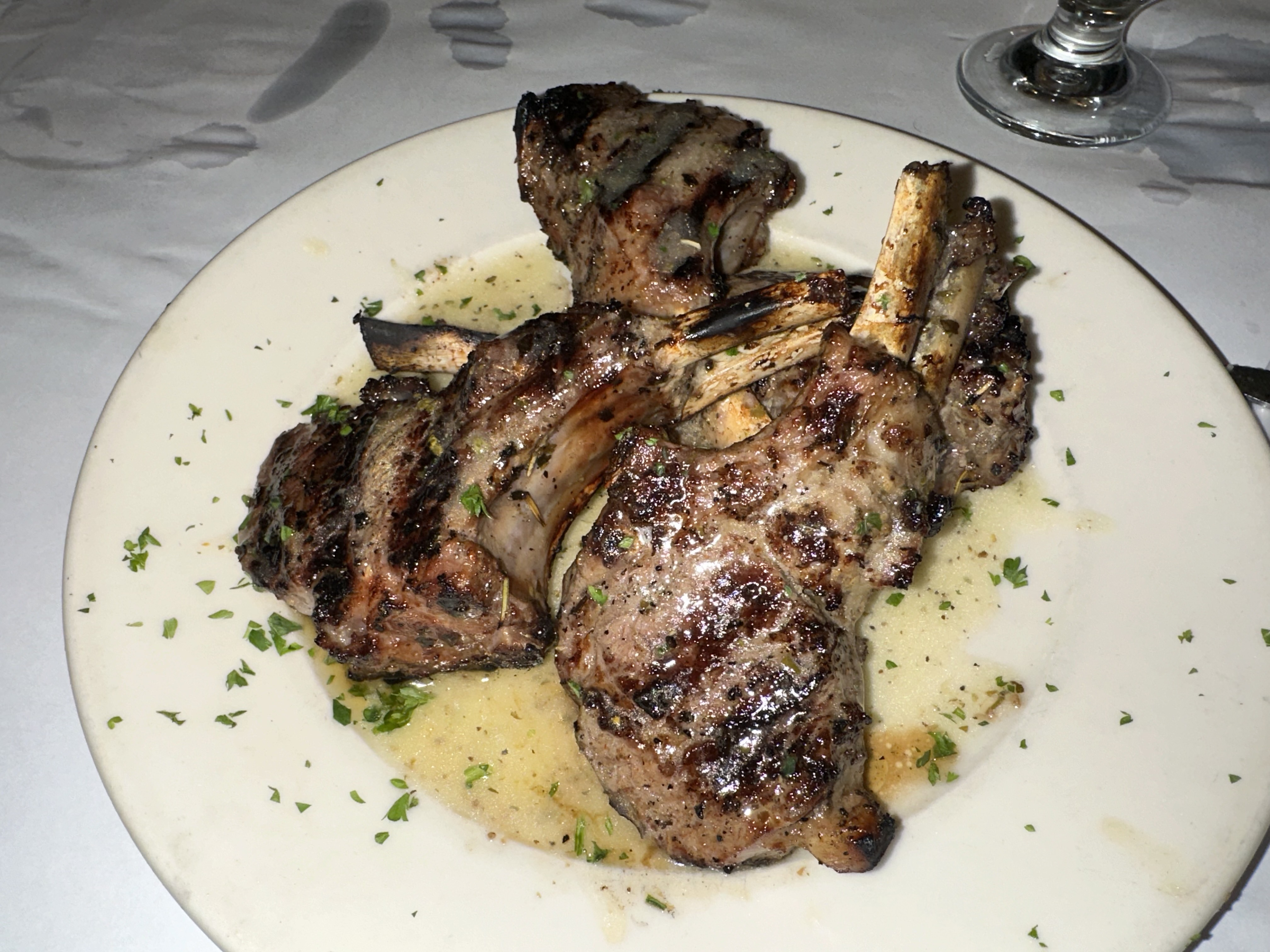
A plate of lamb chops from a Greek restaurant in Fort Lauderdale, Florida

A meat chop is a cut of meat cut perpendicular to the spine, and usually containing a rib or riblet part of a vertebra and served as an individual portion. The most common kinds of meat chops are pork and lamb. A thin boneless chop, or one with only the rib bone, may be called a cutlet, though the difference is not always clear. The term "chop" is not usually used for beef, but a T-bone steak is essentially a loin chop, a rib steak and a rib cutlet.

== Butchery ==
Chops are generally cut from pork, lamb, veal, or mutton, but also from game, such as venison. They are cut perpendicular to the spine, and usually include a rib and a section of spine. They are typically cut from 10–50 mm thick.

In United States markets, pork chops are classified as "center-cut" or "shoulder". Lamb chops are classified as shoulder, blade, rib, loin or kidney, and leg or sirloin chops. The rib chops are narrower and fattier, while the loin chops are broader and leaner. Lamb chops are sometimes cut with an attached piece of kidney.

Chops may either be cut by separating the ribs using a knife and then cutting the spine with a hacksaw or cleaver, or by sawing perpendicularly to the spine using a band saw, which cuts across some ribs diagonally. Chops are sometimes beaten with the side of a cleaver or with a meat mallet to make them thinner and more tender.

== Cooking ==
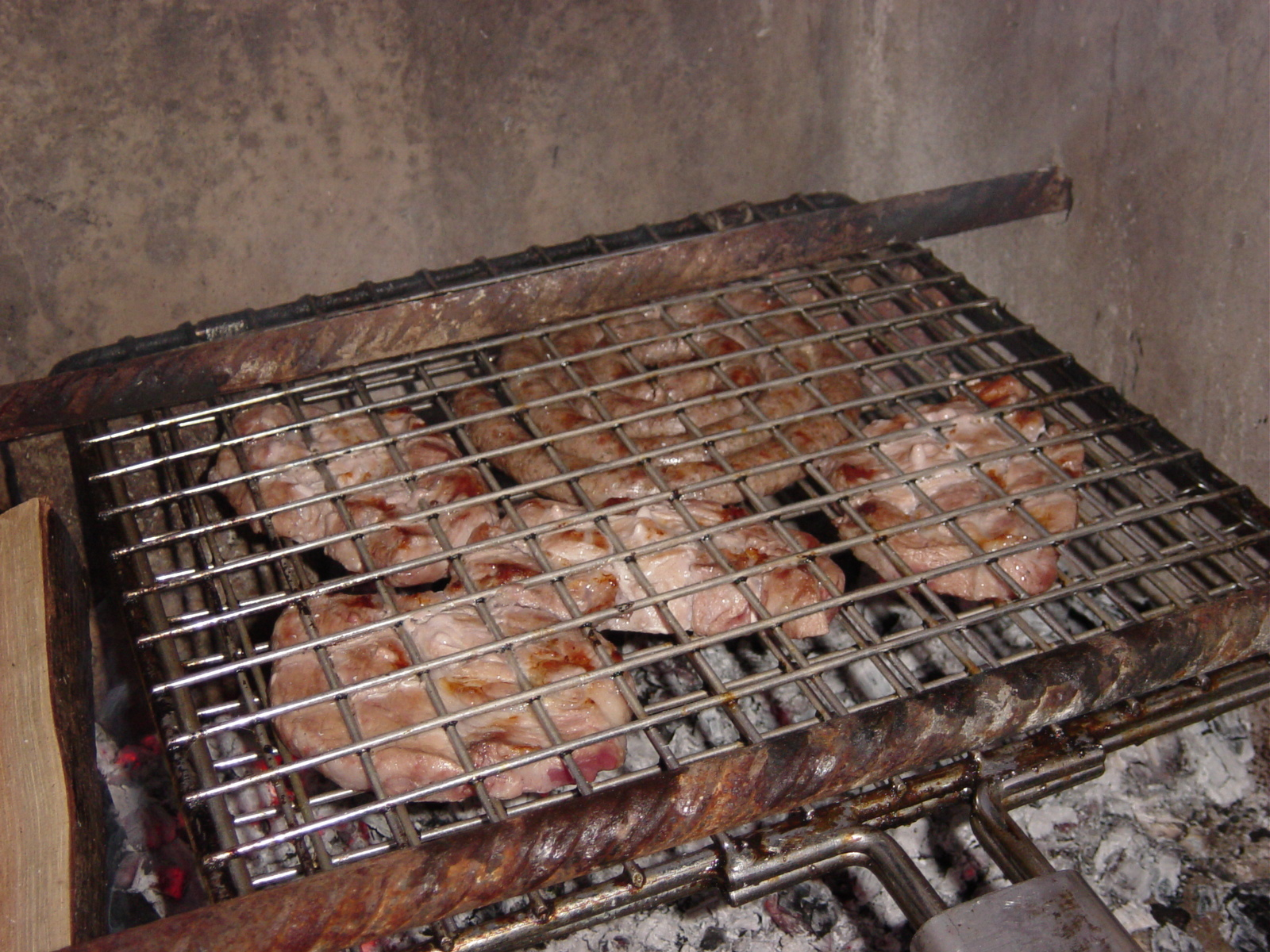
A traditional outdoor grill (braai) of pork chops and sausages in South Africa.

Chops may be cooked in various ways, including grilling, pan-broiling, sautéeing, braising, breading and frying, and baking. Lamb chops are often cooked with dry heat, grilled or pan-broiled. Pork chops and veal chops are grilled, sautéed, or braised, or breaded and fried (milanese). In South Africa and Namibia the traditional way of cooking chops is to grill them outdoor over open fire coals, called braaiing.

== History ==
In Great Britain, the idea of a chop comes from the 17th century, when London chophouses started cooking individual portions of meat.

== See also ==
- Rib chop
- List of steak dishes
- Meat on the bone
- Pork steak
- Steak
