= Oklahoma state meal =

State meal/emblem

The official Oklahoma state meal is a state emblem of Oklahoma. While many U.S. states have one or more official foods, Oklahoma's is the only official state meal.

The meal includes cornbread, the meats barbecued pork, chicken-fried steak, and sausage with biscuits and gravy, the vegetables black-eyed peas, corn, fried okra, grits, and squash, and pecan pie and strawberries for dessert. The dishes are typical of Southern cuisine. Menu items include historic staple foods of the region and represent state agricultural production.

The meal was established by the 41st Oklahoma Legislature through House Concurrent Resolution 1983 in 1988. The menu selection process included input from the Oklahoma Department of Agriculture, the Oklahoma Restaurant Association, the Oklahoma Pork Council, the Oklahoma Beef Commission, the Oklahoma Wheat Commission, and some food-processing companies. April 19, 1988 was "Oklahoma Meal Day", and restaurants were encouraged to offer the meal.

Depending on portion sizes, the entire meal might contain 2,700 calories, 125 g fat, and 5,250 mg sodium, all in excess of a day's recommended intake. State Senator Brian Crain proposed a concurrent resolution which would repeal the meal. It did not pass and was only intended as a symbolic measure.

== Gallery ==
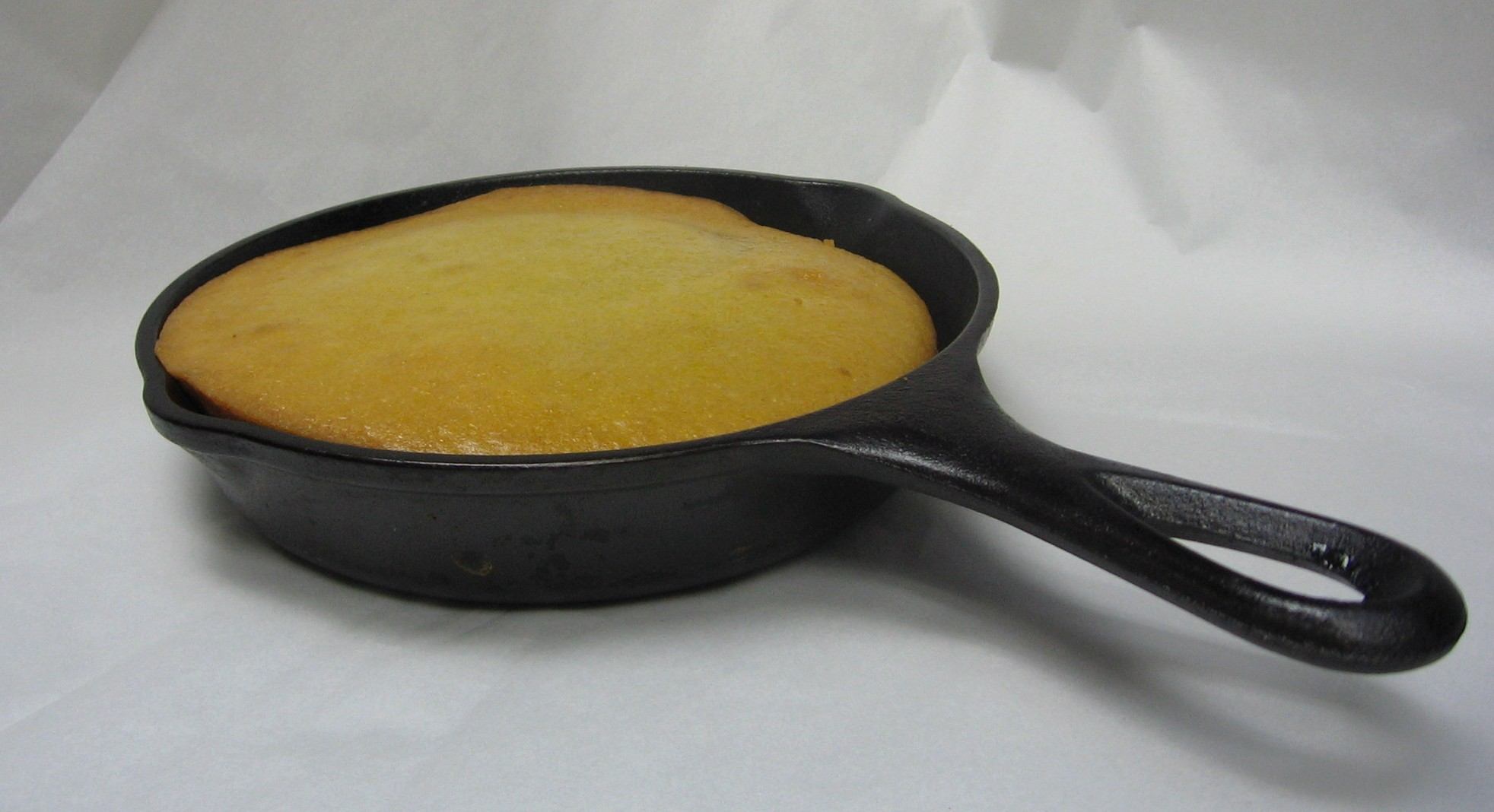
Cornbread

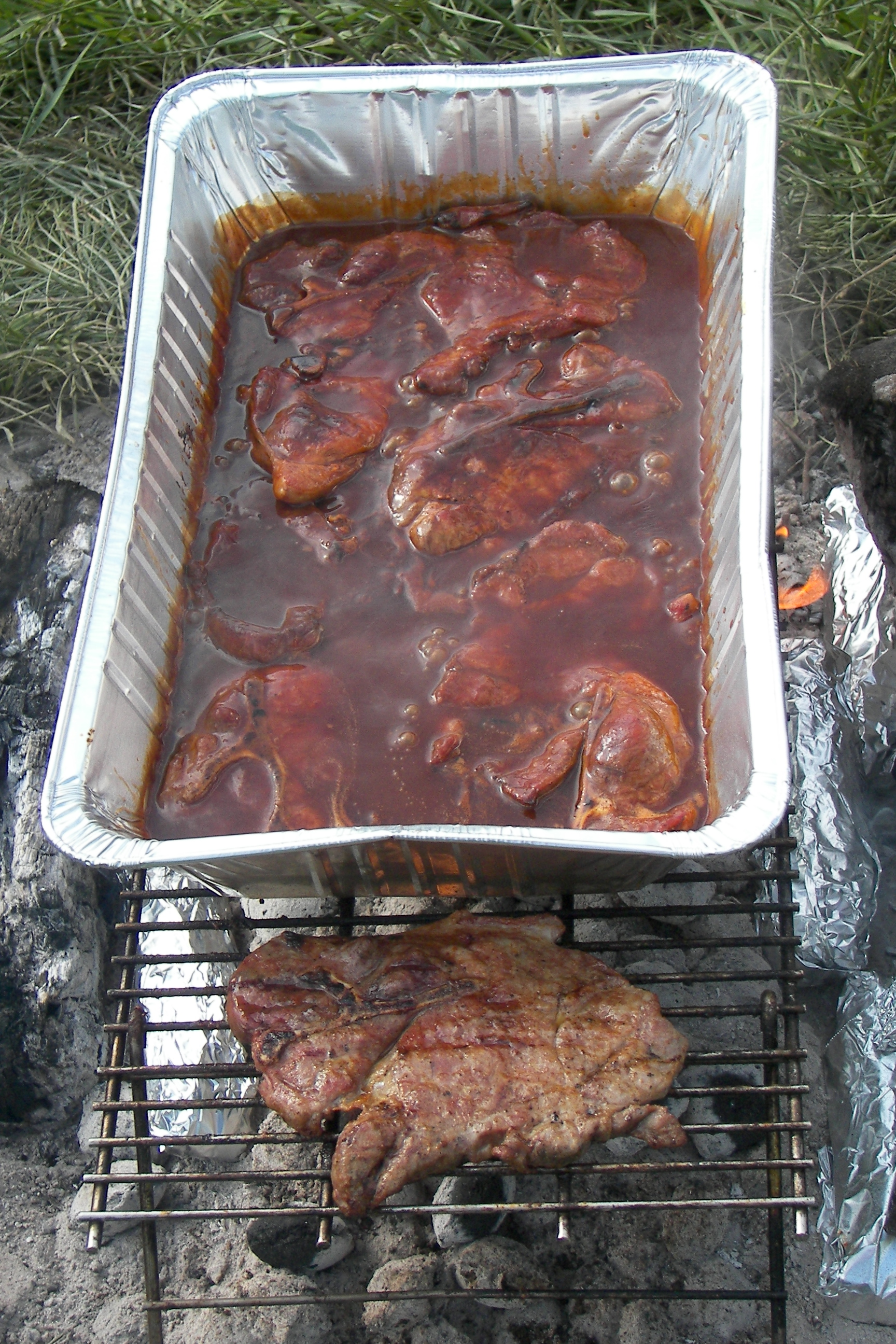
Barbecued pork

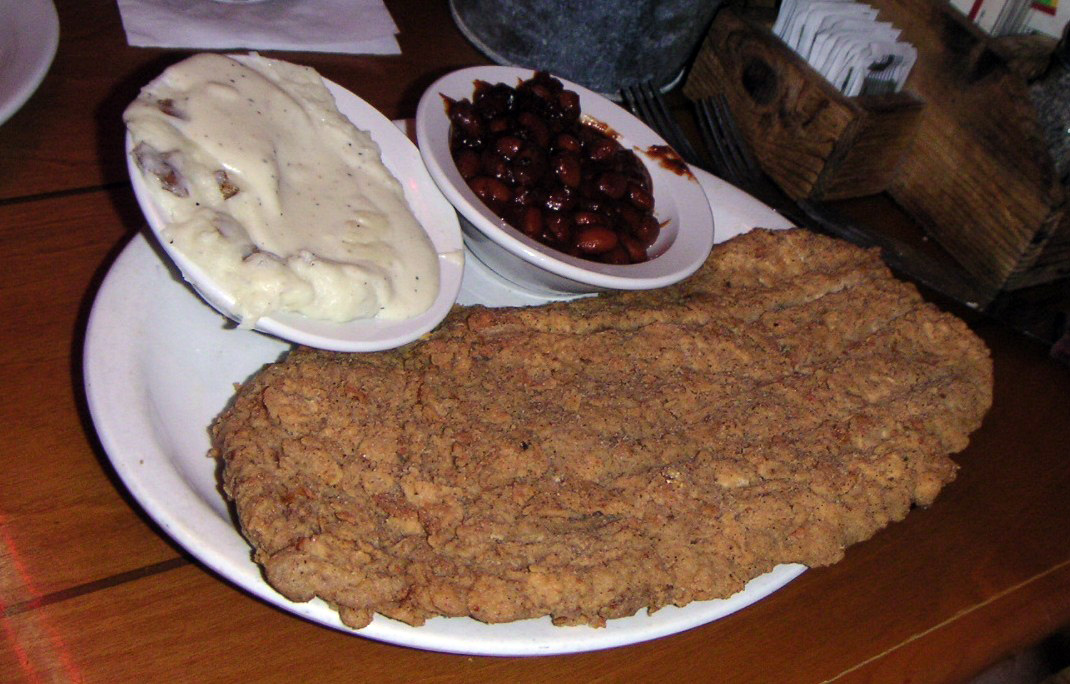
Chicken-fried steak

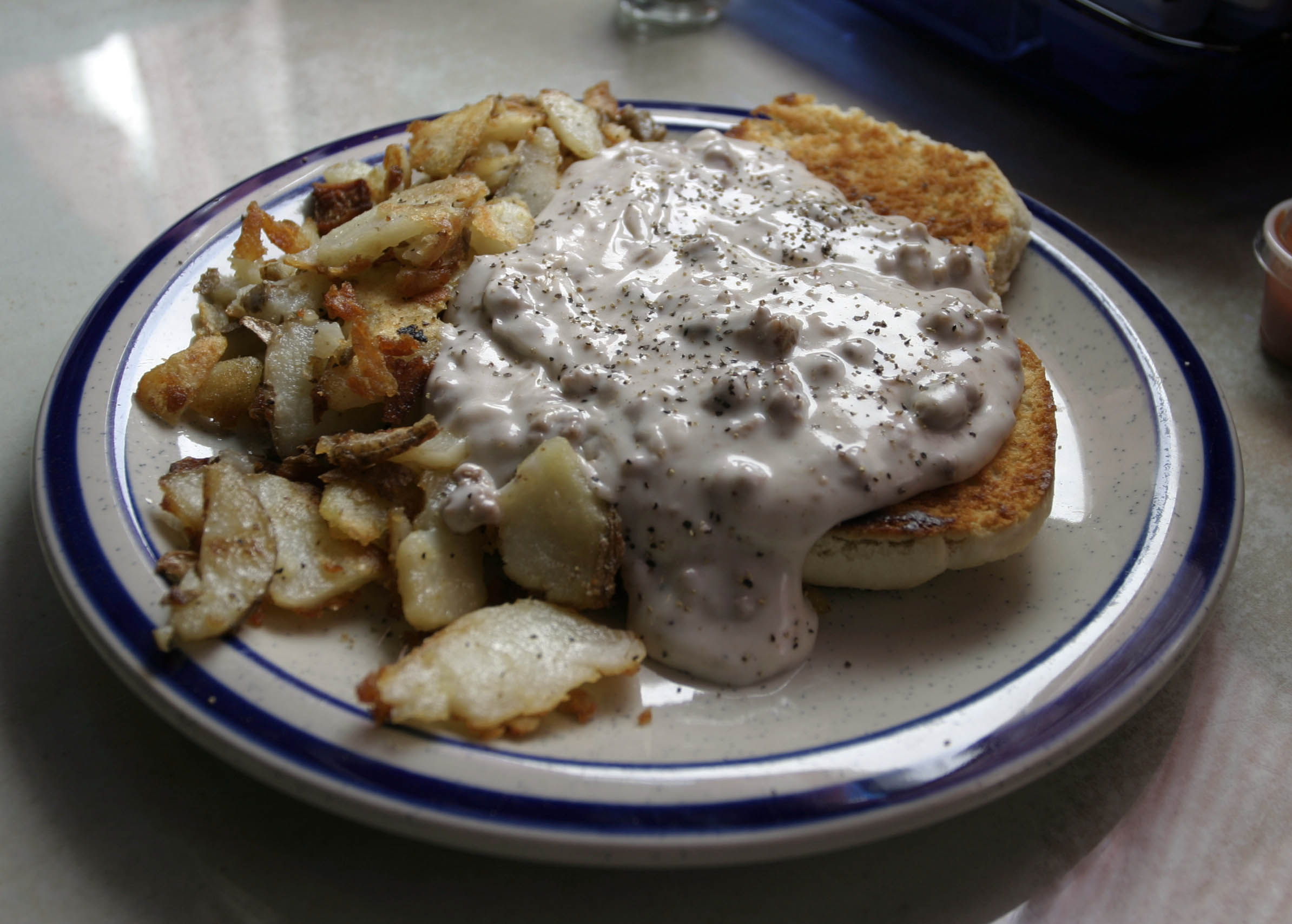
Biscuits and gravy

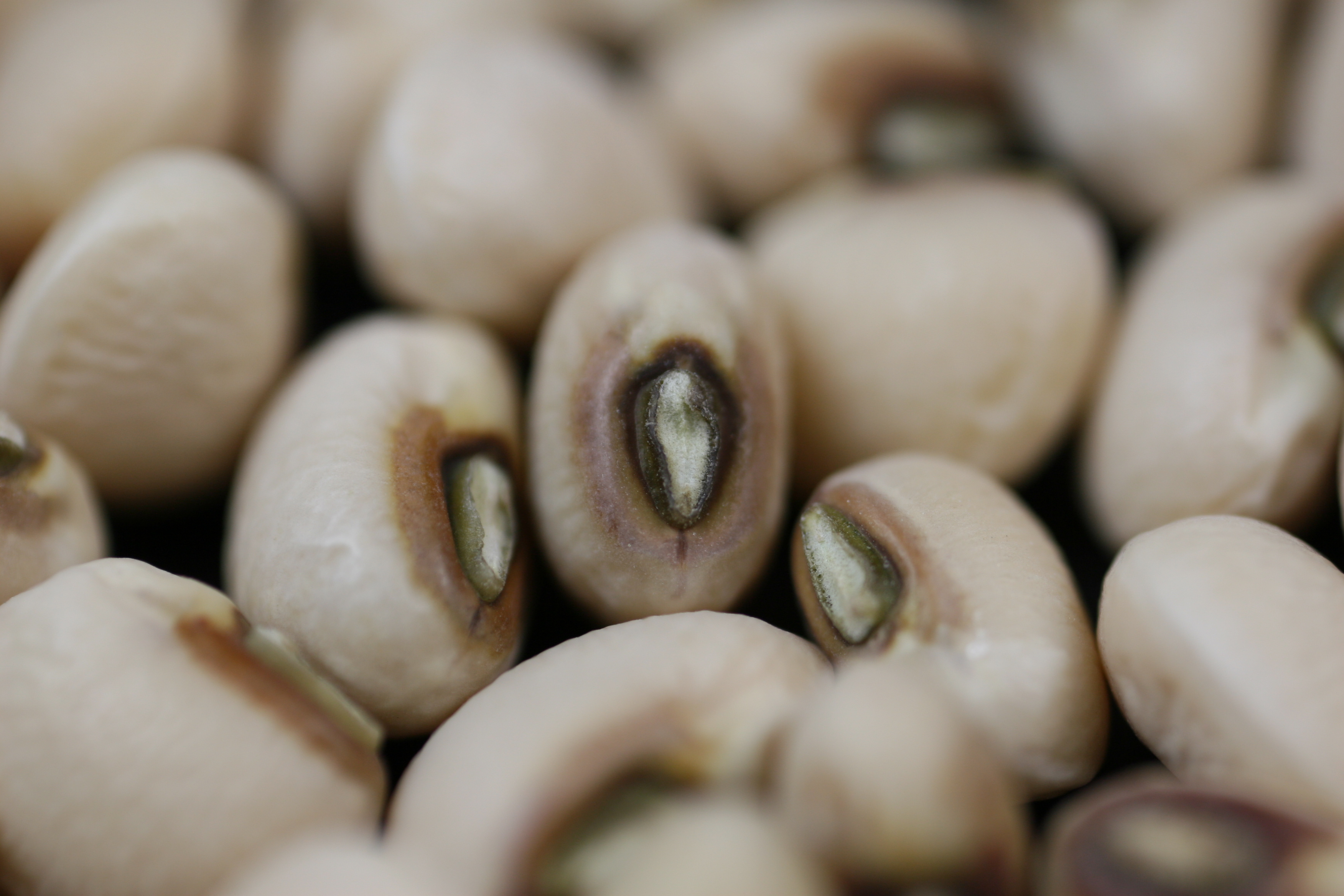
Black-eyed peas

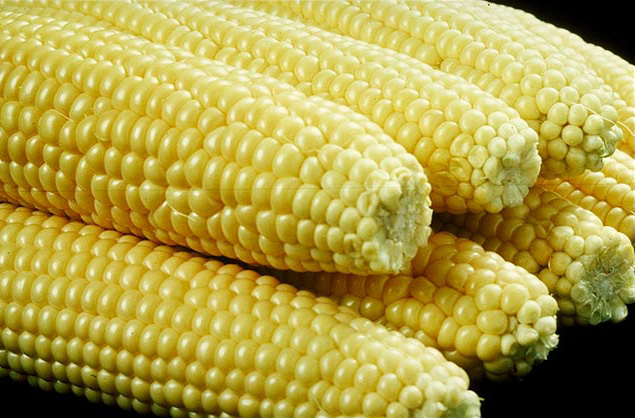
Corn

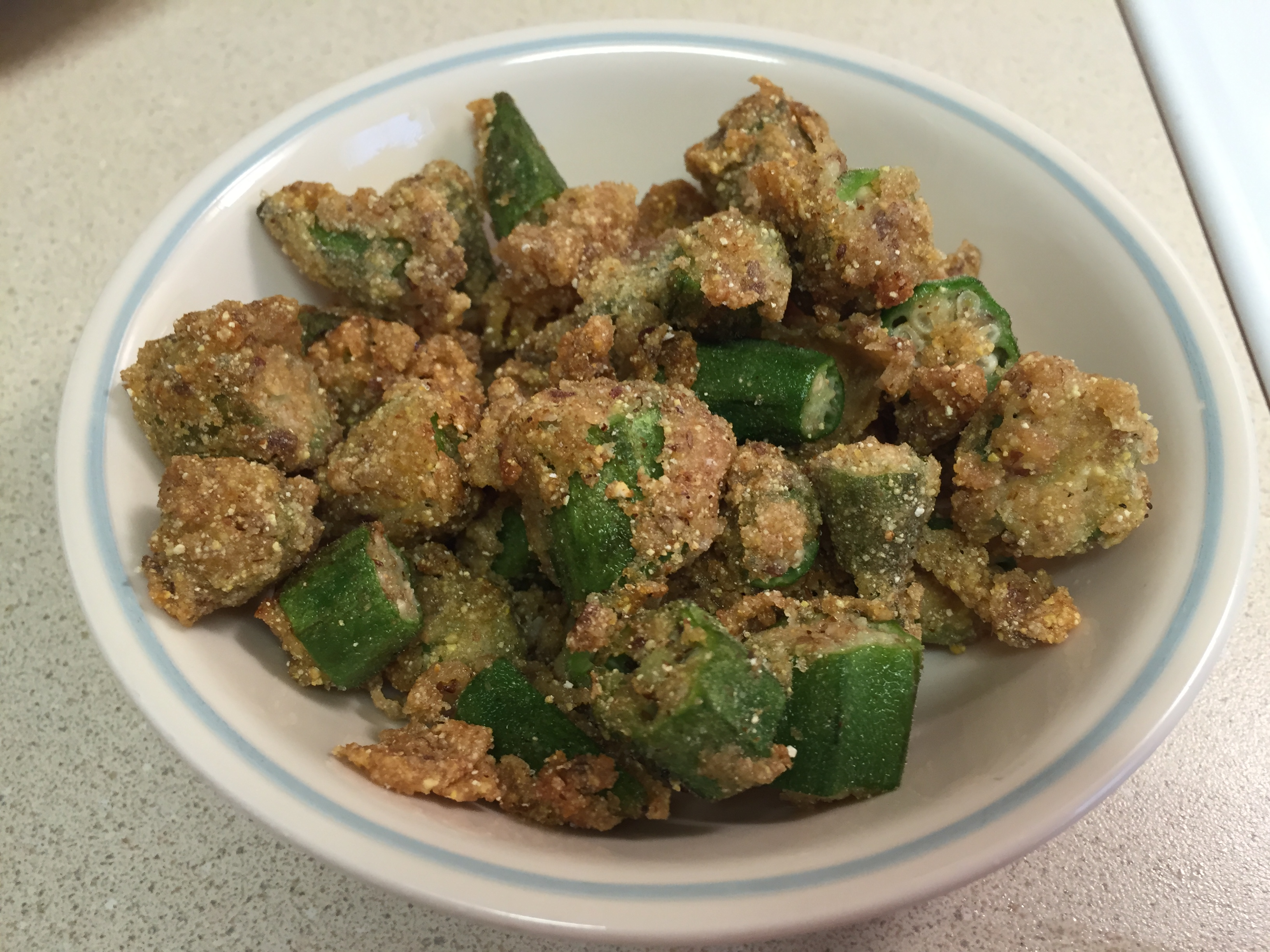
Fried okra

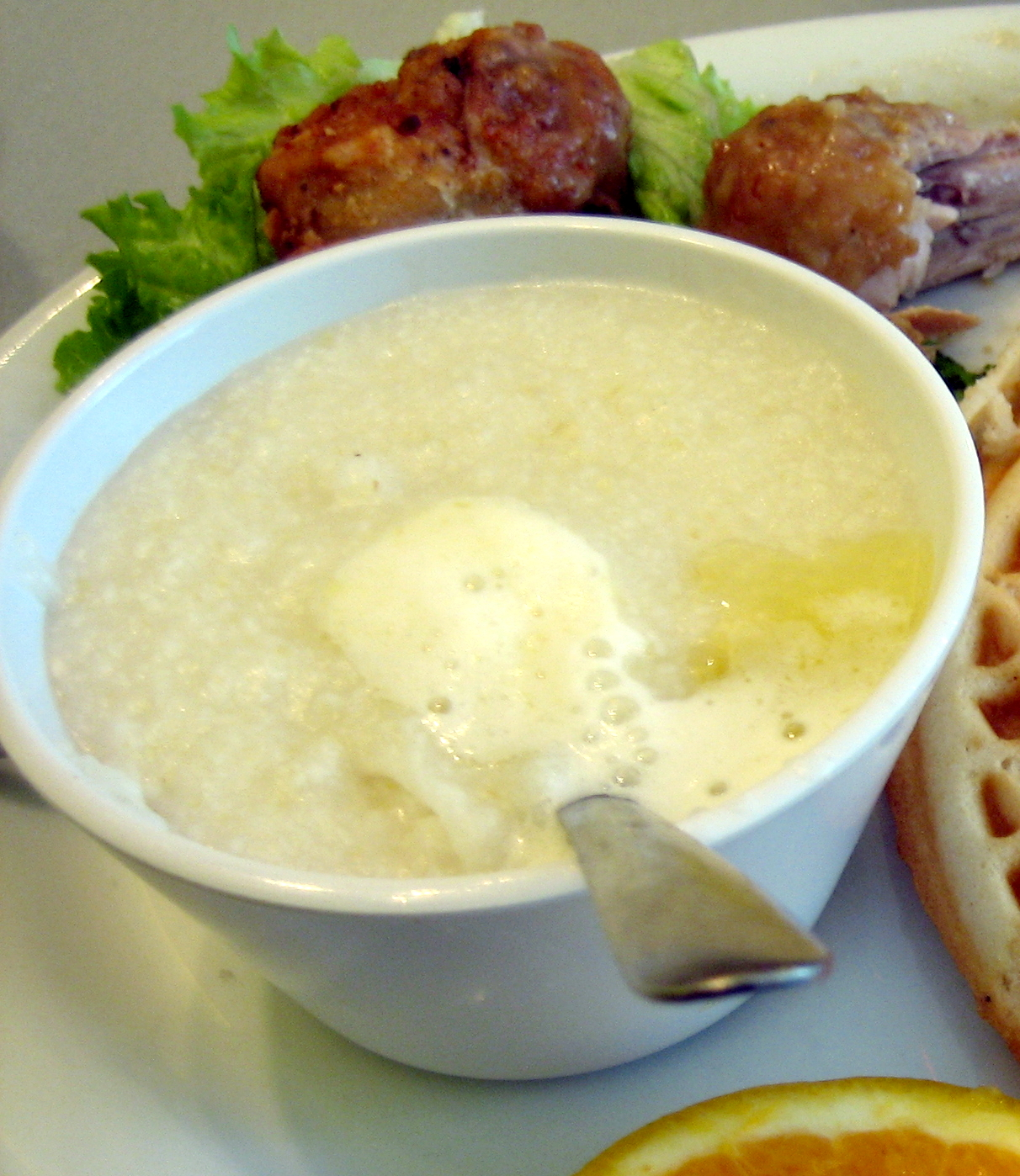
Grits

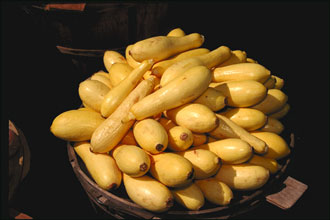
Squash

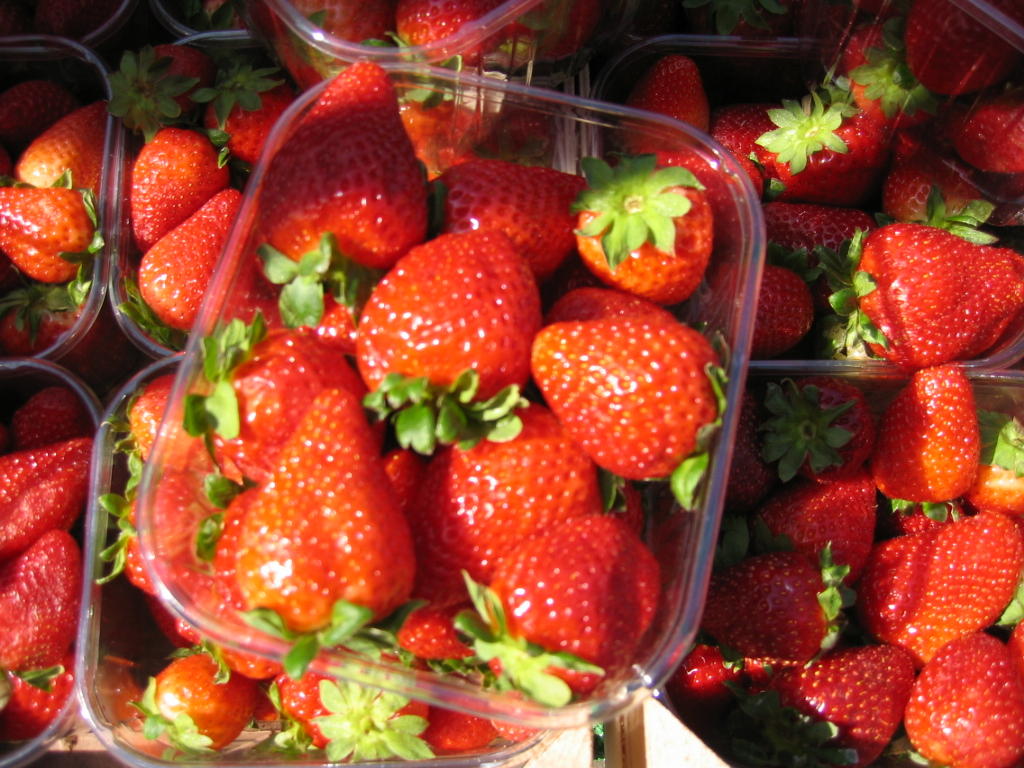
Strawberries

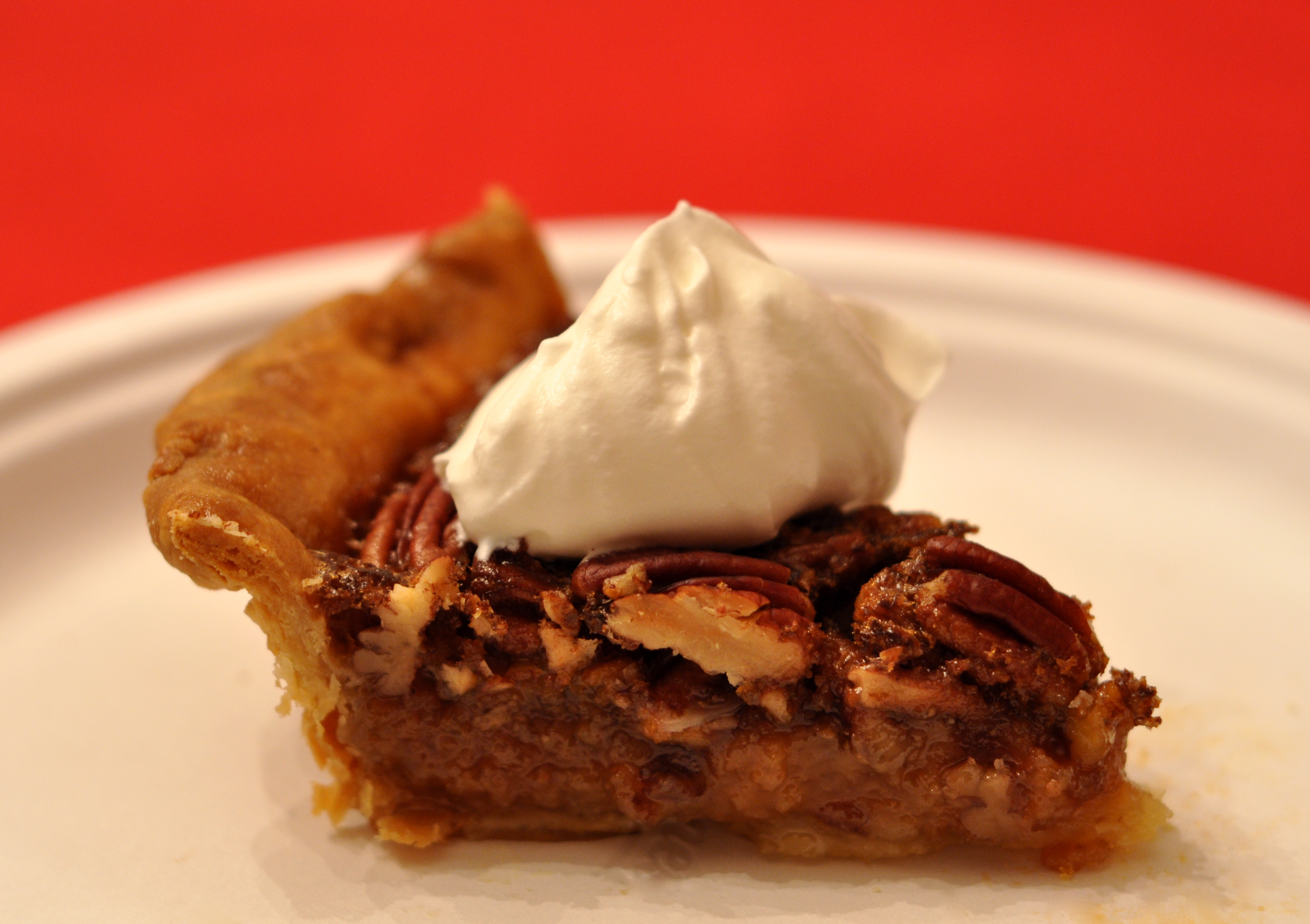
Pecan pie
