= Finger steaks =

Deep-fried steak strips

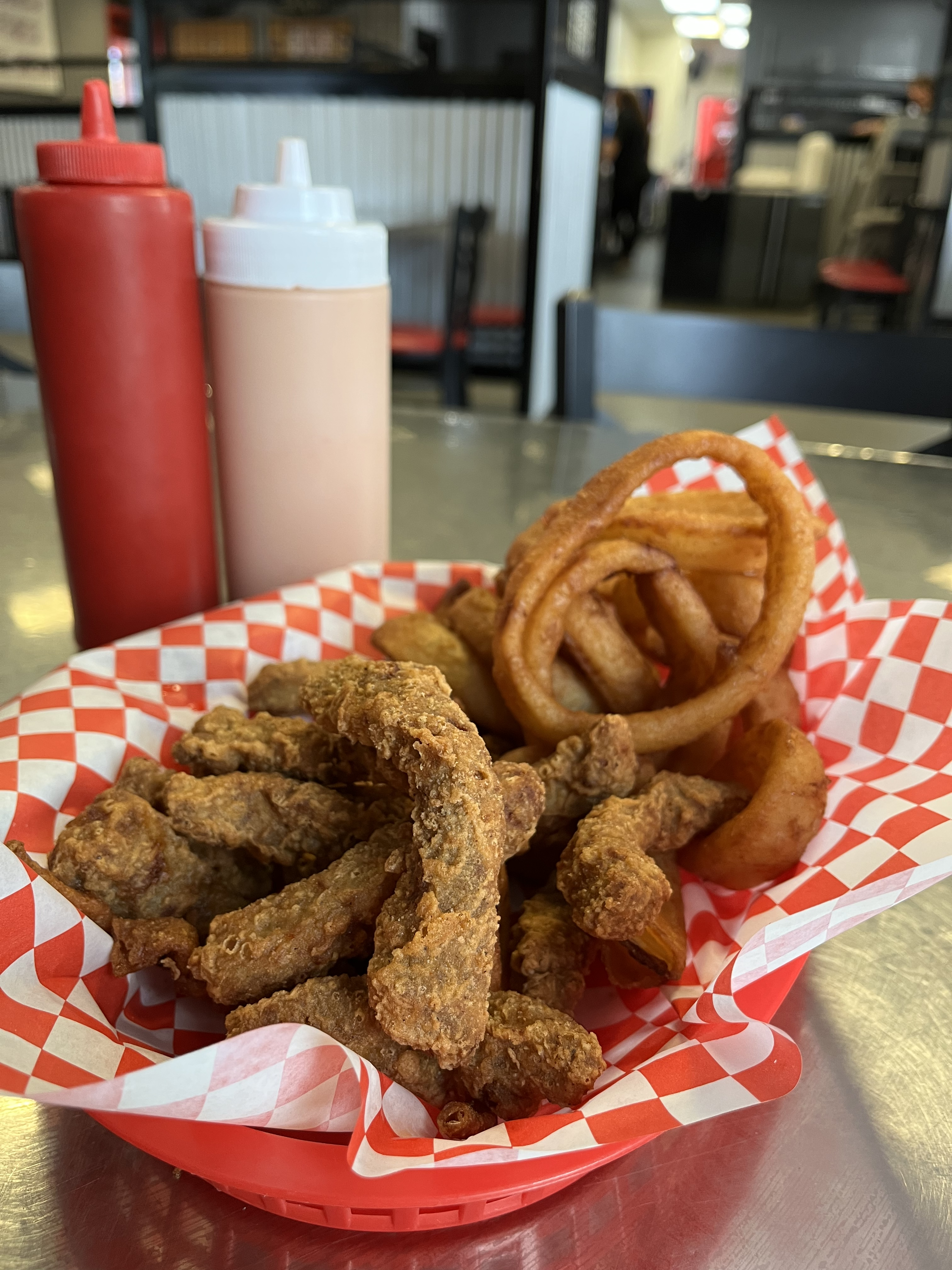
Finger steaks

Finger steaks are strips of steak (usually top sirloin), battered with a tempura-like or flour batter, and deep-fried in oil. They are typically served with French fries and a buttered piece of Texas toast. They are commonly found in restaurants and bars in the Pacific Northwest.

== History ==
Finger steaks are purported to have been first served in a restaurant setting at Boise, Idaho’s "Torch Lounge" (aka The Torch) in 1957. Milo Bybee claimed to have invented finger steaks while wondering what to do with leftover tenderloin scraps when he was working as a butcher for the U.S. Forest Service in McCall, Idaho. Bybee went to work as a chef at the Torch in 1946. According to a local lifestyle reporter, Milo's claim of inventing finger steaks is questioned. It may have been passed onto him by the original owners of The Torch, Floyd & Elnora (Shorty) Johnson. Opposing claims have been made that finger steaks were first created near Lewiston, Idaho during the log drives as a method of thoroughly cooking potentially spoiled beef while still remaining palatable. Either way, their origin is so closely tied to Idaho that one suggestion for the Idaho state quarter design was to "do something with the fact that Idaho is the home of finger steaks" submitted to the state arts commission on a napkin.

Finger steaks were produced as a frozen food by B and D Foods, which was founded in 1972 to supply its Signature Finger steak to a chain of fast food restaurants, the Red Steer, a now defunct chain of fast food burger joints in Idaho.

== See also ==
- Chicken fried steak
- List of deep fried foods
- Steak
- Beef
