= Veal Milanese =

Italian dish in Milanese Lombard cuisine

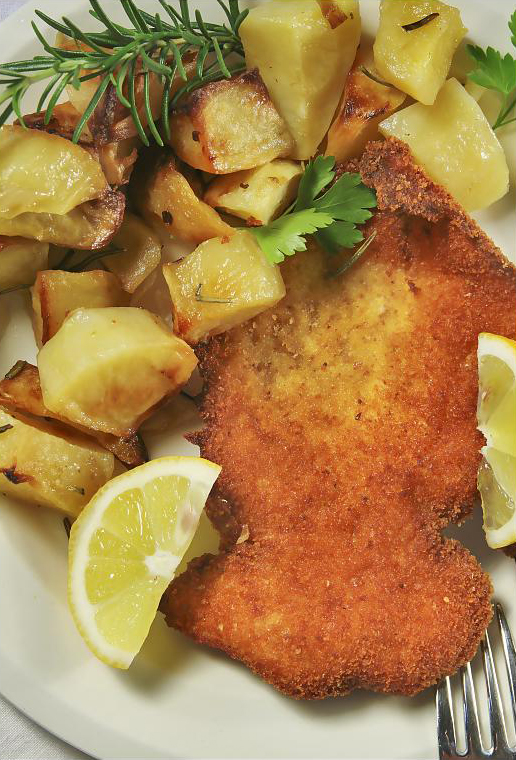
- Veal Milanese with potatoes
- Alternative names: Cotoletta alla milanese (Italian); Co(s)toletta a la milanesa (Lombard)
- Course: Secondo (Italian course)
- Place of origin: Italy
- Region or state: Milan, Lombardy
- Associated cuisine: Italian (Lombard)
- Main ingredients: Veal rib chop or sirloin bone-in
- Similar dishes: Cotoletta alla bolognese

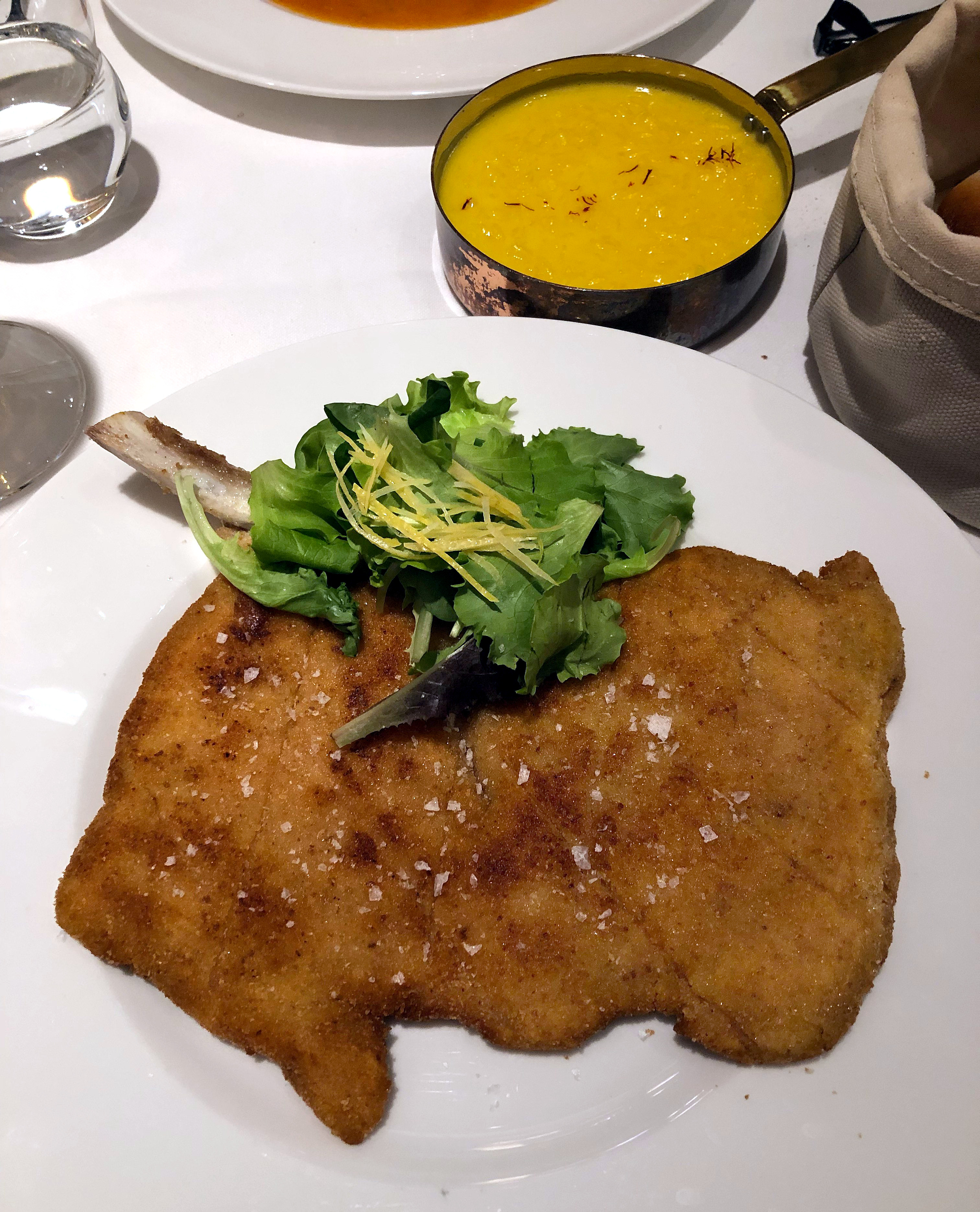
Veal Milanese with a side of risotto alla milanese

Veal Milanese (Italian: cotoletta alla milanese, pronounced [kotoˈletta alla milaˈneːze, -eːse]) (Note: Milanese: co(s)toletta a la milanesa, pronounced [ku(s)tuˈlɛta a la milaˈneːza]; from French côtelette. Due to its shape, it is often called oreggia d'elefant in Milanese or orecchia d'elefante in Italian, meaning 'elephant's ear'.) is a popular variety of cotoletta (veal cutlet preparation) from the city of Milan, Italy. It is traditionally prepared with a veal rib chop or sirloin bone-in and made into a breaded cutlet, fried in butter.

== History ==
In Milan, a dish called lumbolos cum panitio (lit. 'chops with bread') was served in 1134. It is mentioned at a banquet for the canons of the Basilica of Sant'Ambrogio in Milan. It is not known if the meat was covered in breadcrumbs or if it was served with bread as a side dish. Further evidence dates to around the 1st century BC indicating that the Romans enjoyed dishes of thinly sliced meat, which was breaded and fried. The dish resembles the Austrian dish Wiener schnitzel, which originated in Austria around the 19th century; according to some, the two dishes might be related—Milan was largely under Austrian rule from 1714, when the Treaty of Baden ceded the Duchy of Milan to the Austrian branch of the House of Habsburg, until until 1859, when the Lombardy won its independence from the Austrian Empire—although the history of neither is clear.

Various breaded meat dishes prepared in South America, particularly in Argentina, were inspired by the cotoletta alla milanese brought by Italian immigrants and are known as milanesa. A local variation of milanesa is called milanesa a la napolitana ('Neapolitan-style Milanese [cutlet]') and is made similar to veal Milanese with a preparation of cheese (mozzarella) and tomato.

== See also ==
Media related to Cotoletta alla milanese at Wikimedia Commons

- List of veal dishes
