= Cotoletta alla bolognese =

Italian meat dish

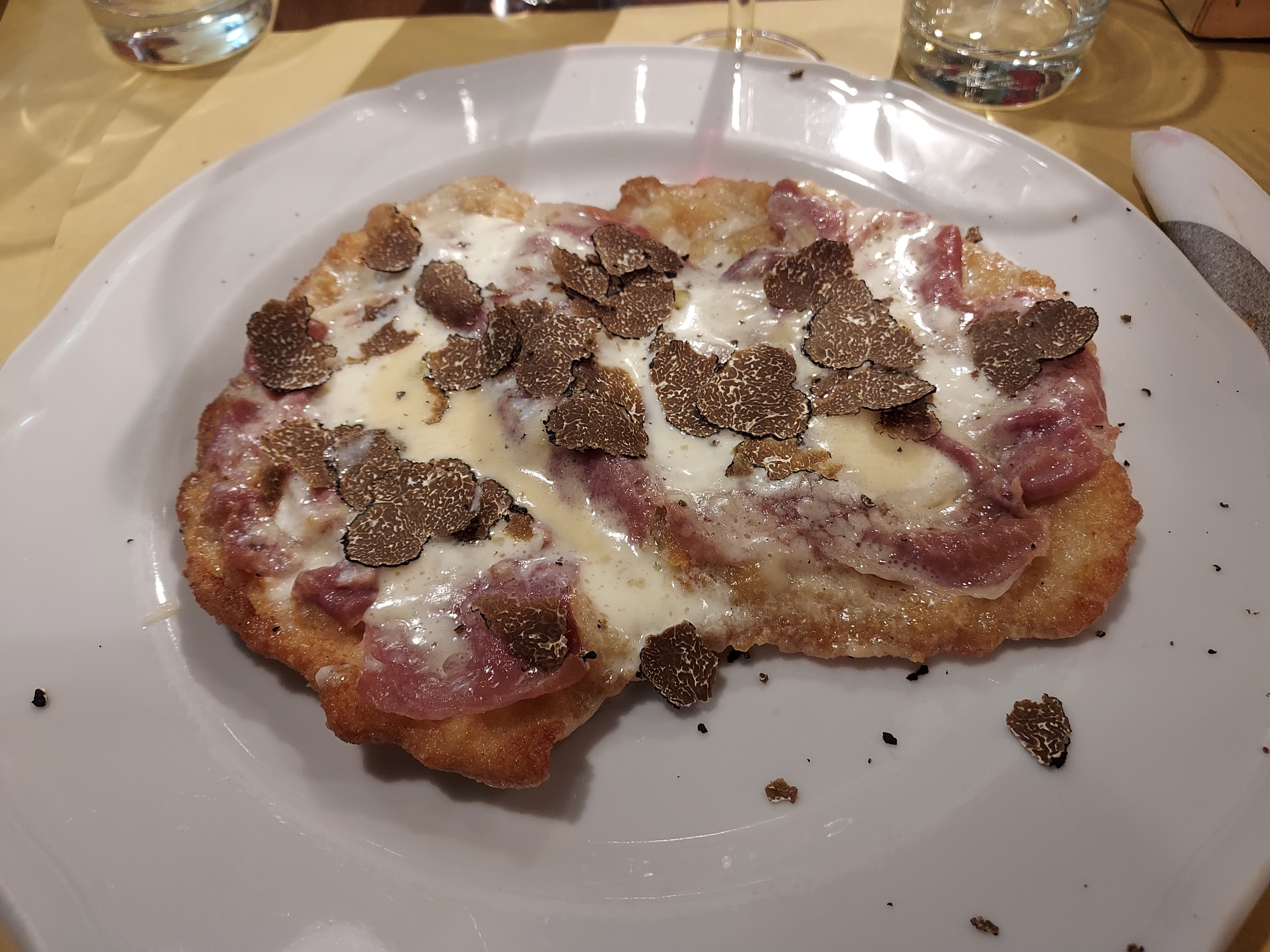
- Cotoletta alla bolognese with black truffle
- Alternative names: Petroniana
- Course: Secondo (Italian course)
- Place of origin: Italy
- Region or state: Bologna, Emilia-Romagna
- Associated cuisine: Italian (Emilian)
- Main ingredients: Veal, ham, Parmesan
- Ingredients generally used: Eggs, flour
- Variations: Truffles
- Similar dishes: Cotoletta alla milanese

Cotoletta alla bolognese (Italian: [kotoˈletta alla boloɲˈɲeːze, -eːse]; Bolognese: cutulàtta a la bulgnaiṡa) is a variety of cotoletta (veal cutlet preparation) from the city of Bologna, Italy. It is also known as petroniana, after Petronius, a fifth century bishop and the patron saint of Bologna.

The recipe was deposited at the Italian Academy of Cuisine at the Chamber of Commerce of Bologna on 14 October 2004.

== See also ==
- List of veal dishes
- Cotoletta
- Cotoletta alla milanese
- Wiener schnitzel
