= Don Woods (meteorologist) =

American television meteorologist (1928–2012)

Donald Kenneth Woods (February 5, 1928 – June 12, 2012) was an American meteorologist and cartoonist. He was the first television weatherman in Oklahoma to hold a degree in meteorology. He started his Oklahoma career in 1954 on KTUL, the ABC affiliate television station originally licensed to Muskogee and to Tulsa after 1957. He used a cartoon character called Gusty during his weather forecasts every night, drawing on-air, with a reference to recent weather as the focus of his simple line-drawn character.

Woods used Gusty to demonstrate how to be weather smart during thunderstorm and tornado activity. At various times, Gusty would also be drawn swimming, fishing, water skiing, or playing American football. Gusty was a responsible individual — raking leaves in the fall, mowing the grass in the summer, or sometimes just relaxing with a good book.

Every night during the weather forecast, Woods would announce a winner for that night's original Gusty. The Gusty drawings became one of the longest promotions for KTUL, lasting from the mid-1950s until Woods's retirement in 1989. Gusty drawings are installed in Tulsa's Gilcrease Museum and the Smithsonian Museum in Washington, D.C. The Gusty character also became a fixture at KTUL's sister station KATV in Little Rock, Arkansas, where beginning in 1972 Gusty was drawn by station weathermen Vic Shedler, Ron Sherman, Tom McBee, and Chuck Gaidica.

Woods's work was part of a 2010 exhibition on Oklahoma cartoonists at the Oklahoma History Center.

Woods has received numerous local, state, and national awards and recognitions. Woods taught at Tulsa Community College for a time. In April 2005, Gusty was named Oklahoma's state cartoon.

On June 12, 2012, Woods died of pancreatic cancer at the age of 84.
