= Cotoletta =

Italian word for a breaded veal cutlet

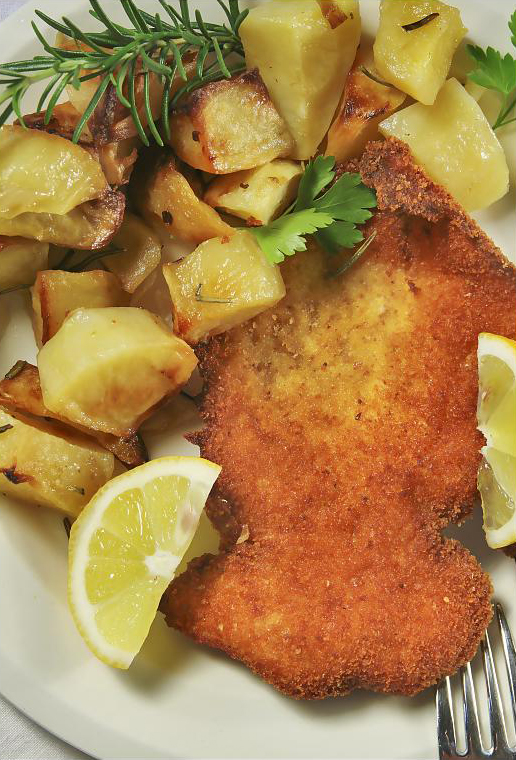
Cotoletta alla milanese with potatoes

Cotoletta (Italian: [kotoˈletta]) is an Italian form of breaded cutlet made from veal.

== Italy ==
=== Lombardy ===
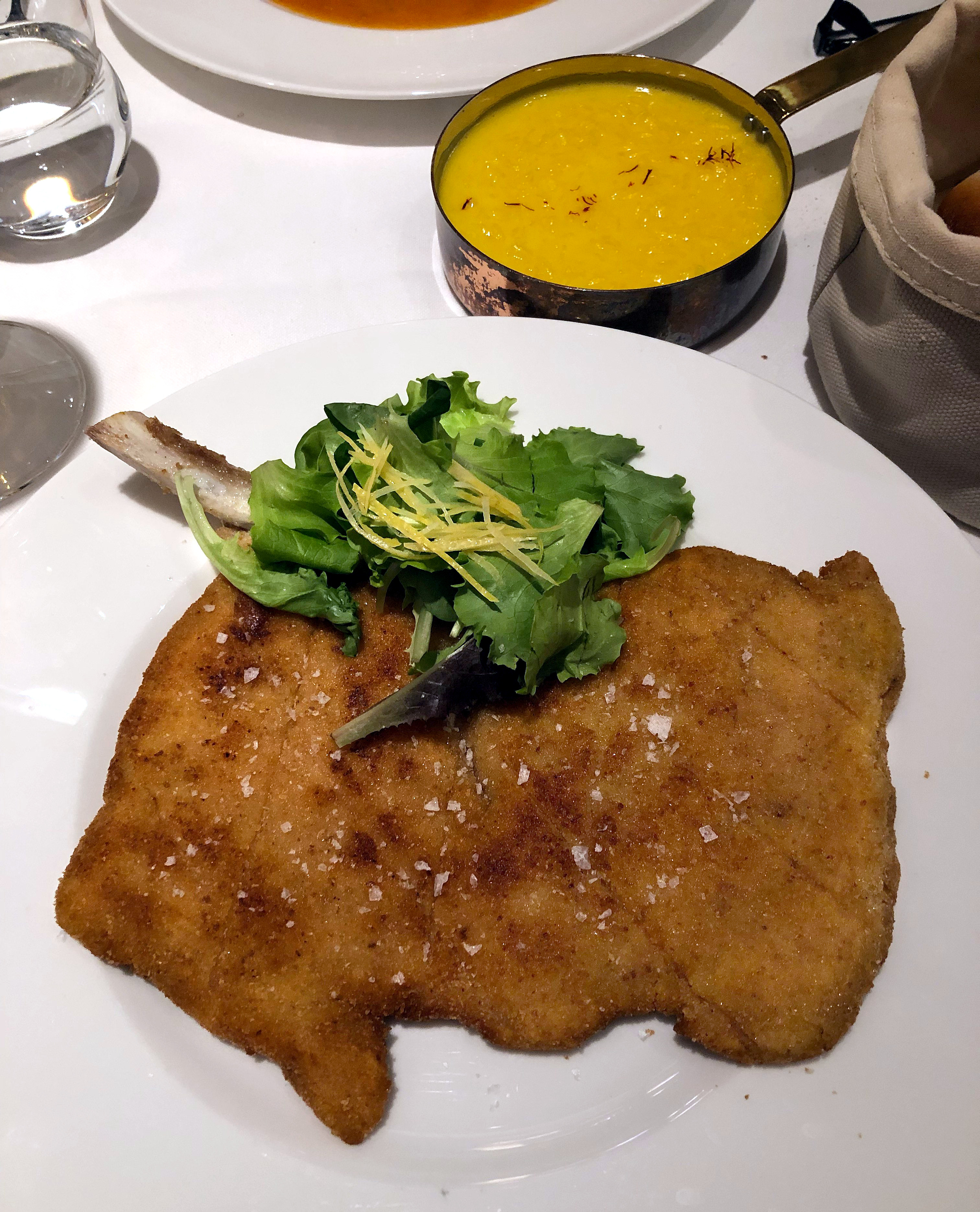
Vitello alla milanese with a side of risotto alla milanese

Cotoletta alla milanese (after its place of origin, Milan) is a fried veal breaded cutlet similar to Wiener schnitzel, but cooked with the bone in. It is traditionally fried in clarified butter. Due to its shape, it is often called oreggia d'elefant in Milanese or orecchia d'elefante in Italian, meaning 'elephant's ear'.

=== Emilia-Romagna ===
Cotoletta alla bolognese (after its place of origin, Bologna) is similar to a milanese, but melted Parmesan cheese and pieces of prosciutto are put overtop of the fried veal cutlet.

=== Sicily ===
Cotoletta alla palermitana (after its place of origin, Palermo) is similar to a milanese, but the veal is brushed with olive oil, and then baked or grilled instead of being fried. The breadcrumb is often mixed with parsley and pecorino cheese and, unlike the milanese cutlet, the palermitana cutlet does not have eggs in its breading.

== Argentina, Peru, and Uruguay ==
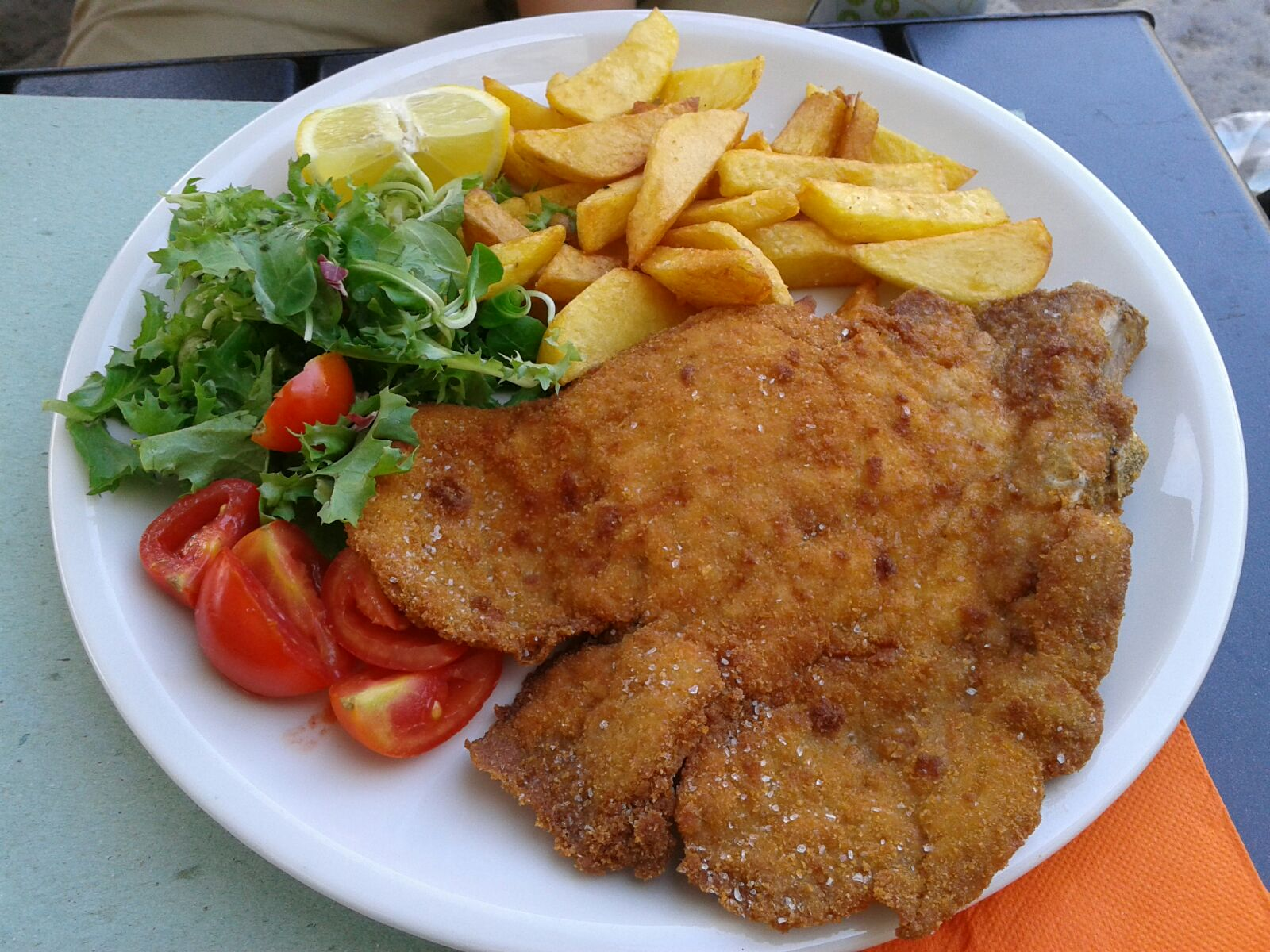
Milanesa

Various breaded meat dishes prepared in Argentina and Peru were inspired by the cotoletta alla milanese and are known as milanesa. In Argentina, Peru, and Uruguay, milanesa a la napolitana is made similar to the cotoletta with a preparation of cheese and tomato.

== See also ==
- List of veal dishes
