= Oklahoma Statehood Stamps =

American anniversary postage stamps

1957 Oklahoma Statehood Stamp
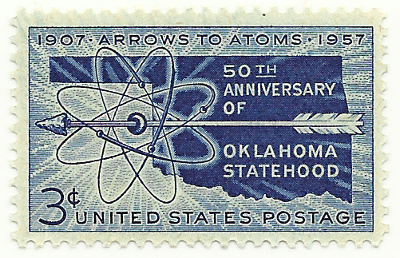
- 50th Anniversary of Oklahoma Statehood
- Country of production: United States
- Date of production: June 14, 1957
- Designer: William K. Schrage
- Engraver: M. D. Fenton
- Printer: Rotary
- Dimensions: 40 mm × 26 mm (1.6 in × 1.0 in)
- Perforation: 11x10½ – 200 Subject Electric Eye Plates
- Commemorates: November 16, 1907 – 50th Anniversary
- Depicts: Oklahoma Statehood – Arrows to Atoms
- No. in existence: 102,230,000
- Face value: 3¢
- Estimated value: 50¢

The Oklahoma Statehood Stamps were issued on June 14, 1957, and January 11, 2007, by the United States Postal Service. The U.S. postage stamps celebrate the 50th and 100th anniversaries of statehood being granted to the state of Oklahoma by the United States of America. Oklahoma was the 46th state to be granted statehood on November 16, 1907.

== 1957 issue ==
A single three-cent stamp was issued by the United States Post Office Department on June 14, 1957, to commemorate the 50th anniversary of Oklahoma's admission into the United States. The stamp's primary color is deep ultramarine and it has a graphic depicting an arrow piercing an atomic symbol.

== Centenary stamp ==
The 100th anniversary stamp features a colorful depiction of an Oklahoma sunrise from beyond a river flowing through a valley of high plains terrain. Renowned artist Mike Larsen, of Chickasaw ancestry, captures this tranquil Oklahoma scene. The stamp pays homage to 1943 hit Broadway musical Oklahoma! by Richard Rodgers and Oscar Hammerstein II with the caption, "Oh, what a beautiful mornin'…" The musical's signature song doubles as Oklahoma's state song.

This stamp is part of a series which seek to commemorate the entry of new states into the Union; the USPS has also announced the sale of commemorative stamps for Alaska (stamps went on sale on January 9, 2009), Oregon (January 14, 2009) and Hawaii (summer 2009).

== See also ==
- Oklahoma
- Oklahoma!
- Rodgers and Hammerstein
- United States Postal Service
- Postage stamp
- First day of issue
- List of Oklahoma state symbols

== Bibliography ==
- Stanley Gibbons Postage Stamp Catalogue – United States (various ed.). London: Stanley Gibbons Ltd.
