= Milanesa sandwich =

South American sandwich

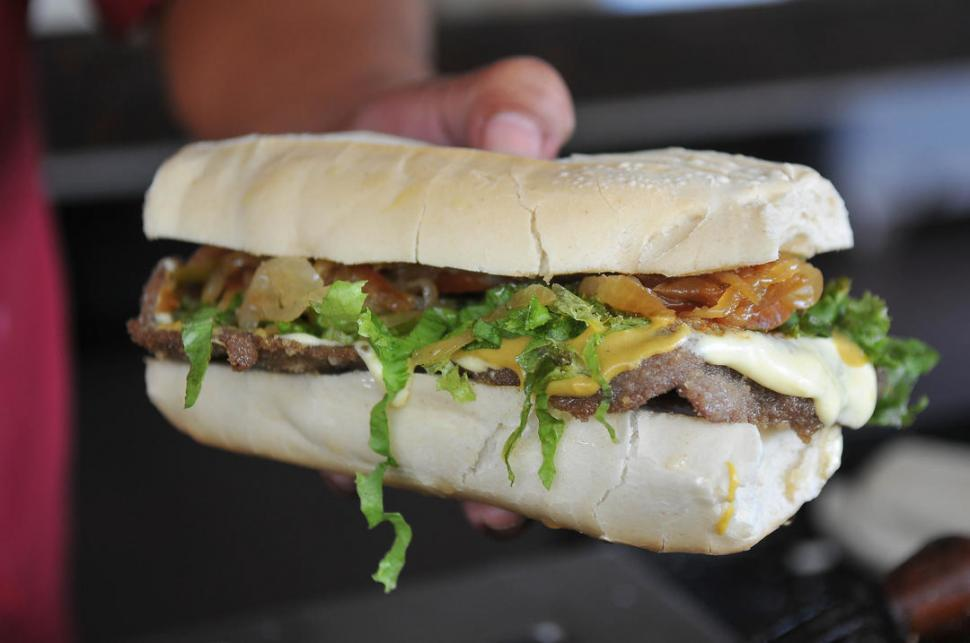
Sándwich de milanesa from Tucumán

The milanesa sandwich ("Sánguche de milanesa" in Argentina and "Milanesa al pan" in Uruguay) is a type of sandwich eaten in the Río de la Plata region in South America. The bread is usually a white baton or short baguette type, cut in half and filled with a large (beef) schnitzel, "milanesa" being the name schnitzels have in the region, plus sliced tomato, lettuce. It might also include other ingredients, such as sliced onions, ham, cheese and egg (sliced boiled egg, or fried). The "milanesa de pollo" variant replaces the beef schnitzel with breaded poultry. "Milanesa de pollo" is the same as a chicken escalope sandwich in Britain.

== Variations ==
In the province of Tucumán, Argentina, it enjoys great popularity. This sandwich is called "sánguche de milanesa" or "milanga" in Tucumán, and is sold in "sangucherías" and food carts. Sangucherías are a type of fast food restaurant that sells milanesa sandwiches, along with other types of sandwich such as "lomito"(which is almost identical to the Milanesa sandwich, but replaces the milanesa with a thin rib steak fillet, hence the name "lomito", which is the name of that cut in Spanish). Sangucherías do not usually form fast food chains, although there are a few exceptions. They are mostly family owned. The main difference between this variety of the sandwich and others prepared in the country is that it is always eaten warm. The sandwich is prepared in the presence of its consumer, who can oversee its preparation. The lettuce is always shredded in small bits, and the addition of onions (cooked or raw, soaked in vinegar) and ají (hot chili pepper sauce) is usually encouraged. The bread used is soft but usually toasted for a few seconds before being eaten, making it a bit crunchy in the outside. The milanesas are always fried, and might be accompanied with ham, cheese and fried eggs for a higher price.

So big is the popularity of these sandwiches in San Miguel de Tucumán, that a monument to this food was built in 2013, by local artist Sandro Pereira. Sandwicherías have been the main competitors to foreign fast food chains such as McDonald's, Burger King or Subway in Tucumán, with some of them selling as much as 500 sandwiches per night. There is also an annual "Expo Milanga", which is celebrated every 18 March, commemorating the death of José "Chacho" Leguizamón, founder of one of the most traditional sandwicherías in the city.

== See also ==
- List of sandwiches
