= Loin chop =

Commercial cut of pork or lamb

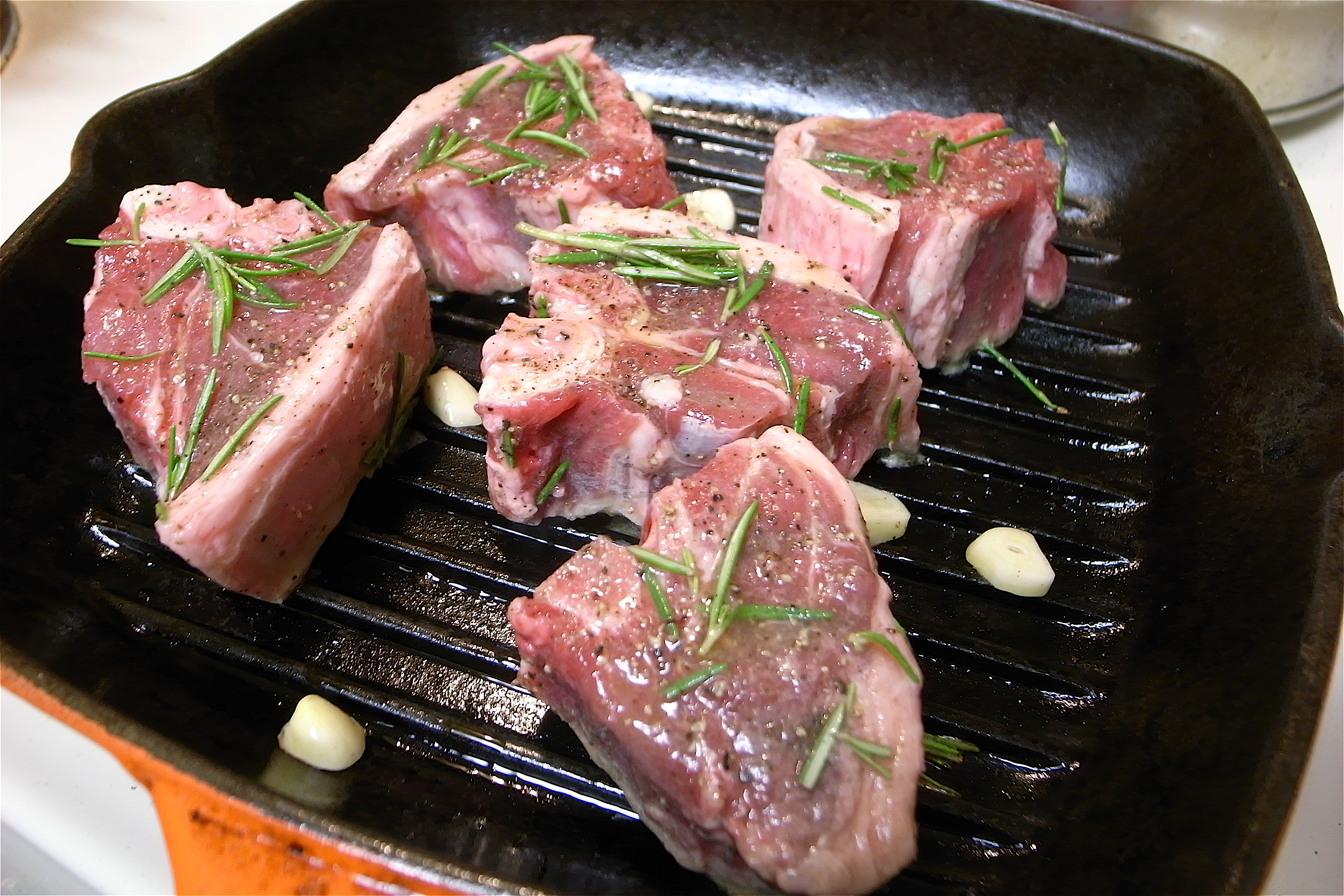
Lamb loin chops on the grill

Loin chops can refer to either a commercial cut of pork, or lamb.

== Pork ==
Pork loin chops are cut from the back of the pig. Many grilling websites refer to them as "porterhouse" or "T-bone" pork chops. They look like a T-bone steak from a cow, and they contain two muscles, the loin and tenderloin. Since they cook so differently, cooking them by very fast methods is not recommended.

== Lamb ==
Unlike pork loin chops, lamb loin chops contain almost one muscle. They are bigger than rib chops, and the biggest lamb chop that does not have bands of connective tissue separating the meat. They do very well with hot, fast, dry methods of cooking, such as grilling or broiling.
