= Rib chop =

Cut of meat

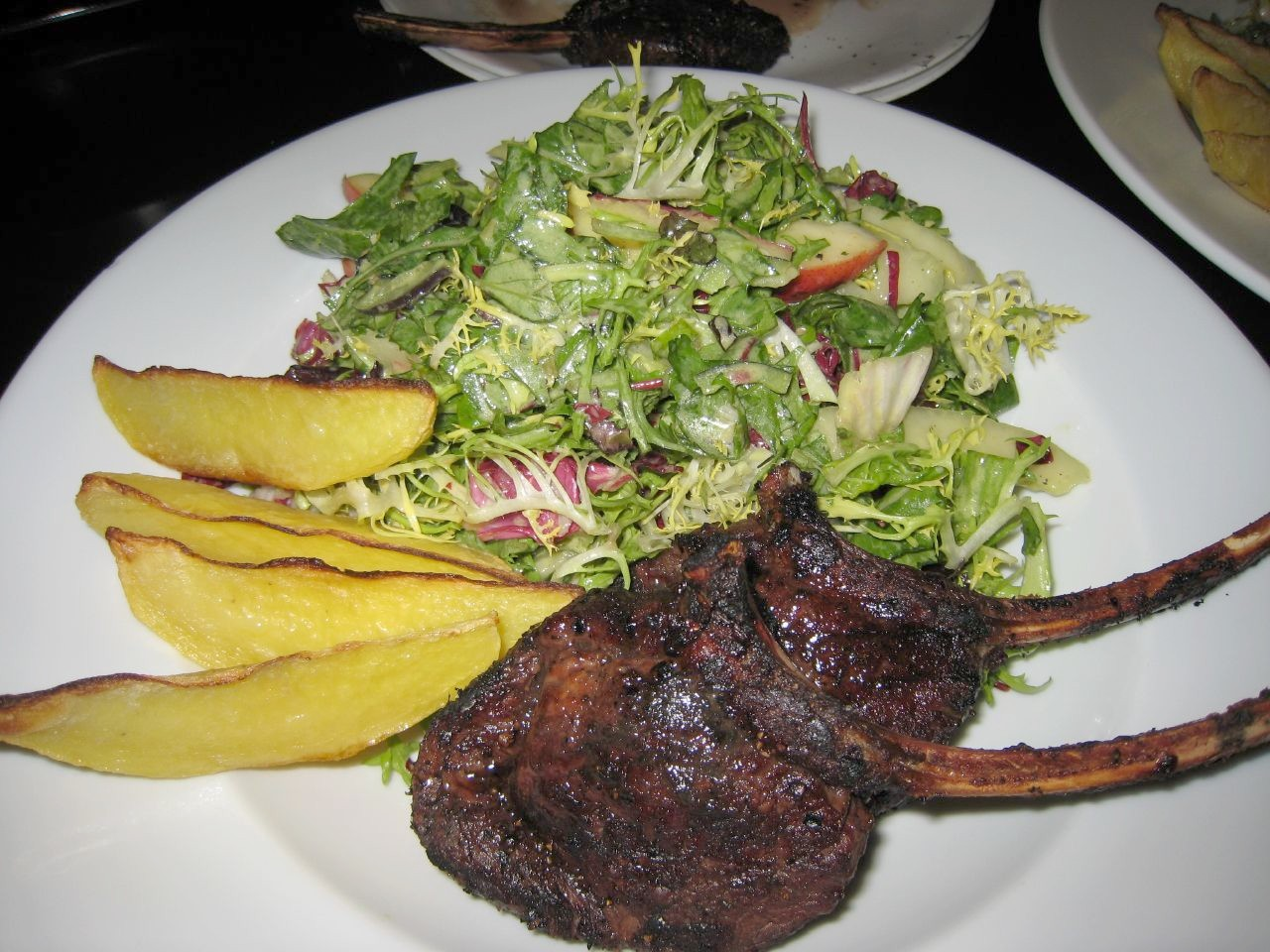
Grilled elk rib chops

A rib chop, or rib end cut, is a cut of meat that comes from the rib section of an animal. The term is usually used for pork and lamb. Rib chops are considered the ribeye of pork and lamb.

== Pork ==
Rib pork chops are cut from the rib section of the loin, or the back of the pig. They generally have a bone running down one side, enclosing a large eye of loin muscle. The rib chop has a thin layer of fat around the outside, and the chop itself has a high fat content. Blade bone rib chops contain more fats and connective tissue than those from the shoulder end. Most boneless pork chops are taken from the rib chop.

Since rib chops of pork are center cut, they contain little connective tissue, which makes them good for fast, dry heat methods, such as grilling and broiling. Unlike the loin chop, a rib chop is almost one muscle, which makes it cook more evenly.

== Lamb ==
Rib chops of lamb contain more fat than loin chops. If the whole primal cut is left intact, the cut is instead a rack of lamb. Like pork rib chops, they have little connective tissue, so they are usually roasted as a rack, or grilled one by one. They may also be frenched, with the meat and fat cut off the bone.

== See also ==
- Meat chop
