= Milanesa =

Argentine originated South American breaded cutlet dish

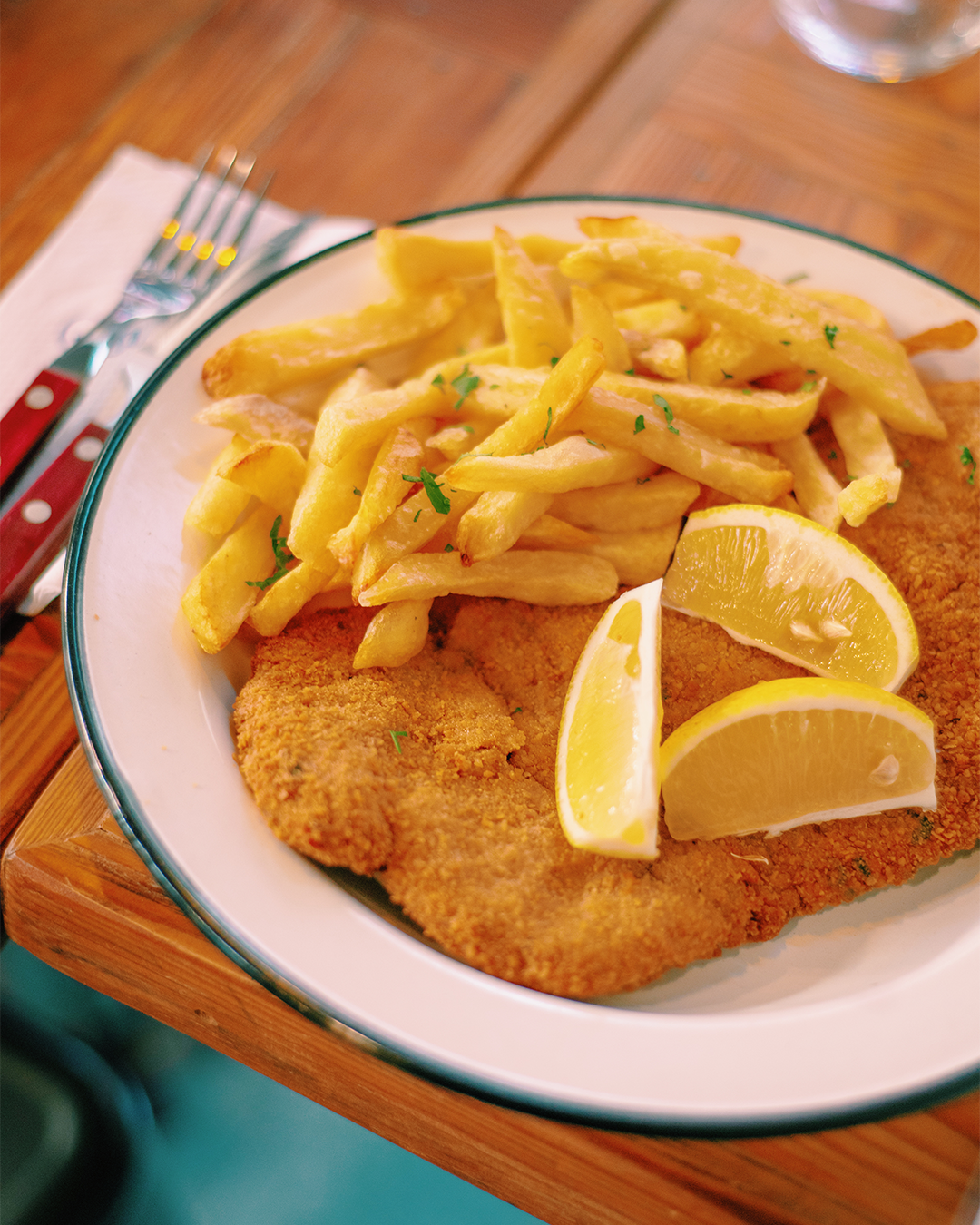
- A typical Argentine milanesa, served with french fries and lemon slices.
- Type: Breaded cutlet
- Region or state: Latin America
- Associated cuisine: Latin American cuisine, especially that of Argentina
- Main ingredients: A steak of beef, chicken, pork, fish, eggplant or legumes, coated with eggs, parsley and breadcrumbs
- Variations: Milanesa napolitana (topped with tomato sauce, ham and melted cheese), milanesa sandwich (sánguche de milanesa)
- Similar dishes: Cotoletta alla milanese, Wiener schnitzel

Milanesa (Spanish for "Milanese") is a form of breaded cutlet that is mainly associated with the Southern Cone and the Río de la Plata region. Although known throughout Latin American cuisine, it is closely tied to the cuisine of Argentina, where it is considered a quintessential national dish and a cultural mainstay. Milanesa is a derivative of cotoletta alla milanese, an Italian dish typical of the city of Milan in which a bone-in rib of veal is used, which is breaded and fried in clarified butter. The original recipe disseminated to other nations via the Italian diaspora, which in Argentina constituted the largest immigrant community in the country as part of a massive wave of European immigration from the late 19th century to the early 20th century. Argentine milanesas are typically made with lean, boneless cuts of beef, although chicken, pork and fish milanesas are also common, as well as vegetarian varieties such as eggplant or legumes like soy beans and chickpeas.

It is estimated that Argentines consume milanesas an average of three times weekly, totaling 300 million kilograms annually, equivalent to a per capita consumption of 11.4 kilograms (25 lb) per year. A popular variation originating in Buenos Aires is the milanesa napolitana (Neapolitan), which is topped with tomato sauce, ham and melted cheese, and, according to popular belief, was invented in the 1940s when a cook sought to conceal a burnt milanesa. Milanesas are also commonly served in a sandwich (sánguche de milanesa), a preparation that has become emblematic in the province of Tucumán, where it has been officially recognized as part of the province's cultural heritage. Since 2011, milanesa has been celebrated annually in Argentina on 3 May as "National Milanesa Day", an observance that originated as a social media initiative.

== History ==
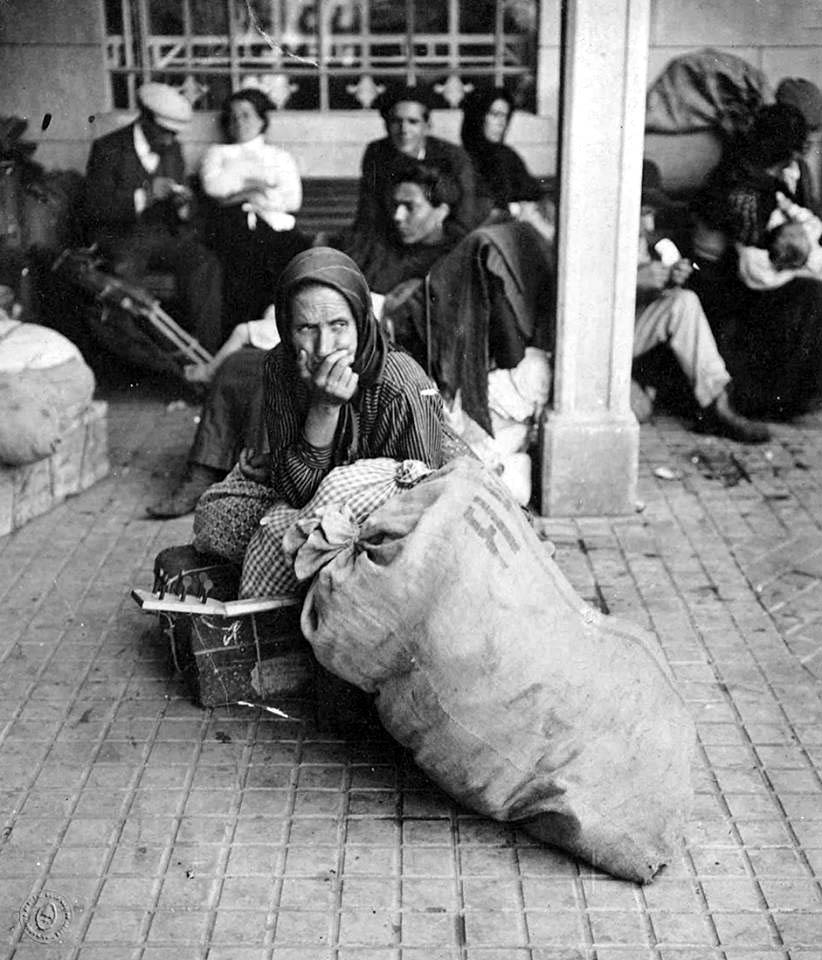
Migrant workers at the Hotel de Inmigrantes, c. 1910, during the great European immigration wave to Argentina.

The historical origins of the milanesa (meaning "Milanese" in Spanish) are surrounded by debate, and as with many traditional dishes, its nationality is contested between Milan and Vienna. Italian tradition holds that the Wiener schnitzel derives from the costoletta alla milanese, supposedly introduced to Vienna by Field Marshal Josef Radetzky during his posting in Italy between 1831 and 1857, though no documentary evidence of such transmission has been found. Conversely, the Viennese theory maintains that the direction of influence was the reverse: that Milanese cooks learned of the breaded cutlet when their city belonged to the Austrian Empire during the 18th and 19th centuries. In any case, the idea of coating meat in breadcrumbs and frying it seems to be far older and more widespread. Pietro Verri, the 18th-century Italian writer and journalist, noted in his History of Milan that medieval manuscripts described meals combining meat and bread, although it remains unclear whether the bread was grated or served on the side. Among the earliest records is the menu for a banquet held in 1134 for the feast of Saint Satyrus, which listed lombos cum panitio, or breaded loin of meat. As noted by Giovanni Fancello, a member of the Italian Association of Historical Gastronomy, breading was already a common culinary procedure in medieval cuisine, and the costoletta has effectively "always been eaten". The controversy extends beyond Italy and Austria, as some historians suggest that the recipe may actually have French roots. Alessandro Marzo Magno, citing Massimo Alberini, points out that the 1749 edition of the French treatise La science du maître d'hôtel (The Science of the Steward) contained a recipe for breaded and fried cutlets, later transmitted to Milan under the name cotolette de la Révolution Française (the French Revolution cotolette). Today, the terms costoletta and cotoletta are used interchangeably in Milan, and the costoletta alla milanese is formally recognized as a prodotto agroalimentare tradizionale under the city's "Municipal Denominations of Origin", alongside risotto alla milanese and panettone.

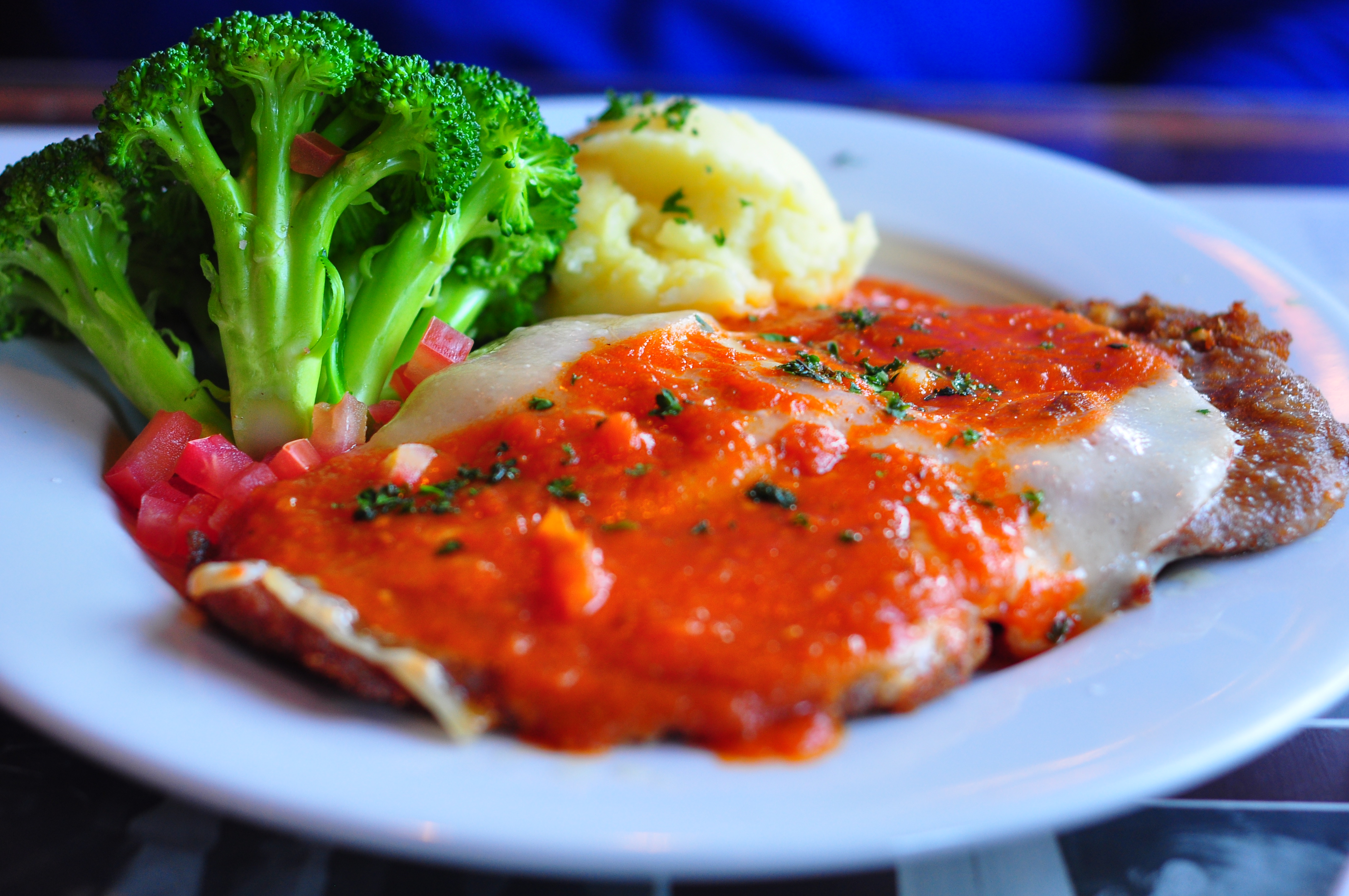
An iconic dish of Buenos Aires, milanesa napolitana is topped with tomato sauce, ham and melted cheese.

When the dish reached the Americas, the term "milanesa" itself signaled an origin in Milan, and it is widely believed to derive directly from the cotoletta alla milanese owing to their close similarities. The milanesa of the Río de la Plata region is widely regarded as a culinary legacy of Italian immigration, most likely originating with migrants from Lombardy. The recipe became particularly popular in Argentina, which experienced a massive wave of European immigration between the late 19th and early 20th centuries that profoundly reshaped the country's demographic composition. Contrary to the expectations of the ruling elites, most newcomers settled in the capital, transforming Buenos Aires into the largest and most populous city in Latin America at the time. The city's population rose from approximately 180,000 in 1870 to 1,300,000 by 1910 and Buenos Aires became predominantly immigrant in composition. Around 3 million Italians arrived at the port of Buenos Aires between 1870 and 1920, which represents almost two-thirds of the total immigration of the period. As a result, Italian immigration radically altered Argentine culture, especially that of the city, and its influence can be found in aspects such as its dialect or its cuisine. The history of milanesa consumption in the country can be traced through its inclusion in cookbooks, which indicate that "milanesa" was originally used as an adjective denoting a method of preparation before gradually evolving into a noun referring to the dish itself. The term first appeared in the eighth edition of Francisco Figueredo's El libro de cocina, published in 1914—whose first edition has not been located—which includes two recipes describing veal ribs and cutlets prepared "a la milanesa". A classic variation of the dish is the milanesa napolitana (Neapolitan), topped with tomato sauce, ham and melted cheese, which, according to popular legend, originated in Buenos Aires in the 1940s when a cook tried to cover up a burnt milanesa.

== Society and culture ==
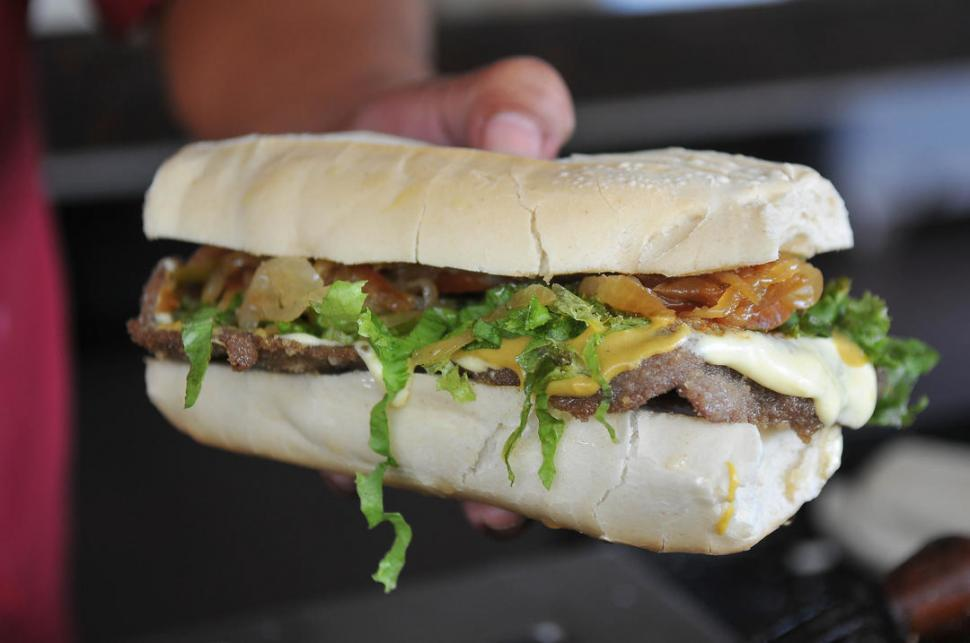
A typical Tucumán-style milanesa sandwich (sánguche de milanesa), which has been officially designated as part of the province's cultural heritage.

Milanesa is known throughout Latin America, but it is particularly associated with the Southern Cone and the Río de la Plata. Despite its foreign origins, it is broadly regarded as a national dish in Argentina, where it is widely popular and considered an iconic staple of the country's cuisine. It is estimated that approximately 300 million kilograms of milanesas are consumed in Argentina each year, representing an annual per capita consumption of 11.4 kilograms (25 lb). In addition, Argentines eat milanesas an estimated three times a week on average. In Argentina, the widely used expression "la verdad de la milanesa" (lit. 'the truth of milanesa') denotes an unquestionable truth and is commonly believed to originate from longstanding debates over the dish's origins. Since 2011, the country celebrates "National Milanesa Day" on May 3, following an informal initiative launched by fans of the dish on social media. Since 2024, the Hipódromo de Palermo in Buenos Aires has hosted an annual festival dedicated to milanesa.

A popular way of eating milanesas is as a sandwich (sánguche de milanesa), which is particularly associated with the Argentine province of Tucumán, where it has become a local specialty. Every March 18, the "Milanesa Sandwich Day" is celebrated, an initiative that began in Tucumán in 2013 and has since spread to the rest of the country. The date commemorates the death of José Norberto "Chacho" Leguizamón in 2010, who was the driving force behind one of Tucumán's most iconic sandwich shops, helping elevate the breaded cutlet sandwich to cult status and attracting both locals and tourists. In 2024, the Tucumán legislature designated the milanesa sandwich as an official "intangible cultural heritage" of the province, highlighting its significance for tourism. Since 2022, the "National Milanesa Sandwich Festival" has been held every November in the provincial capital, San Miguel de Tucumán, attracting thousands of attendees.

== See also ==
- List of Argentine dishes
