= Fried okra =

Type of food

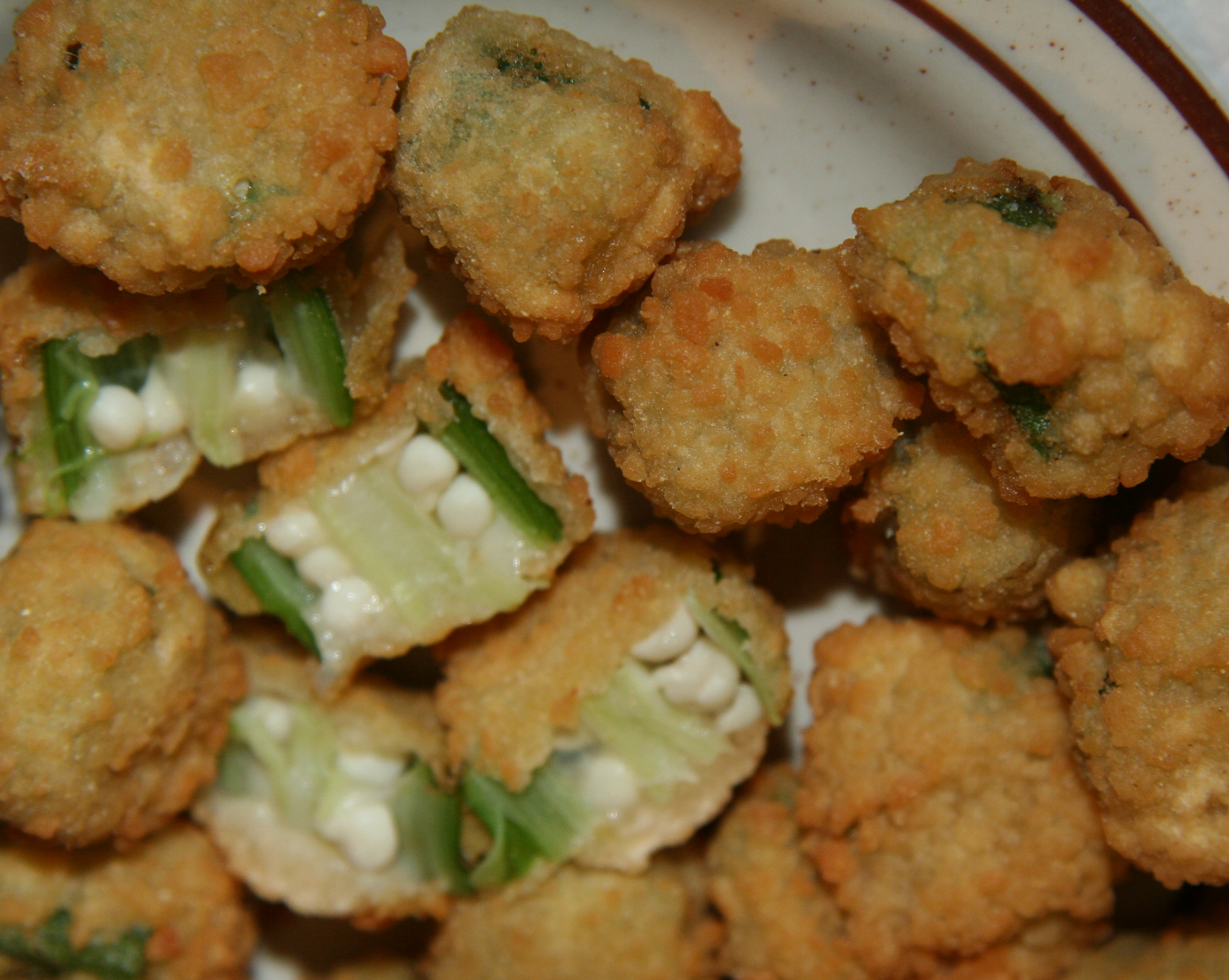
- Fried okra, showing the interior and exterior
- Type: Fried vegetable
- Course: Side dish
- Region or state: Southern United States
- Associated cuisine: Soul food, cuisine of the Southern United States
- Main ingredients: Okra
- Ingredients generally used: Cornmeal

Fried okra is a side dish associated with the cuisine of the Southern United States, particularly soul food. It is made by coating sliced okra in cornmeal and then frying it.

== History ==
Okra is a staple of the cuisine of the Southern United States, with fried okra being the most popular method of preparation. Okra was first transported to the Americas by slave ships during the Atlantic slave trade. The method of frying okra is believed to have roots in the Congo or West Africa before being transported to the United States. During the mid-19th century, fried vegetables and fritters became increasingly popular in the South which contributed to the popularity of fried okra.

Fried okra is popularly served at barbecues and restaurants in the South, especially as part of a meat and three. It is often consumed during the summer, when okra is in season. It has been called "Southern popcorn". The dish is associated with soul food, Cajun and Gullah Geechee cuisine. It is included in the Oklahoma state meal, a menu based on the agricultural and culinary history of Oklahoma that is an official state symbol.

== Preparation ==
The basic preparation of fried okra is simple, requiring okra that has been dredged in cornmeal and fried. The okra pods are cut into slices and then tossed or dredged in cornmeal before frying in butter or vegetable oil. Either deep frying and pan frying may be used. More complex recipes involve dipping the okra in eggs or buttermilk prior to dredging in cornmeal or cornmeal and flour. Another method of preparation calls for a cornmeal batter that includes beaten eggs. This batter may be seasoned with ingredients such as black pepper and cayenne pepper.

Okra can become slimy when sliced. Cutting the okra into small pieces before frying allows it to maintain a crispier exterior texture, but results in a slimier interior. Whole okra pods may also be fried.

It is typically served as a side dish, sometimes with a dipping sauce such as remoulade.
