= Ragout fin =

German entrée dish

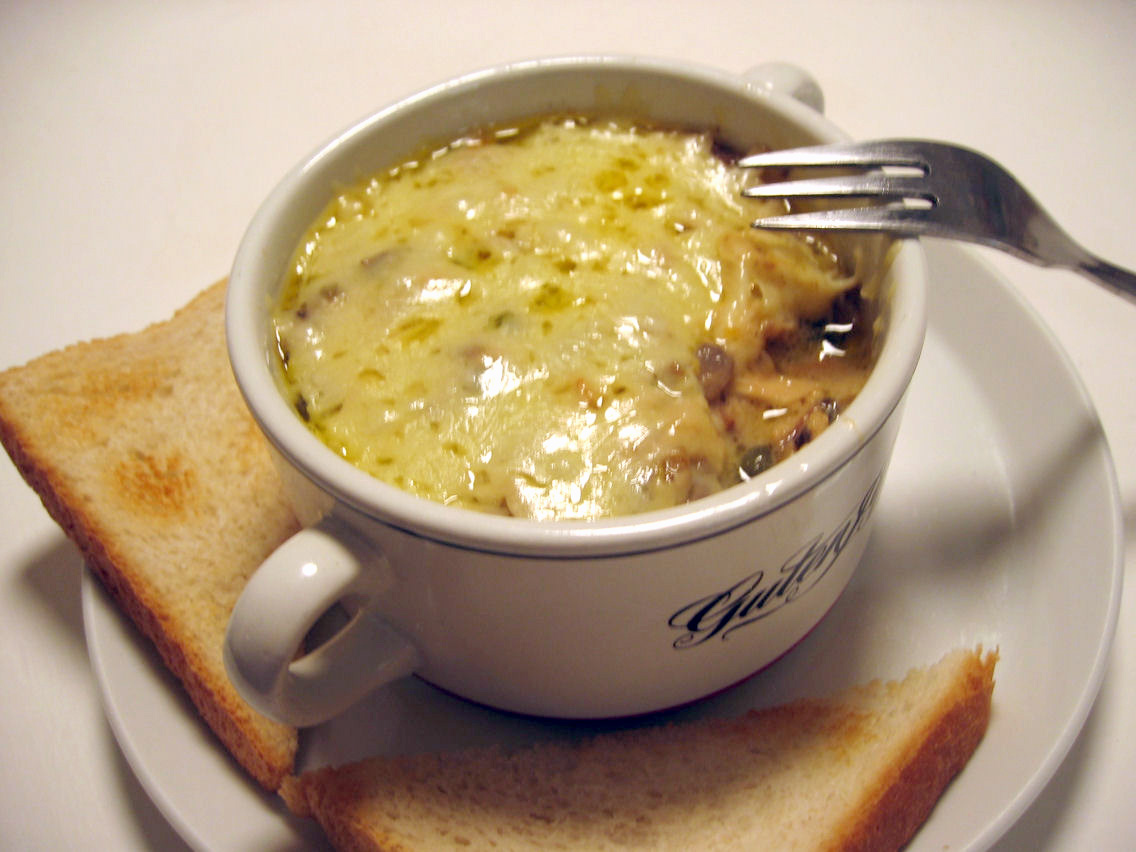
- Type: Soup
- Course: Entrée
- Place of origin: Germany/Berlin
- Main ingredients: Veal, sweetbread, calf brain, tongue, bone marrow, chicken breast, fish; vinegar stock or butter; roux, button mushrooms, egg yolks

Ragout fin (French for fine ragout) is a time-consuming entrée. Its origin in France is not confirmed, and it appears to have been created by Huguenot immigrants in Berlin. A similar dish is in East Germany known as Würzfleisch, which uses pork or chicken instead of veal.

The main essence of Ragout fin consists of veal, sweetbread, calf brain, tongue and bone marrow, chicken breast and fish, everything boiled either in a vinegar stock or diced and stewed in butter. The second part is Roux, mixed with stewed button mushrooms and thickened with egg yolk.

Dice and sauce are mixed, heated in water and finally scalloped with Parmesan and butter. Some Worcestershire Sauce is usually added.

Today, Ragout fin is most likely to be found canned, being prepared significantly differently from the original recipe. As substitute for veal, offal and fish, chicken puree, thickened with egg white is commonly used. After the late-1980s BSE epidemic, the use of calf brain has become unusual even in high-quality Ragout fin.

== See also ==
- List of soups
- List of veal dishes
