= Pariser schnitzel =

French veal cutlet

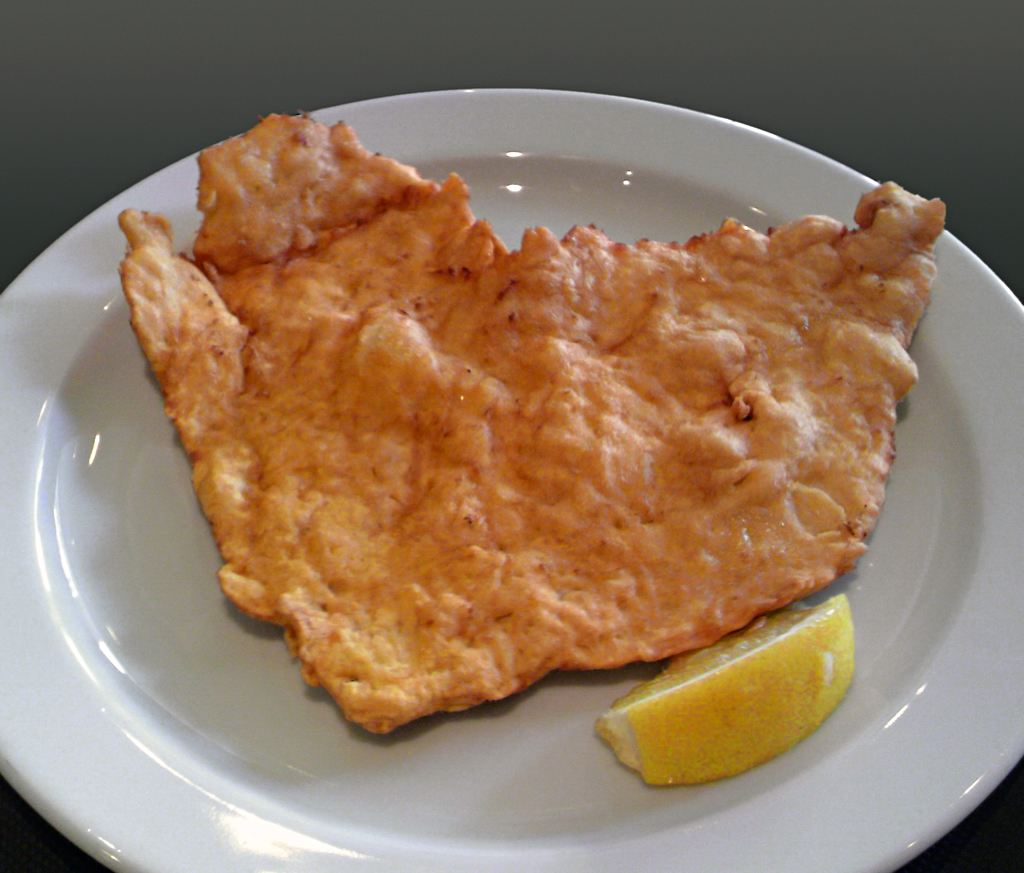
Pariser schnitzel with a slice of lemon

Pariser schnitzel (from German Pariser Schnitzel 'Parisian cutlet') is a schnitzel variation from French cuisine. Unlike Wiener schnitzel, it does not incorporate bread crumbs. The name dates as far back as the World Exhibition in Paris 1889.

Pariser schnitzel is prepared from a thin slice of veal, salted, which is dredged in flour and then dipped in beaten egg. It is then fried in a pan heated to 160–170 °C (320–338 °F), in clarified butter or lard until the outside of the schnitzel turns golden brown. Though not traditional, and providing slightly different results, many modernised recipes substitute vegetable oil, typically canola, for the butter or lard.

== See also ==
- List of veal dishes
