= Jellied veal =

Swedish cold cut dish

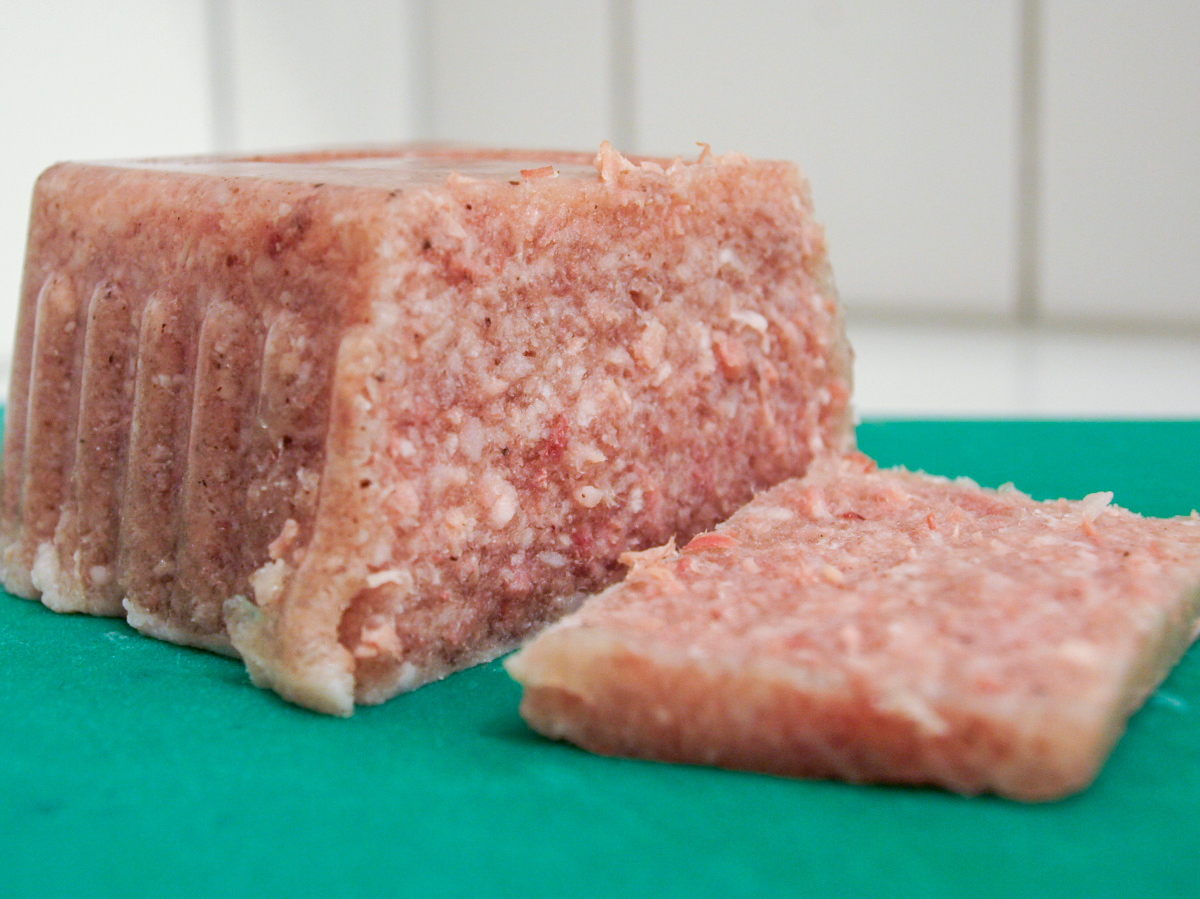
Jellied veal

Jellied veal (or veal brawn, Swedish: kalvsylta) is a cold cut dish made from veal, sometimes pork, stock, onion and spices such as allspice, bay leaf and white pepper. It is eaten cold from the fridge, often with potatoes and pickled beetroot or sliced on crisp bread. It is a traditional dish for Christmas in Sweden. Jellied veal is considered one of the few remaining dishes from the original Swedish Christmas smorgasbord.

== Preparation ==
The meat is cooked in salted water until it falls off the bone and then cut into fine pieces. The cut meat is then mixed with the stock and left to cool in a vessel until it congeals.

== See also ==
- Aspic
- Head cheese
- List of veal dishes
- Calf's heel jelly
