= Blanquette de veau =

French veal ragout

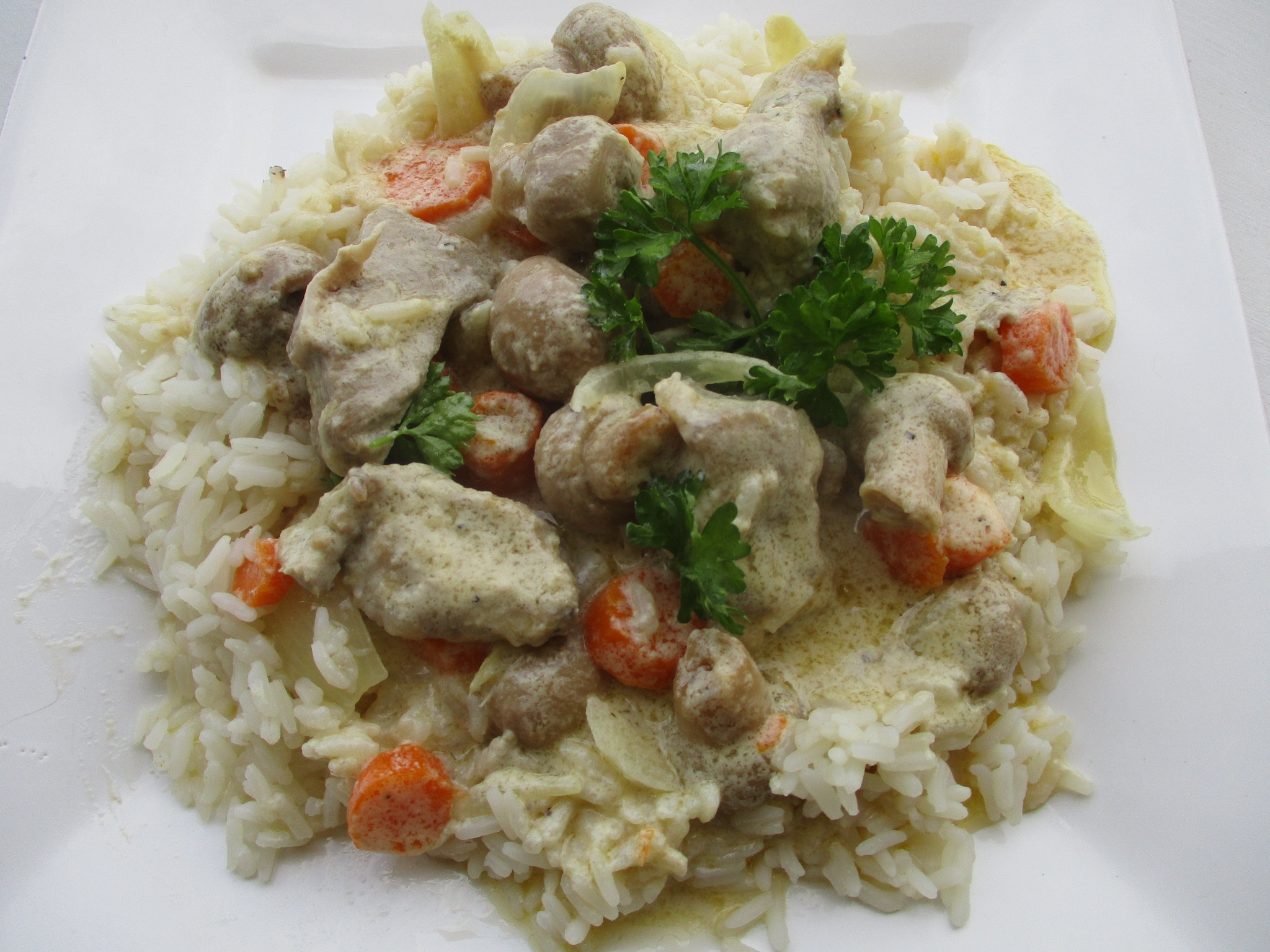
- Type: Stew
- Place of origin: France
- Region or state: Normandy
- Main ingredients: Veal, mirepoix, butter or cream, flour

Blanquette de veau (French pronunciation: [blɑ̃kɛt də vo]) is a French veal stew. In the classic version of the dish the meat is simmered in a white stock and served in a sauce velouté enriched with cream and egg.

== Definition ==
The Oxford Companion to Food describes "blanquette" as "a French and to some extent international culinary term indicating a dish of white meat (veal, poultry, also lamb) served in a white sauce". In the Larousse gastronomique, Prosper Montagné's definition is "the French term for a ragout of white meat (veal, lamb or poultry) cooked in a white stock or water with aromatic flavourings". (Note: Montagné adds that blanquettes, which had "a very important place in historical cuisine and became a classic of bourgeois cookery", were also made with fish (monkfish) and vegetables (chard and celery).)

In Mastering the Art of French Cooking, Julia Child, Louisette Bertholle and Simone Beck describe blanquette de veau as "a much-loved stew in France … veal simmered in a lightly seasoned white stock … served in a sauce velouté made from the veal cooking stock and enriched with cream and egg yolks". In 2007 Anne Willan wrote that French television had recently conducted a poll of favourite meat dishes in which "Blanquette de veau was in the top five, with steak frites and gigot d'agneau [leg of lamb]".

== Ingredients ==
The name "blanquette" derives from "blanc", the French word for white, and there is a purist view that the whiteness of the dish is key, and coloured vegetables such as carrots should not be included. In the words of Anthony Bourdain:

There are certain rules in the world of cooking. One of them is that color contrast is a good thing. A plate with too much white, for instance, cries out for some garnish, some color, something, anything, to distract the eye from all that monochrome. But not this dish. This dish is the exception to the rule. For a chef, it can be maddening to make it for the first time, as the natural impulse, the sum total of all one's training, says "Put some carrot in there – a little chopped parsley, for God's sake!" Resist the urge. It's supposed to be white. All white. Keep it that way. It makes something of a statement.

Some cooks, such as Willan, share Bourdain's view, but numerous cooks from Auguste Escoffier (1907) onwards have included carrots in their recipes for blanquette de veau, though in many cases the carrot is removed prior to serving.

Child, Bertholle and Beck list six suitable cuts of veal for a blanquette: poitrine (breast), haute de côtes (short ribs), épaule (shoulder), côtes découvertes (middle neck) and gîte/jarret (knuckle). Other cooks and food writers have differed in their recommended cuts for the dish:

Cook/writer	Recommended cut	Ref.
James Beard	shoulder	
Mary Berry	shoulder	
Paul Bocuse	flank and tendron (Note: In French butchery the tendrons are from the middle of the underside of the animal, between the breast to the front and the flank to the rear.)	
Anthony Bourdain	neck or shoulder	
Eugénie Brazier	mixture of breast and collar	
Robert Carrier	shoulder or breast	
Craig Claiborne	shoulder	
Auguste Escoffier	breast, shoulder and collar ribs	
Michael Field	leg or rump	
Jane Grigson	shoulder	
Michel Guérard	shoulder	
Edouard de Pomaine	breast	
Joël Robuchon	collar, shoulder or knuckle, and either tendron or breast	
Michel Roux, Jr.	breast	
Louis Saulnier	shoulder or tendron	
Anne Willan	shoulder	
David Leite	(chicken) breast	

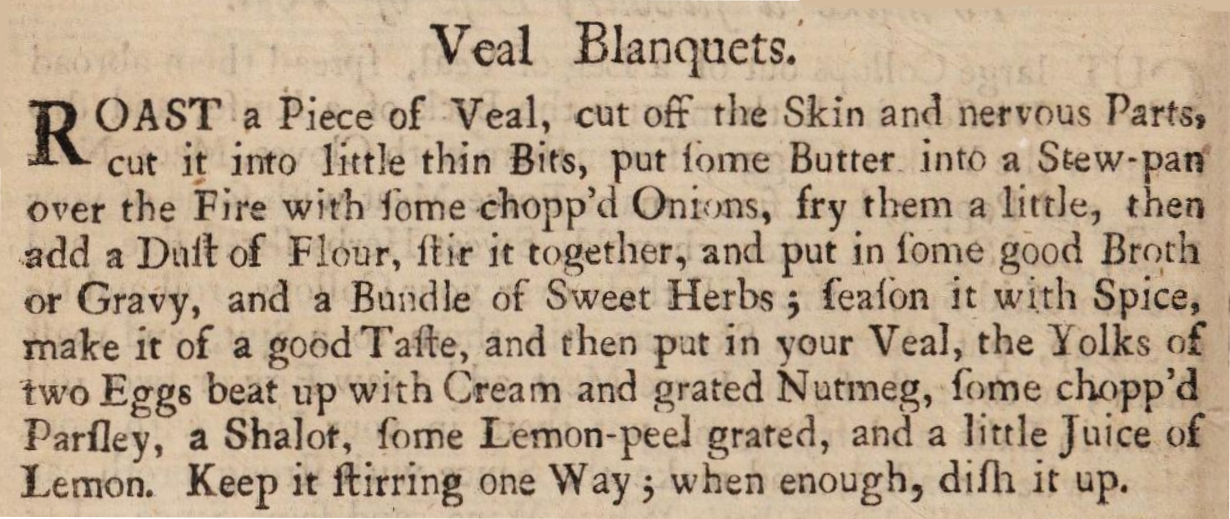
Hannah Glasse's recipe, from the 1770 edition of her The Art of Cookery Made Plain and Easy

In older recipes the veal was roasted and allowed to go cold before being sliced or chopped, covered in a white sauce and reheated. Eliza Acton's 1858 recipe includes mushrooms gently sautéed in butter and served over the veal with "sauce tournée" (also called velouté). There was at one time some question of how blanquettes were to be distinguished from fricassées. In 1960 The Times commented:

Both should be made from fresh meat (usually chicken, veal or lamb) cooked in a flavoured white stock. The meat for a fricassée is often cooked (without browning) in butter before it is simmered. For a blanquette the meat is more often blanched with herbs and seasoning, this liquid being added to a white roux to make the sauce in which the cooking is finished. For both dishes the sauce should be bound with a liaison of egg yolks, cream and lemon juice before serving.

According to Montagné, blanquette de veau is usually served with rice à la créole but may also be served with celeriac, halved celery hearts, carrots, braised parsnips or leeks, braised cucumber, braised lettuce or lettuce hearts. Pasta or potatoes are sometimes served instead of rice, and Escoffier recommends noodles.

== Notes, references and sources ==
=== Sources ===
- Acton, Eliza (1858) [1845]. Modern Cookery, in All Its Branches. Philadelphia: Lea and Blanchard. OCLC 191115250.
- Beard, James (1959). The James Beard Cookbook. New York: Dell. OCLC 1035934036.
- Berry, Mary (1972). Popular Freezer Cookery. London: Octopus. ISBN 978-0-7064-0159-2.
- Bocuse, Paul (2002). Les meilleures recettes des régions de France. Paris: Flammarion. ISBN 978-2-08-200929-4.
- Bourdain, Anthony (2004). Anthony Bourdain's Les Halles cookbook. London: Bloomsbury. ISBN 978-0-7475-8012-6.
- Brazier, Eugénie; Moreau, Roger; Bocuse, Paul; Pacaud, Bernard (2015) [2004]. La Mère Brazier: The Mother of Modern French Cooking. Translated by Drew Smith. London: Modern Books. ISBN 978-1-906761-84-4.
- Carrier, Robert (1983). Great Dishes of the World. New York: A & W. ISBN 978-0-89479-134-5.
- Child, Julia; Bertholle, Louisette; Beck, Simone (2012) [1961]. Mastering the Art of French Cooking, Volume One. London: Particular. ISBN 978-0-241-95339-6.
- Claiborne, Craig (1973). A Kitchen Primer. London: Penguin. ISBN 978-0-14-046172-5.
- Davidson, Alan (1999). The Oxford Companion to Food. Oxford: Oxford University Press. ISBN 978-0-19-211579-9.
- Escoffier, Auguste (1907). Le guide culinaire: aide-mémoire de cuisine pratique. Paris: Colin. OCLC 969508192.
- Field, Michael (1965). Michael Field's Cooking School. New York: M. Barrows. OCLC 1036710870.
- Francatelli, Charles Elmé (1911) [1845]. The Modern Cook. London: Macmillan. OCLC 862897713.
- Grigson, Jane (1975). The Mushroom Feast. London: Penguin. ISBN 978-0-14-046273-9.
- Montagne, Prosper (2001). Larousse Gastronomique. New York: Clarkson Potter. ISBN 978-0-609-60971-2.
- Pomiane, Edouard de (1938). 365 menus, 365 recettes. Paris: A Michel. OCLC 459599801.
- Robuchon, Joël (2011). Dudemaine, Sophie (ed.). La cuisine de Robuchon par Sophie. Paris: Ducasse. ISBN 978-2-84123-334-2.
- Roux, Michel Jr (2009). A Life in the Kitchen. London: Weidenfeld & Nicolson. ISBN 978-0-297-84482-2.
- Saulnier, Louis (1978) [1923]. Le répertoire de la cuisine (fourteenth ed.). London: Jaeggi. OCLC 1086737491.
- Willan, Anne (2007). The Country Cooking of France. San Francisco: Chronicle Books. ISBN 978-0-8118-4646-2.

== See also ==
- Cuisine of France
- List of stews
- List of veal dishes
