= Wallenbergare =

Swedish veal dish

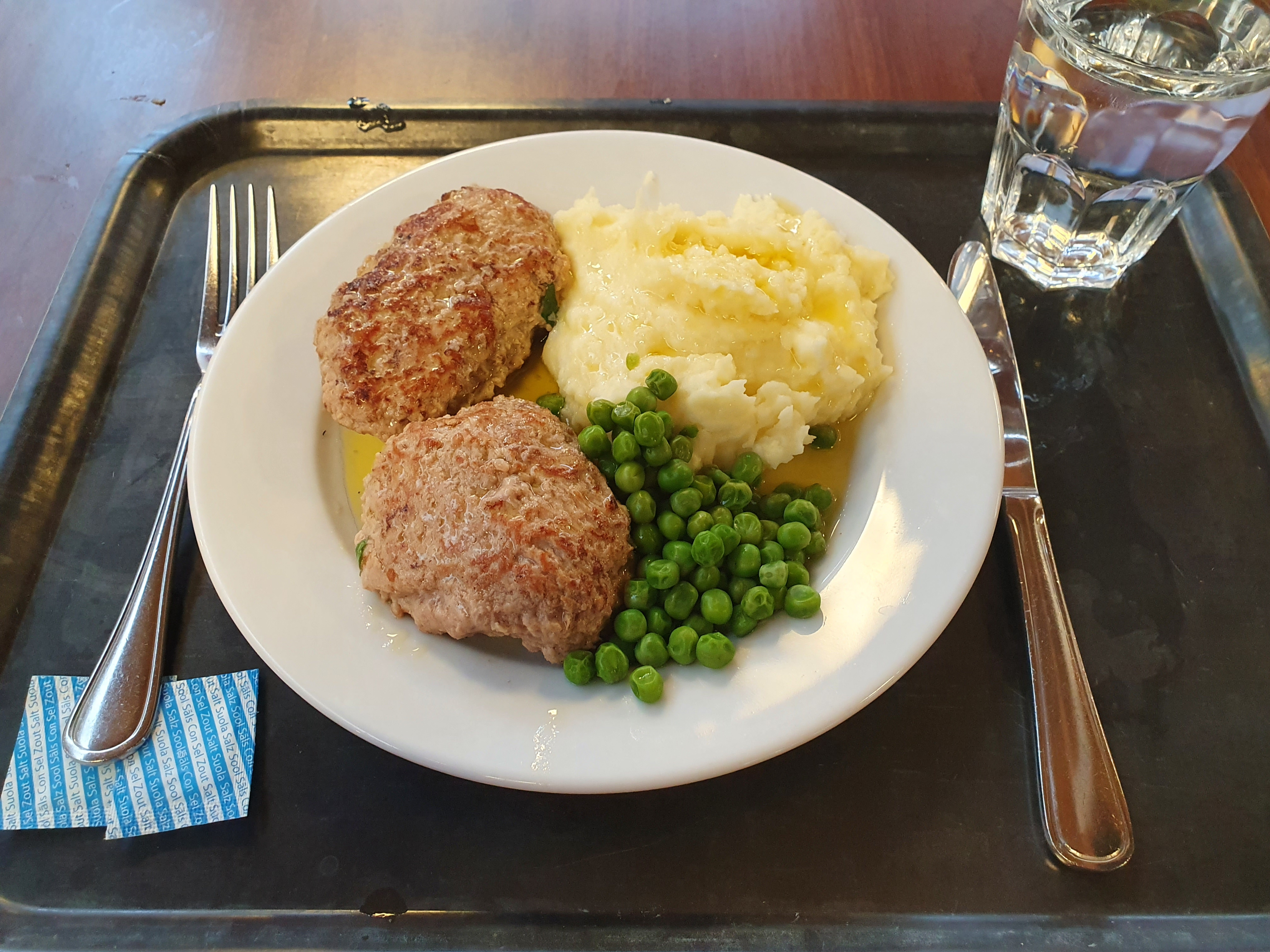
Wallenbergare

Wallenbergare is a Swedish dish generally consisting of ground veal, cream, egg yolks and coated in breadcrumbs. It is traditionally served with boiled or mashed potatoes, lingonberry jam and green peas.

There are various theories about the origin of this recipe. Credit is generally given to Julius Carlsson (1898-1976), chef de cuisine at the restaurant Cecil on Norrmalm in Stockholm. According to some, the dish was named after banker Marcus Wallenberg, Sr. (1864–1943) or his wife Amalia Wallenberg (1890–1943), daughter of cookbook author Charles Emil Hagdahl (1809-1897).

== See also ==
- Cutlet
  - Pozharsky cutlet
- List of veal dishes
