= Saltimbocca =

Italian dish

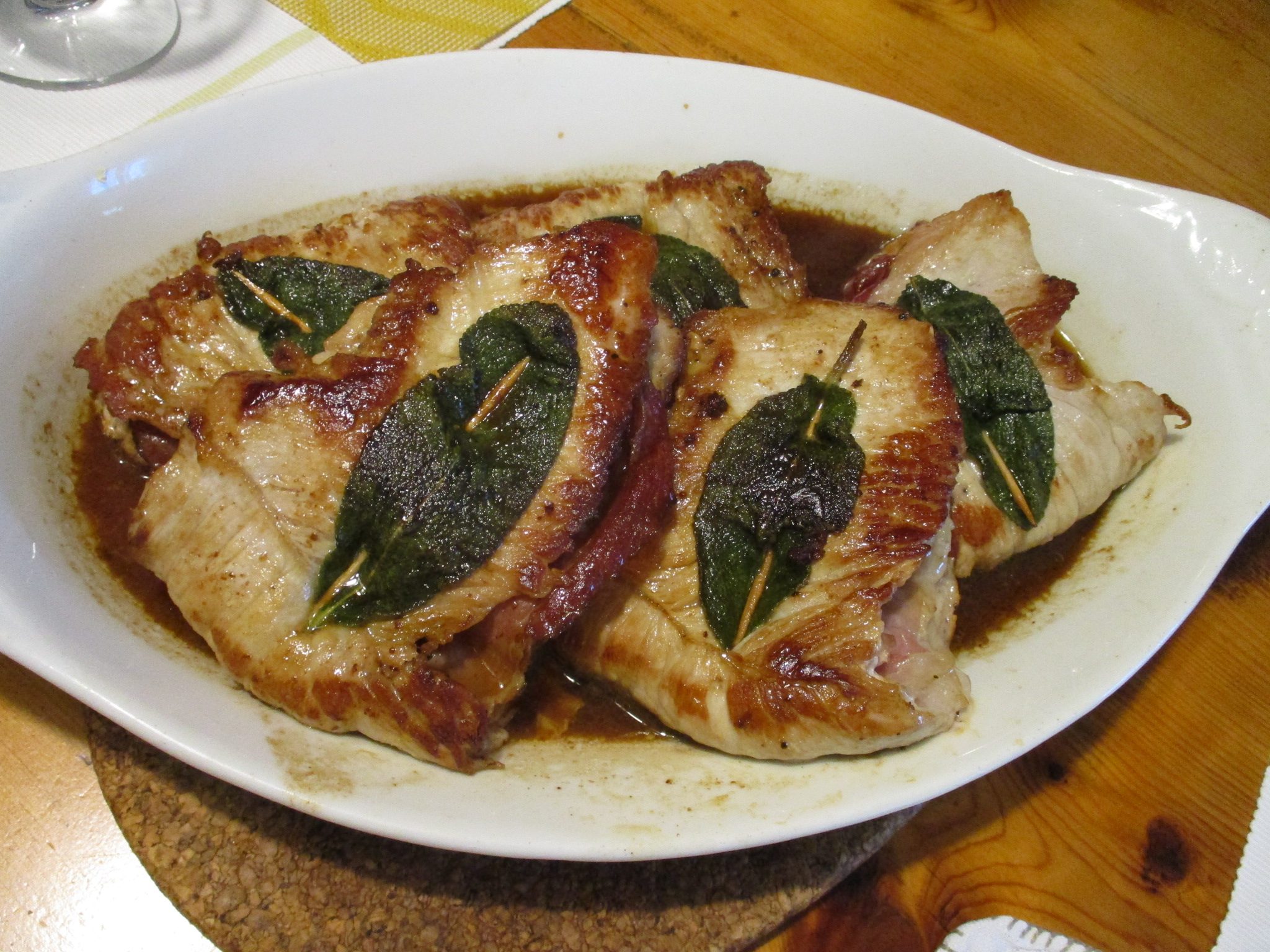
- Saltimbocca (cooked)
- Course: Secondo (Italian course)
- Place of origin: Italy
- Region or state: Rome
- Main ingredients: Veal, prosciutto, sage

Saltimbocca (UK: /ˌsæltɪmˈbɒkə, -ˈboʊkə/, US: /ˌsɔːl-/, Italian: [ˌsaltimˈbokka]; lit. '[it] jump[s] in the mouth') is an Italian dish (also popular in southern Switzerland). It consists of veal that has been wrapped (lined) with prosciutto and sage and then marinated in wine, oil or salt water, depending on the region or one's own taste.

The original version of this dish is saltimbocca alla romana (lit. 'Roman-style saltimbocca'), which consists of veal, prosciutto and sage, rolled up and cooked in dry white wine and butter. Marsala is sometimes used. Also, sometimes the veal and prosciutto are not rolled up but left flat. An American variation replaces the veal with chicken or pork.

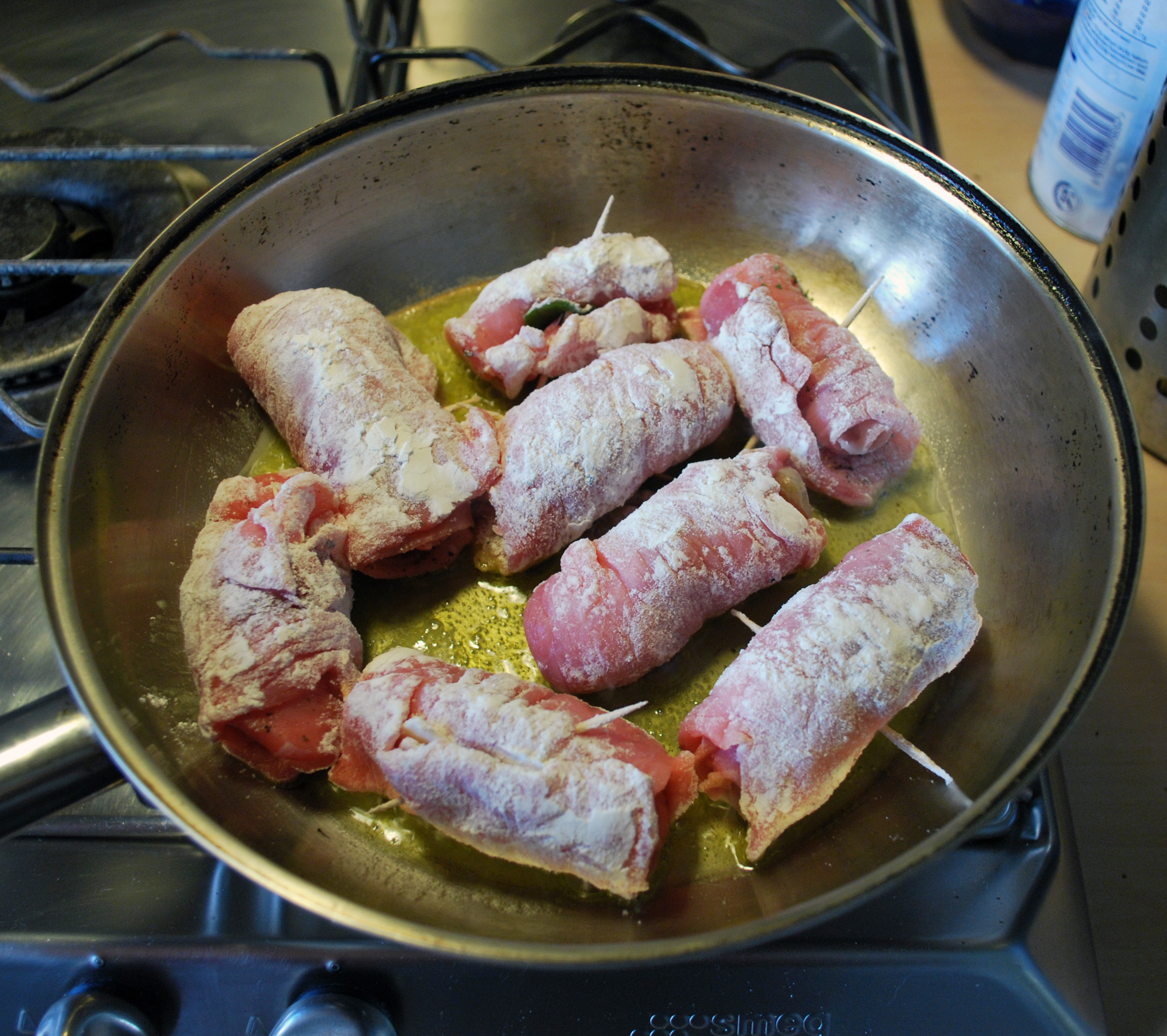
Saltimbocca alla romana cooking

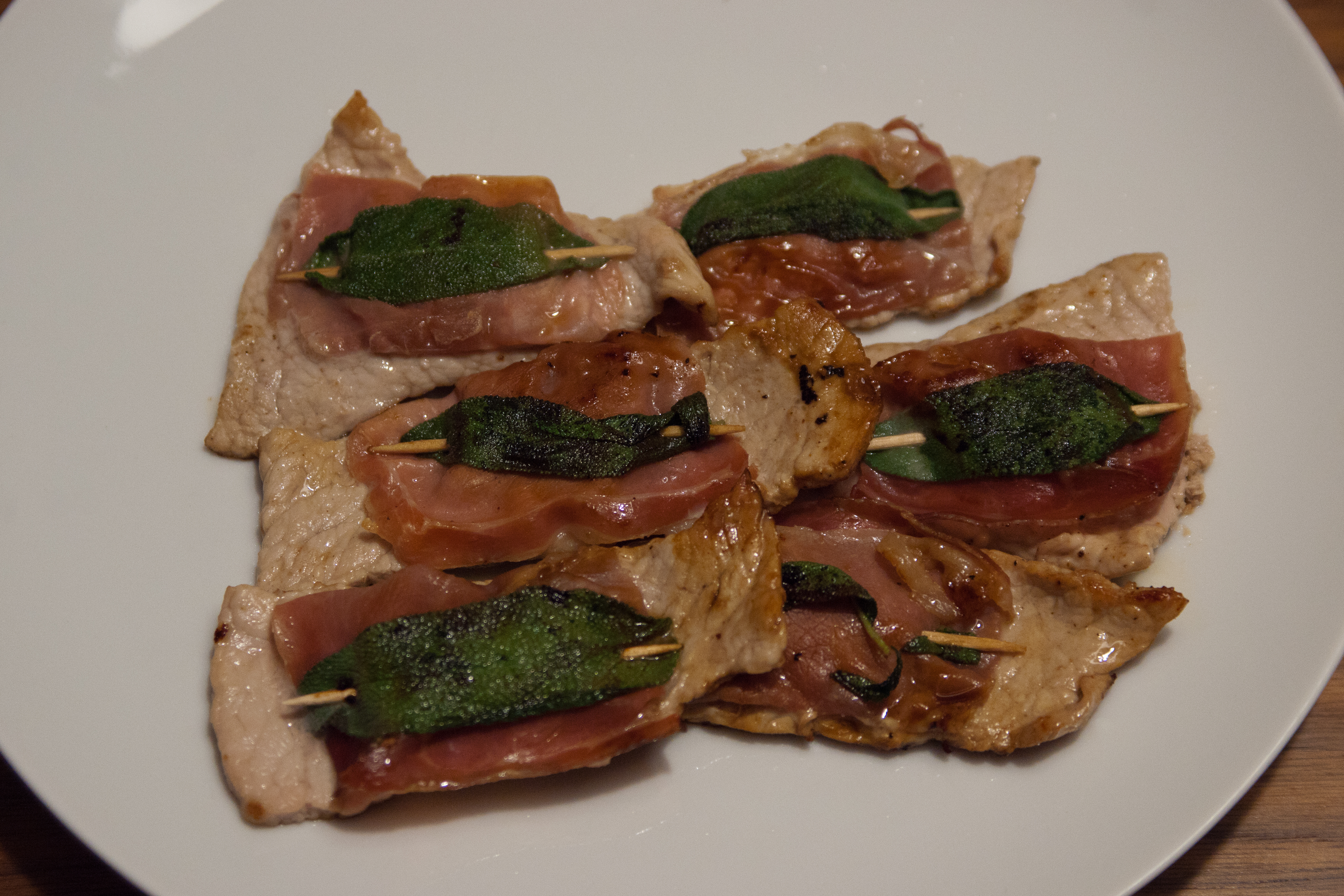
Saltimbocca (cooked)

== See also ==
- List of veal dishes
