= Jello shot =

Gelatin and alcohol shot

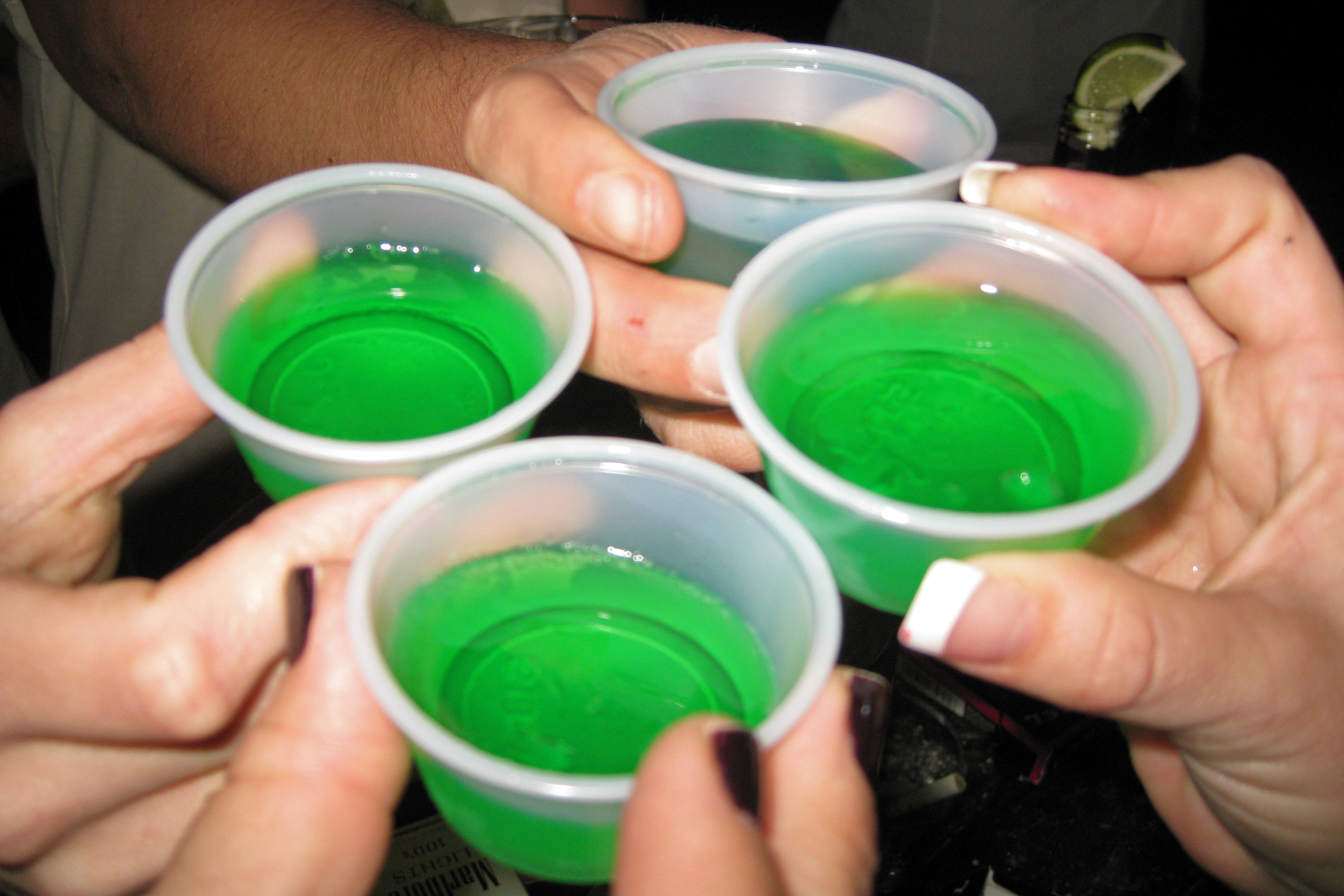
- Lime jello shots
- Type: Mixed drink
- Ingredients: Gelatin mix (normally Jell-O), water, alcohol
- Standard drinkware: various (cup, glass, bowl, tray, etc)
- Served: cold, set in a solid state

A jello shot, colloquially, or Jell-O shot, is a gelatin and alcohol mixture consumed as a shot. The shot is commonly made with vodka or other hard liquors. Shots made with non-branded or unflavored gelatin rather than Jell-O are sometimes known as jelly shots or gelatin shots, particularly in countries outside North America where jello is not the prevailing term.

== Description ==
A jello shot is made by adding an alcoholic beverage to the gelatin mixture, complementing the water normally used to make gelatin. The shots are named after the popular jelly brand Jell-O, although the term jello shot has since become genericized.

The shot is normally served in shot glasses, plastic cups, or ice-cube trays. Jell-O shots are commonly made with vodka but can be prepared using almost any type of hard liquor, grain alcohol, or wine. Fruit juices or flavored alcohol can be used in the shot to add extra flavor or mask the taste of alcohol.

Proper proportioning of alcohol and water is needed to ensure the shot mixture is properly set – this proportioning can vary based on the type of alcohol used. Some liquids like pineapple juice will disrupt the ability of the gelatin mixture to set and should be avoided.

Jello shots are commonly associated with spring break, though variations exist for other holidays. The shot is popular due to its low cost and easy preparation.

Some vendors sell pre-made gelatin shots for consumption. Vegan variants of the shots exist, featuring seaweed or agar instead of animal-derived gelatin.

== History ==
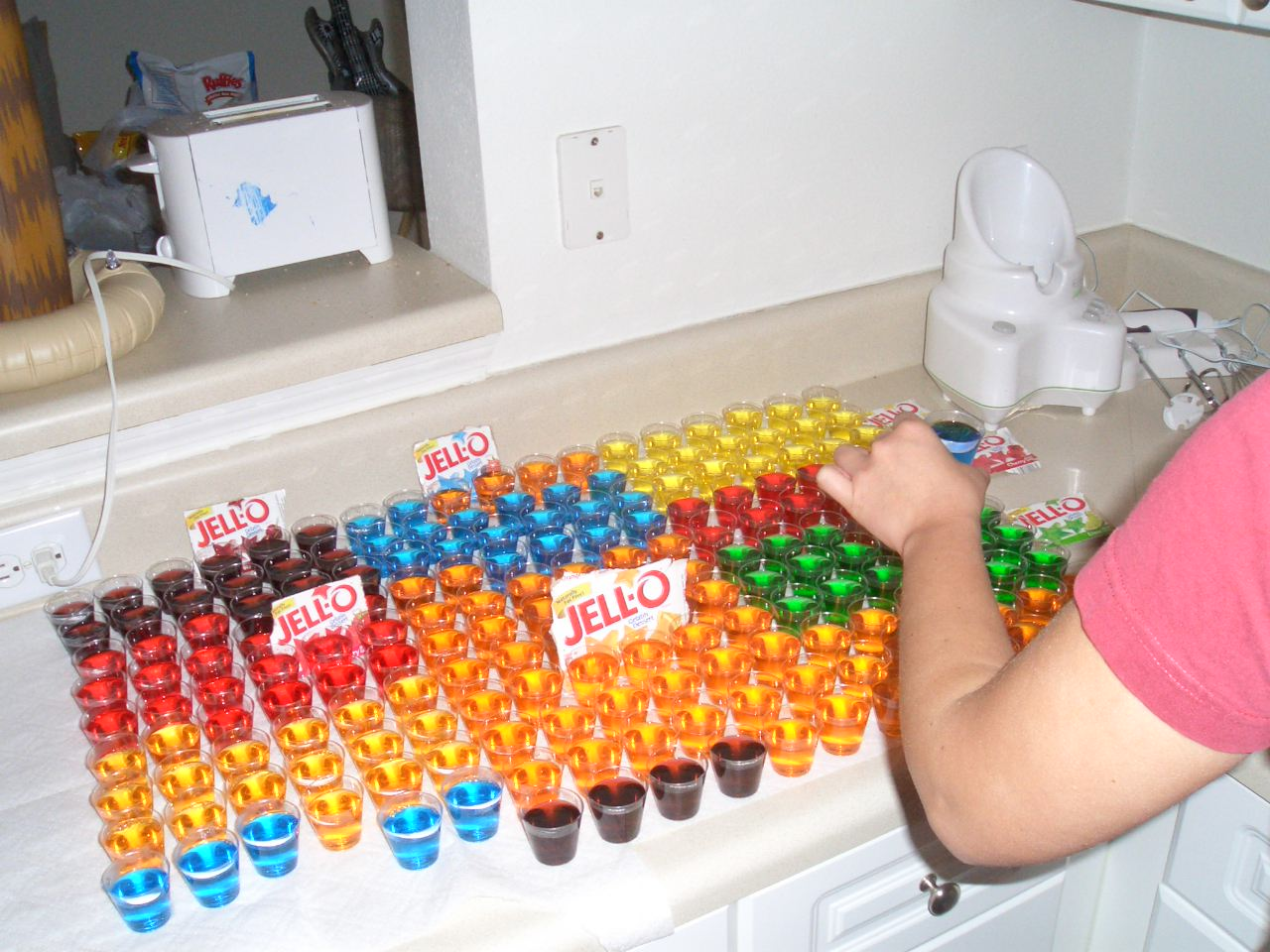
A selection of jello shots

The exact origin of the jello shot is not currently known, as gelatin and alcohol mixtures predate the commercialization of Jell-O in 1897. Several precursors to jello shots have been described, such a recipe in the 14th century Le Viandier de Taillevent for aspic flavored with wine. The invention of gelatin powders in the 19th century resulted in the popularization of jellies, some of which involved combining alcohol with gelatin; famed bartender Jerry Thomas included a recipe for a "punch jelly" in his 1862 work How to Mix Drinks that called for adding isinglass gelatin to a bowl of fruit punch spiked with cognac and rum. The jello shot is sometimes attributed to 19th-century chef Marie-Antoine Carême, who created a recipe for pink champagne jelly flavored with orange flowers. The San Francisco Chronicle claims to have published the first recipe for a jello shot; in 1902 the newspaper published a recipe for a "wine jelly" made with lemon Jell-O, orange slices, and sherry.

Modern jello shots originated in the 1950s when Jell-O was at the height of its popularity in the United States. Multiple sources attribute the creation of the modern jello shot to American satirist and musician Tom Lehrer, who claimed to have invented the jello shot as a way to circumvent a ban on alcohol at a navy base he was stationed at. According to Lehrer, he and a friend were barred from bringing alcoholic beverages to a Christmas party at a naval base, and so the two mixed orange Jell-O with vodka in cups so that the mixture could be smuggled into the party. Comedian Luke Ski later wrote a song celebrating Lehrer's creation of the shot.

Changing tastes and economic trends resulted in a decline of Jell-O sales in the 1960s and 1970s. However, jello shots remained in demand, reaching their now-established level of popularity in the 1980s.

== See also ==
- Alcopop
- Beer pong
- Drinking game
- Calf's heel jelly § As delicacy
