= Calf's heel jelly =

Gelatinous offal concoction

Calf's foot jelly made according to the mid-18th century Norfolk recipe below

Calf's heel jelly, cow-heel jelly, ox-heel jelly, ox-foot jelly, calf's foot jelly, calves' foot jelly (and so forth) is an old-time gelatinous concoction. Another term, now archaic, neat's foot jelly, first occurs in the 15th century. Cow's trotters are a type of offal. Gelatin is rendered out of the feet and clarified, then sweet or savory additions, flavorings, and food coloring can be mixed into the jelly before it is chilled, set, and stored away. Since producing cow-foot jelly is laborious and time-consuming, it came to be seen as a fairly luxurious food. Heel jelly's reputation as a nourishing delicacy may have been derived to some extent from the added claret, sherry, or brandy. Calf's heel jelly is also high in protein, and thus it was considered a nutritious and sustaining food for the sickly or weak.

== Preparation ==
Recipes for cowslip wine, calf's-foot jelly, and "strong mead," from a handwritten cookbook created mid-1700s in Norfolk, England (Ohio State University Rare Books and Manuscripts Library)

Producing calf-heel jelly takes at least two days. In 1877, the author of Practical Cooking presented a recipe for calf-heel jelly and then advised her readers not to bother with it.

An 1857 tome claiming to contain 3,700 "facts worth knowing," advised to buy the feet from a butcher shop instead of a tripe shop, and then "slit them in two, and take every particle of fat from the claws," wash, "boil gently" for six hours "until reduced to about two quarts, then strain and skim off any oily substance on the surface. It is best to boil the feet the day before making the jelly, as, when the liquor is cold, the oily part being at the top, and the other being firm, with pieces of kitchen paper applied to it, you may remove every particle of the oily substance without wasting the liquor."

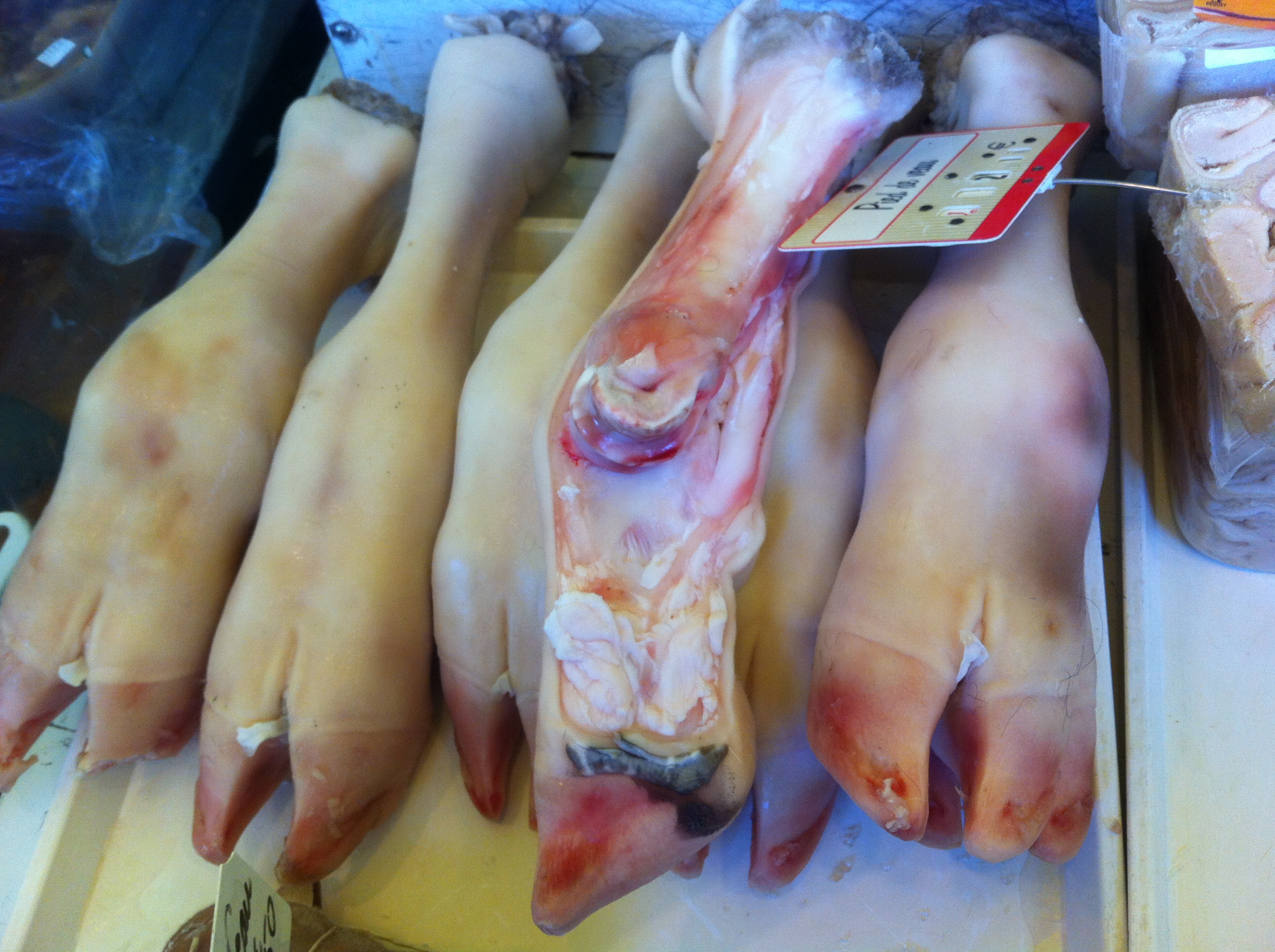
Pieds de veau on sale in a Paris shop

One 1827 formulation advised beginning with a "very strong cow-heel jelly" to which was added "equal parts of white wine; season with lemon-juice, zest, and sugar; to each pint of flummery add three very fresh yolks; beat well, and heat it over a stove, stirring constantly; dish and stir it till cold, and put it into cups or glasses." According to one recipe published in 1888, the basic process after boiling and skimming was to "Strain through a colander, weigh the gelatinous paste and add to it its weight of sugar; put on the fire to thicken, stirring all the while to prevent burning; flavour with orange flower water or any extract you prefer. When done pour the jelly into pots or glass jars whilst warm. Cover with rounds of paper soaked in brandy." In one recipe, a bottle of sherry could be substituted for the juice of four lemons.

== Invalid cookery ==
During the 19th century, cookbooks often contained sections on invalid cookery, giving advice on how to feed and treat the ill and convalescent. Among these dishes and drinks, calf's heel jelly was well regarded as suitable for the invalid, often served with wine and lemon juice. In 1827, heel jelly was recommended as the basis for a "strengthening flummery for invalids." According to one guide to convalescent cookery, calves'-foot jelly was "an expensive dish. Gelatine, which is often substituted for calves' feet, has no nourishing properties." A 1905 postpartum dietary plan prescribed calf's-foot jelly for supper on the third day after giving birth.

== As delicacy ==
Calf jelly was more expensive than cow jelly. Common people made these desserts only on special occasions or for gifts; production in quantity required a dedicated kitchen staff. Jelly molds introduced in the Victorian era gave jellies new, more romantic shapes.

Illustration of common 19th-century Anglo-American desserts, including jellies (The everyday cook and recipe book, 1891)

An archeological study of what had been of a basement coffee house in 18th-century Cambridge, England, found "18 jelly glasses, alongside a quantity of feet bones from immature cattle" which suggested that "calf's foot jelly, a popular dish of that era, might well have been a house speciality." Wine cocktails enjoyed at Oxford University in the early 19th century incorporated calf's-foot jelly.

Calf's-heel jelly appears in a description of hospitality in 19th-century Tennessee: "The ladies kept nice things in the house, so that they might prepare for unexpected company. They always kept calf-heel jelly on hand, and dried beef and cakes of every kind. A delightful dish for breakfast was made by putting the calf-heels in batter and frying them." Similarly, the cornucopia of 1840s Galena, Illinois, yielded many bounties, including jelly: "Game of all kinds was plentiful, from venison to quail. A Christmas dinner would not have been complete without a wild turkey at one end of the table and a baked ham at the other, followed by a blazing plum pudding later. There were wonderful trifles, charlotte russes, floating islands, and sparkling calf's foot jelly. Their fruit in winter must be preserved in summer in heavy syrup or brandy—no Mason jars then." An 1881 American recipe for calf's foot blancmange combined one quart stock, a pint of cream, and half a pound of sugar, boiled, strained, and poured into molds.

== Decline ==
Jell-O, and similar brands of powdered "instant" gelatine, were introduced in the last decade of the 19th century. By the 20th century, as domestic servants became less common among the middle classes, the dish suggested frugality more than luxury. It appeared alongside liver, brains, head-cheese, and pig's feet in a 1929 Canadian magazine article about "unusual meat dishes" that could be "highly productive to the housewife in supplying variety to the family meals" at butchering time.

== In popular culture ==
In a 1942 essay, Virginia Woolf described "middlebrow" English-language novels as a "mixture of geniality and sentiment stuck together with a sticky slime of calves-foot jelly."

Calf's-foot jelly is mentioned in the 1914 American novel Pollyanna, and the 1981 film The Great Muppet Caper.

== See also ==
- List of beef dishes
- Sheep's trotter
- Pig's trotter
- Chicken feet
- Jellied veal
- Aspic
- P'tcha
- Jello shots
- Jello salad

== Sources ==
- Ryan, Catherine (1881). Convalescent cookery : a family handbook. Monash University Library Special Collections. London: Chatto & Windus. JSTOR community.41579465.
- Stavely, Keith W. F.; Fitzgerald, Kathleen (2004). America's Founding Food: The Story of New England Cooking. Chapel Hill, North Carolina: University of North Carolina Press. ISBN 0-8078-2894-7.
- Trotter, Christopher (2013). The Whole Cow. London: Pavilion. ISBN 978-1-86205-989-4.
- Wyman, Carolyn (2001). Jell-O: a biography. San Diego: Harcourt Inc. ISBN 978-0-15-601123-5. LCCN 2001024739. OCLC 46822306.
