= List of veal dishes =

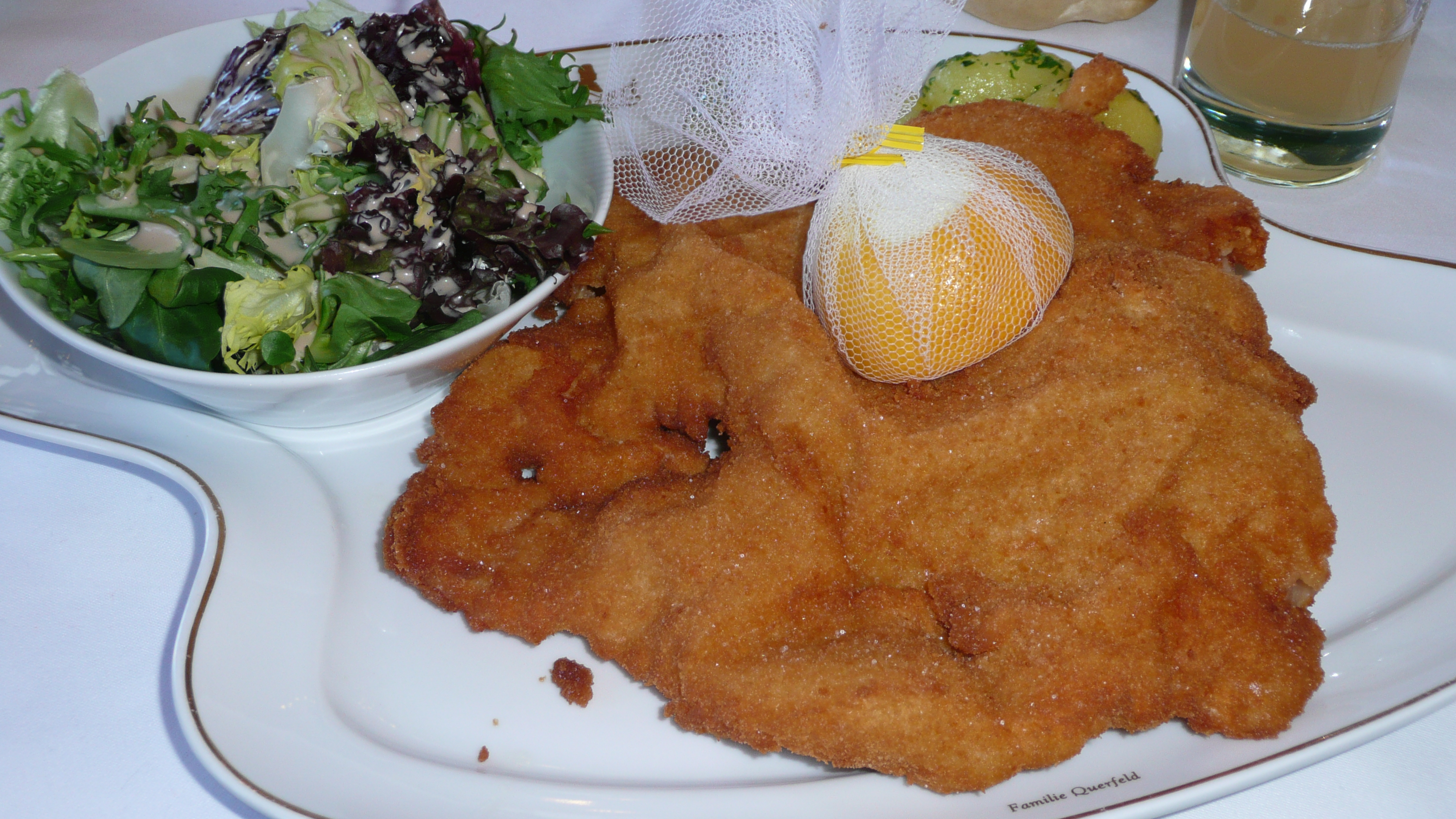
Wiener Schnitzel is a traditional dish in Viennese cuisine, and the national dish of Austria.

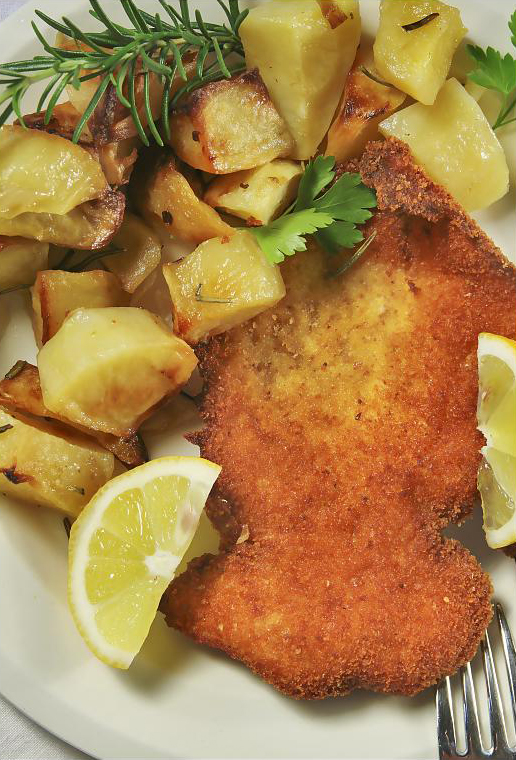
Cotoletta with potato and lemon

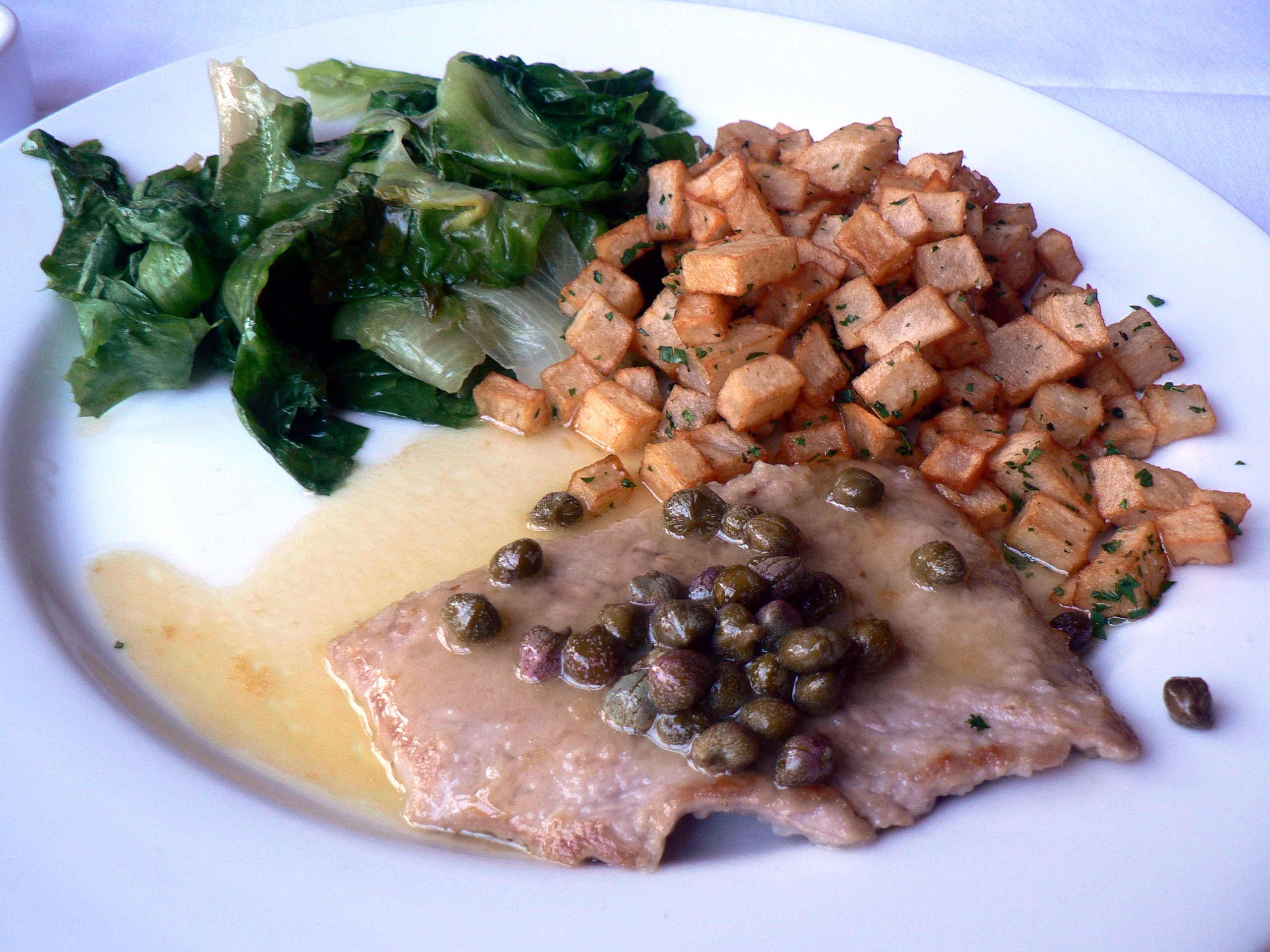
Veal piccata (bottom)

This is a list of veal dishes, which use or may use veal as a primary ingredient. Veal is the meat of young calves, in contrast to the beef from older cattle. Though veal can be produced from a calf of either sex and any breed, most veal comes from male calves. Generally, veal is more expensive than beef from older cattle.

== Veal dishes ==
- Bitok – Franco-Russian dish of minced meat (usually veal or beef) formed into patties and fried; often served with a sour cream sauce
- Blanquette de veau – a French ragout in which neither the veal nor the butter is browned in the cooking process
- Bockwurst – a German sausage traditionally made from ground veal and pork
- Braciola – Any of several Italian dishes
- Bratwurst – a sausage usually composed of veal, pork or beef
- Cachopo – Veal dish from Asturias, Spain
- Calf's liver and bacon – British dish of veal and pork
- Carpaccio – prepared using raw meat; veal is sometimes used
- Cordon bleu – Meat and cheese dish
- Cotoletta – is an Italian word for a breaded cutlet of veal
- Hortobágyi palacsinta – a savory Hungarian pancake, filled with meat (usually veal)
- Jellied veal – a cold cut dish made from minced cooked veal, stock, and spices that sets into a spread
- Jägerschnitzel – breaded veal cutlet with generally an onion and mushroom gravy served with fried potatoes
- Karađorđeva šnicla – a Serbian dish of cheese stuffed and breaded veal, served with tartar sauce and lemon
- Ossobuco - Italian preparation of veal shanks braised with vegetables in white wine and stock
- Pariser Schnitzel – prepared from a thin slice of veal, salted, dredged in flour and beaten eggs, and pan fried in clarified butter or lard
- Veal parmigiana – a breaded and fried veal cutlet in the style of the original Italian eggplant parmigiana
- Paupiette – French savoury dish
- Piccata – a method of preparing food: meat is sliced, coated, sautéed, and served in a sauce. The dish originated in Italy using veal.
- Ragout fin – a soup made of veal, sweetbread, calf brain, tongue, and bone marrow, and chicken breast and fish
- Saltimbocca – Italian dish
- Scaloppine – Type of Italian meat dish
- Schnitzel – Breaded, fried flat piece of meat
- Tas kebap – Middle Eastern veal or mutton stew
- Tourtière – French-Canadian meat pie dish
- Veal Milanese – Italian dish in Milanese Lombard cuisine
- Veal Orloff – French dish named for Russian diplomat
- Veal Oscar – Dish of veal or beef, crab, and sauce
- Vitello tonnato – an italian dish of cold, sliced veal covered with a creamy, mayonnaise-like sauce that has been flavored with tuna
- Wallenbergare – a breaded veal meatloaf in Swedish cuisine traditionally served with boiled or mashed potatoes, lingonberry sauce and green peas
- Weisswurst – a traditional Bavarian sausage made from minced veal and pork back bacon
- Wiener Schnitzel – a very thin, breaded and pan-fried cutlet made from veal, it is one of the best-known specialities of Viennese cuisine. The Wiener Schnitzel is the national dish of Austria.
- Zürcher Geschnetzeltes – a Swiss dish of seared sliced veal in a creamy wine sauce
Veal dishes

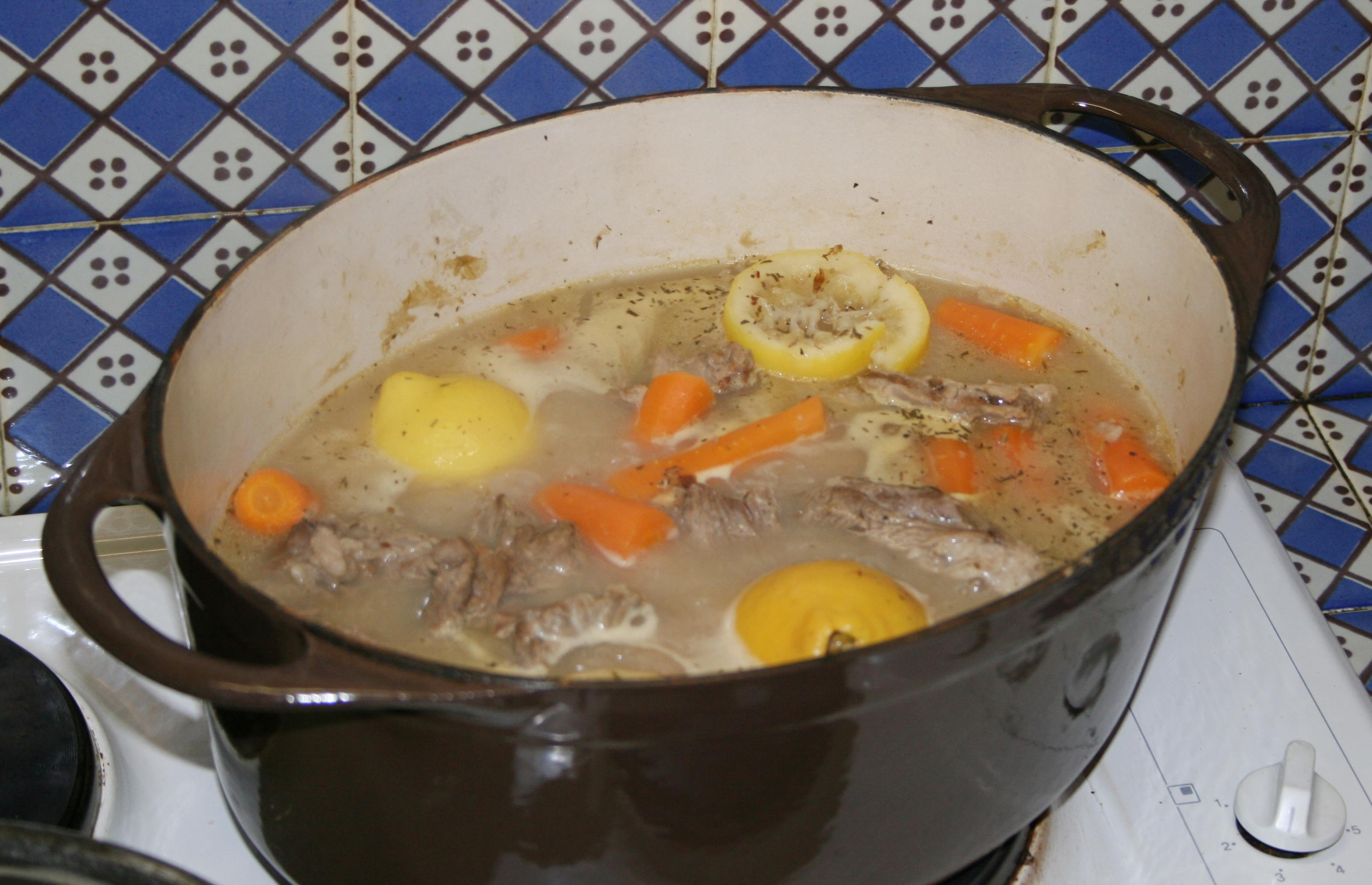
Blanquette de veau

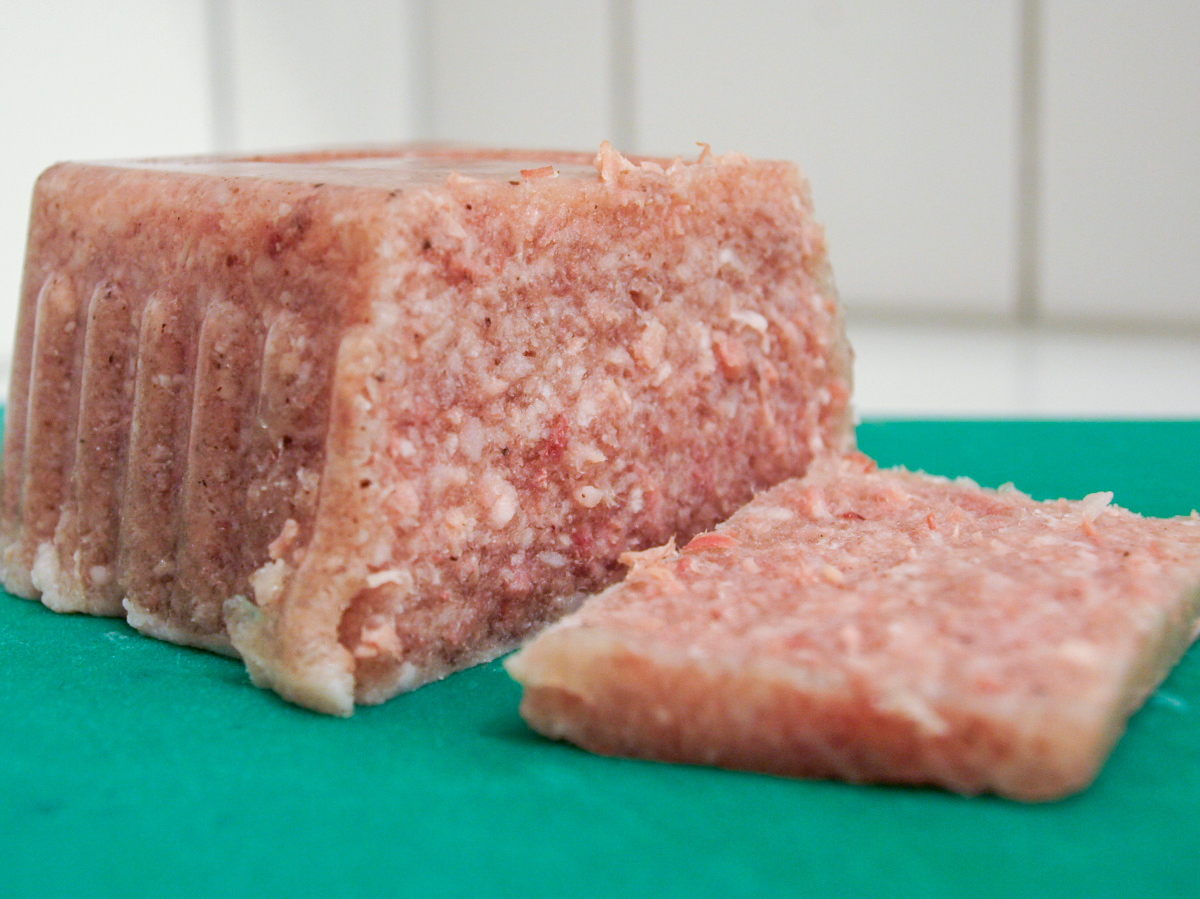
Jellied veal

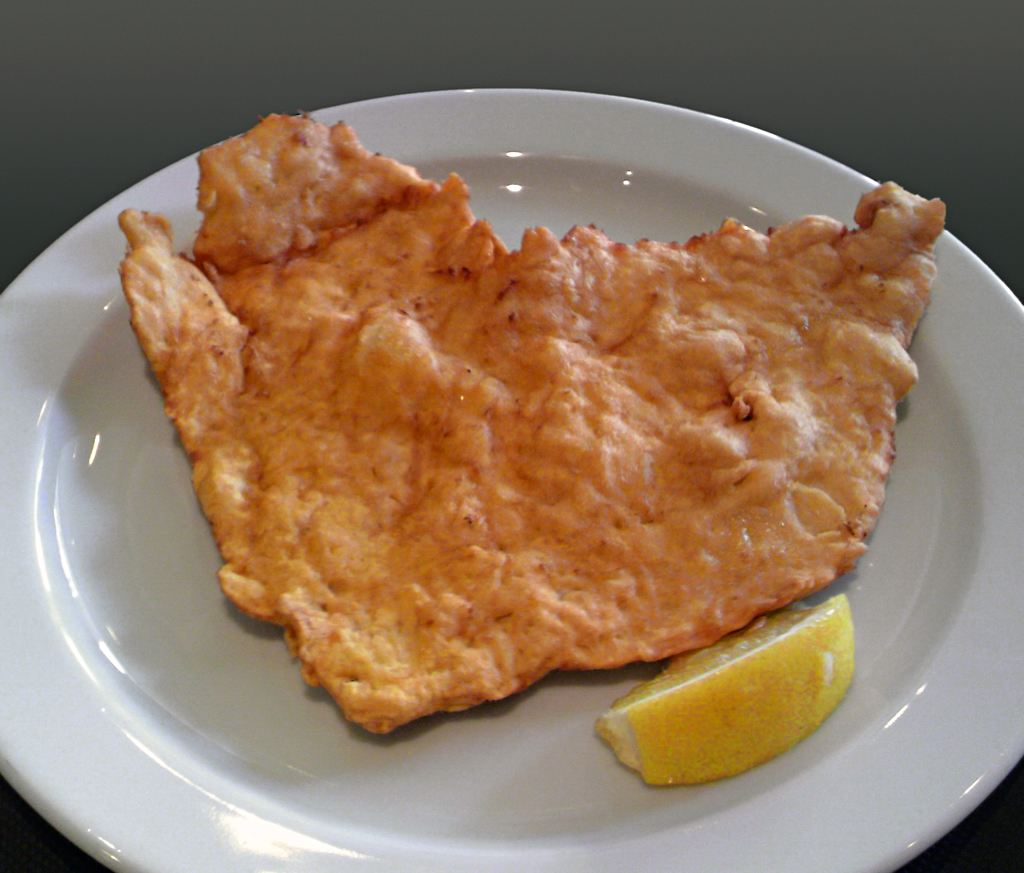
Pariser Schnitzel

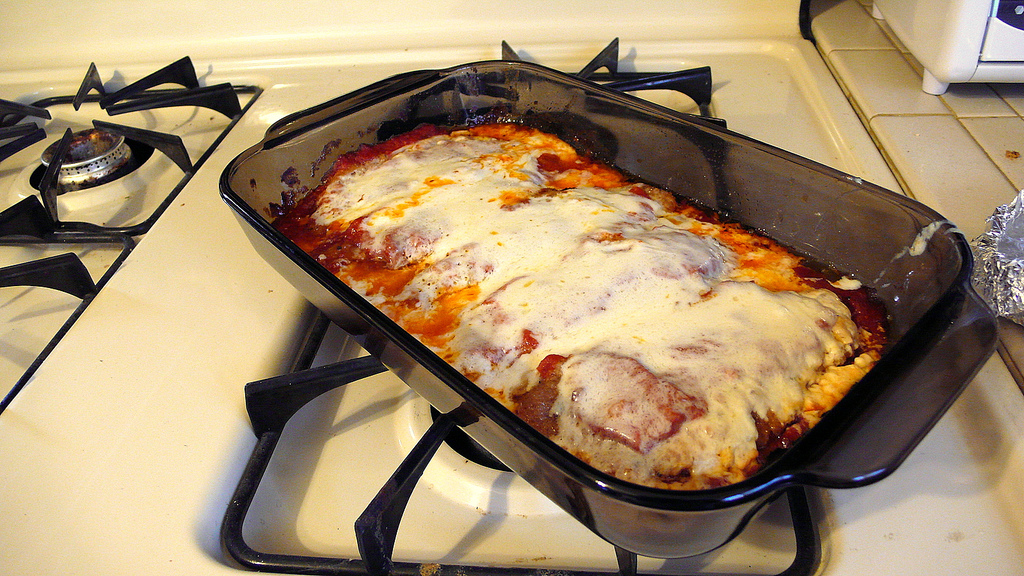
Veal parmigiana

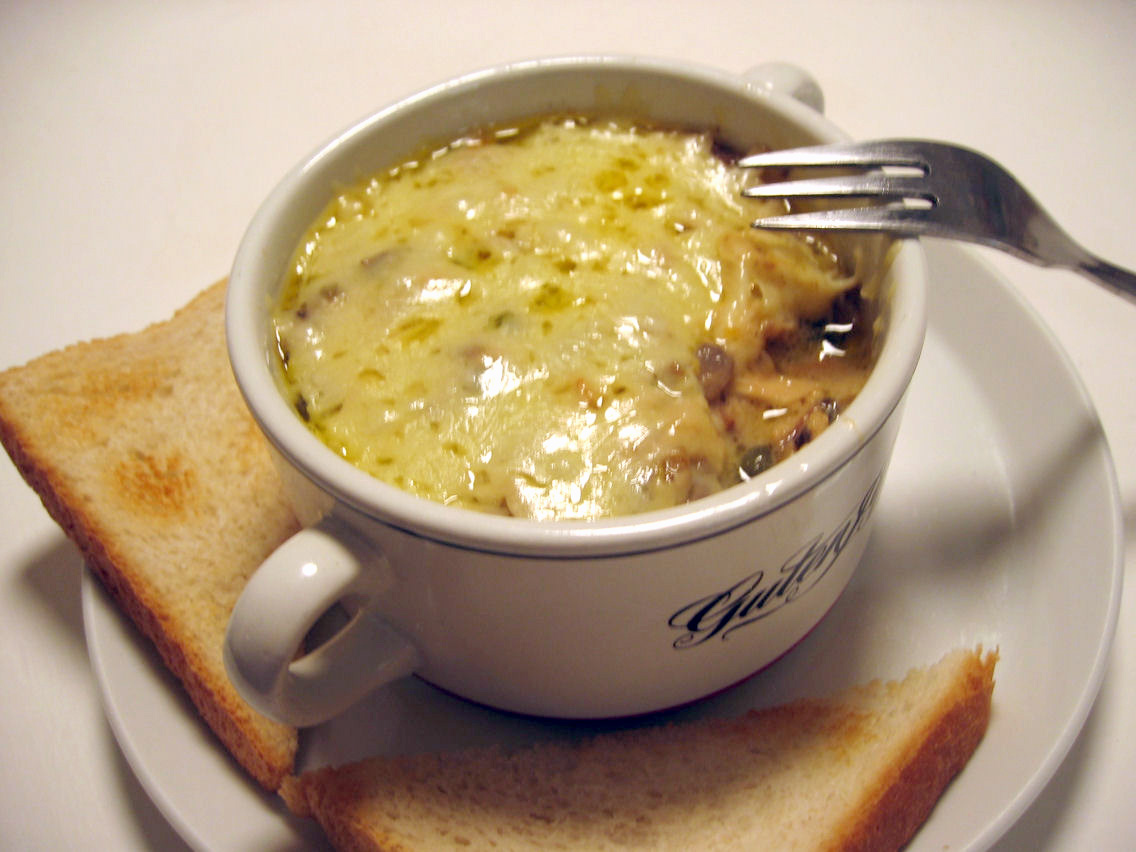
Ragout fin

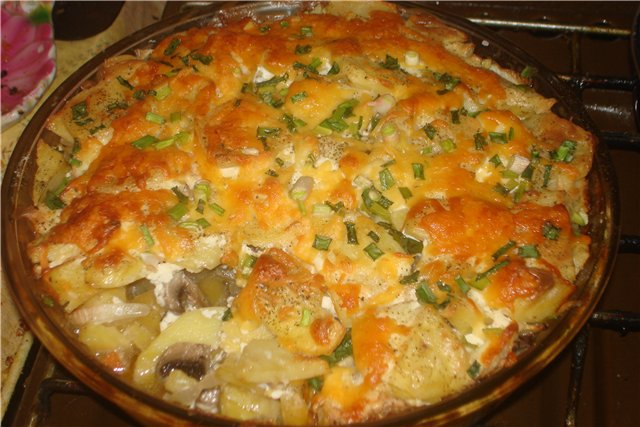
A version of veal Orloff

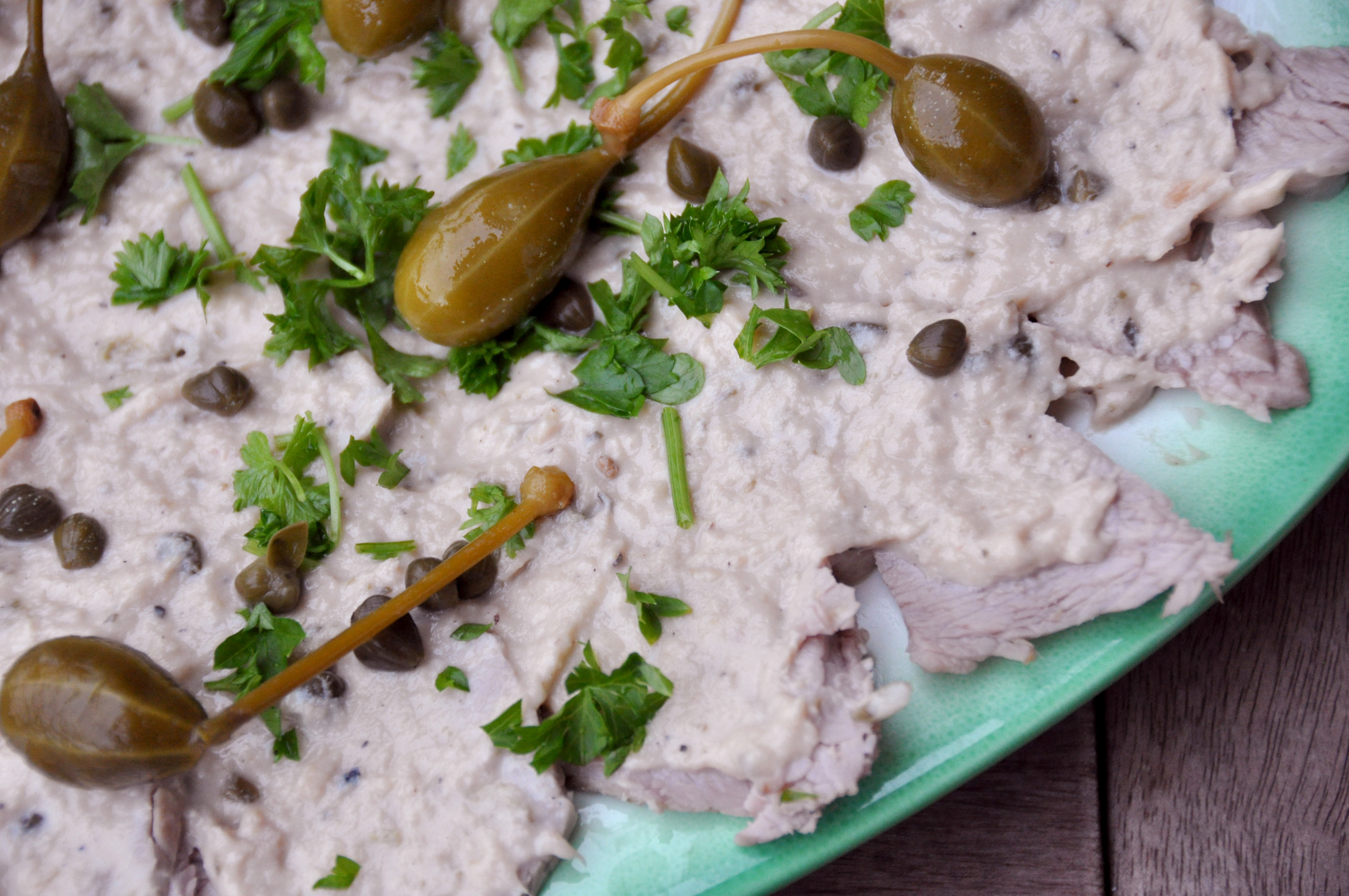
A close-up view of vitello tonnato

== See also ==
- List of beef dishes
- Lists of prepared foods
