= Wiener schnitzel =

Viennese meat dish, breaded veal cutlet

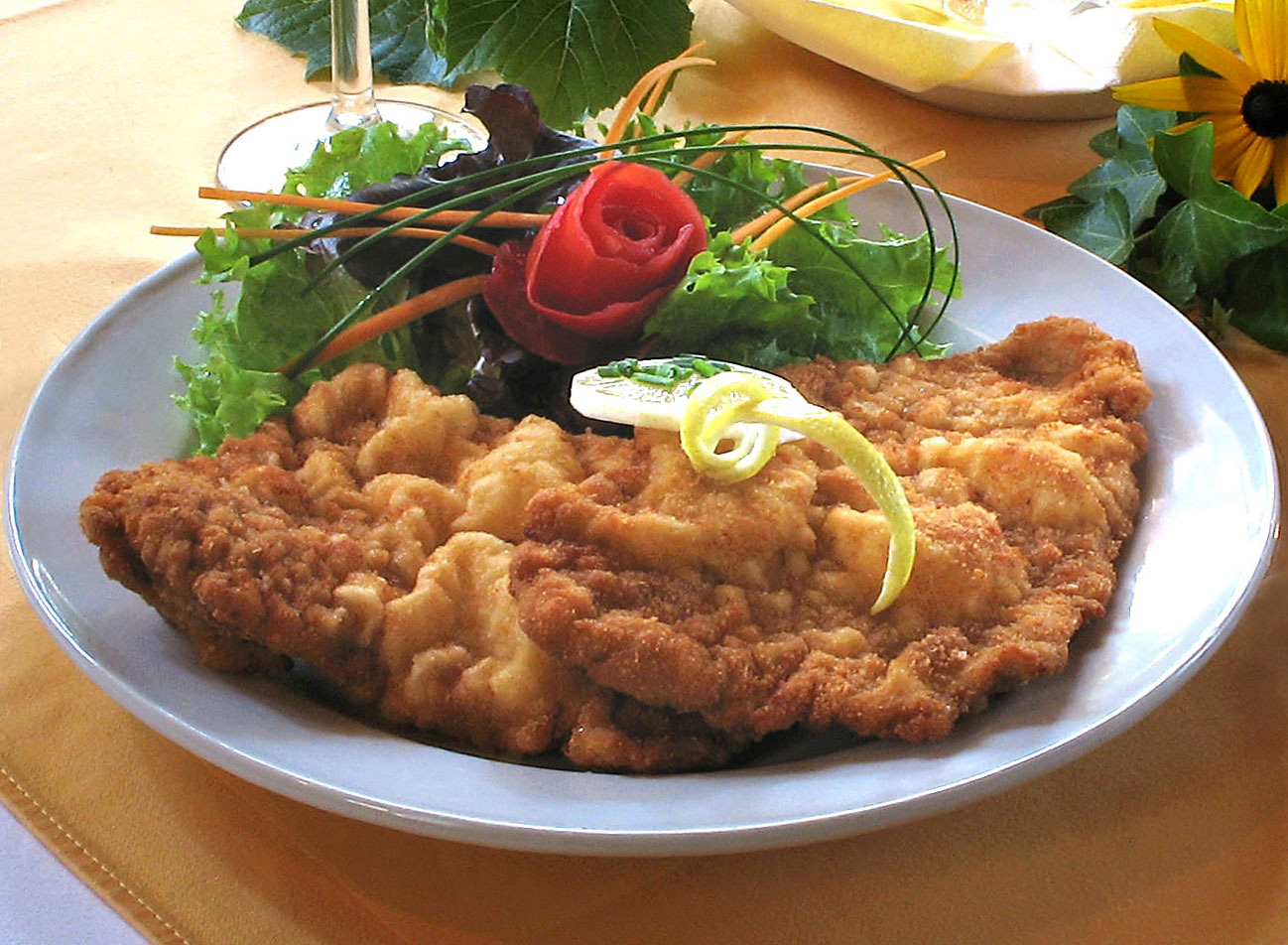
Wiener schnitzel, a traditional Austrian dish

Wiener schnitzel (/ˈviːnər ˈʃnɪtsəl/ VEE-nər SHNIT-səl; German: Wiener Schnitzel [ˈviːnɐ ˈʃnɪtsl̩], lit. "Viennese cutlet"), sometimes spelled Wienerschnitzel, is a type of schnitzel made of a thin, breaded, pan-fried veal cutlet.

It is one of the best known specialities of Viennese cuisine, and one of the national dishes of Austria.

== History and etymology ==
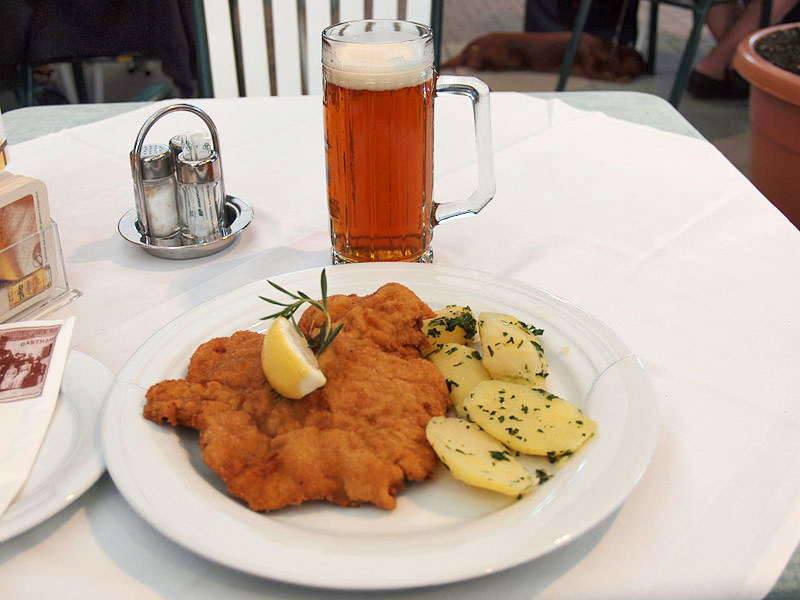
A Wiener schnitzel served at a restaurant in Carinthia, Austria

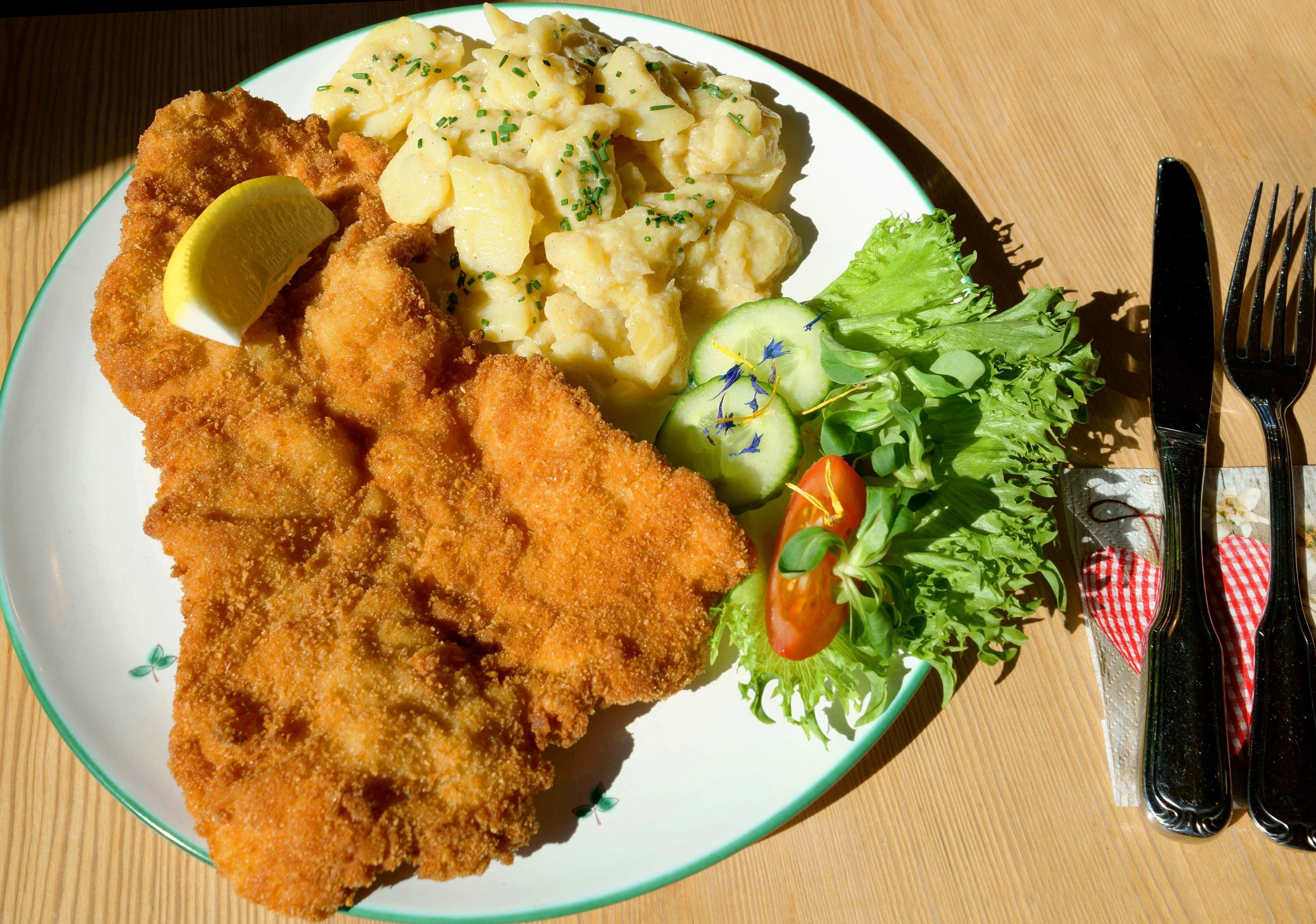
A "real" Wiener schnitzel of veal, with potato salad, green salad and a slice of lemon, served at an Austrian restaurant

The earliest evidence of a schnitzel-like dish comes from Nuremberg, where a recipe for Gebackene Schnitten von einem Rebhuhn (roughly, "fried slices of partridge") can be found in the Nürnbergisches Kochbuch ("Nuremberg Cookbook"), published in 1691. In this instance, the slices of meat were also pounded flat, coated with egg, flour, and breadcrumbs, and then fried in fat.

The designation Wiener Schnitzel first appeared n the 19th century, with the first known mention in a cookbook from 1831. In the popular southern German cookbook by Katharina Prato, it was mentioned as eingebröselte Kalbsschnitzchen (roughly, "breaded veal cutlets").

According to a tale, Field Marshal Joseph Radetzky von Radetz brought the recipe from Italy to Vienna in 1857. This was described by linguist Heinz-Dieter Pohl as invented, who identifies the dish's first mention in connection with Radetzky to 1869 in an Italian gastronomy book (Guida gastronomica d'Italia), which was published in German in 1871 as Italien Tafel. The story, he says, is instead concerned with the dish veal Milanese.

Other dishes in Austrian cuisine before the Schnitzel that were breaded and deep-fried were known to exist, such as the Backhendl, first mentioned in a cookbook from 1719. The Schnitzel was then mentioned in the 19th century as Wiener Schnitzel analogically to the Backhendl.

In 1887, E. F. Knight wrote of a Wiener schnitzel ordered in a Rotterdam cafe, "as far as I could make out, the lowest layer of a Wienerschnitzel consists of juicy veal steaks and slices of lemon peel; the next layer is composed of sardines; then come sliced gherkins, capers, and diverse mysteries; a delicate sauce flavours the whole, and the result is a gastronomic dream."

== Preparation ==
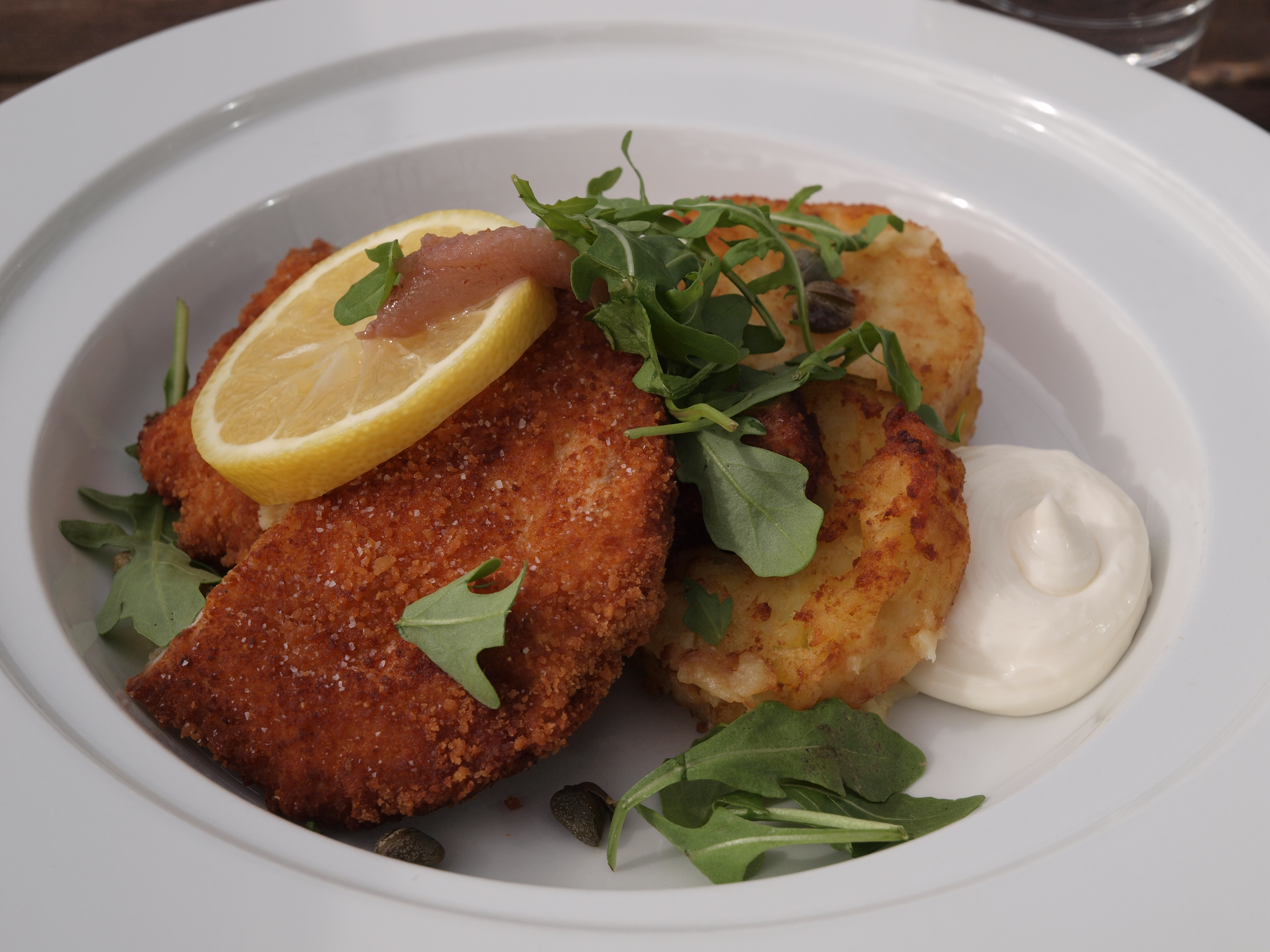
In the Nordic countries, Wiener schnitzel is typically also garnished with a slice of anchovy and capers.

The dish is prepared from butterfly-cut veal slices, about 4 mm (3/16 in) in thickness and lightly pounded flat, slightly salted, and rolled in flour, whipped eggs, and bread crumbs. The bread crumbs must not be pressed into the meat, so that they stay dry and can be "souffléd", enabling the breading to separate from the meat, giving the Schnitzel its characteristic light and puffy texture. Finally the Schnitzel is fried in lard or clarified butter at a temperature of 160–170 °C (320–340 °F) until it is golden yellow. The Schnitzel must swim in the fat or it will not cook evenly: the fat cools too much and intrudes into the bread crumbs, moistening them. During the frying the Schnitzel is repeatedly slightly tossed around the pan. Also during the frying, fat can be scooped from the pan with a spoon and poured onto the meat.

The dish was traditionally served in Austria with butterhead lettuce tossed with a sweetened vinaigrette dressing, optionally with chopped chives or onions, potato salad, cucumber salad, or parsley potatoes. In recent times french fries have become common.

In the early 20th century, the garnish consisted of capers and anchovies.

== Similar dishes ==
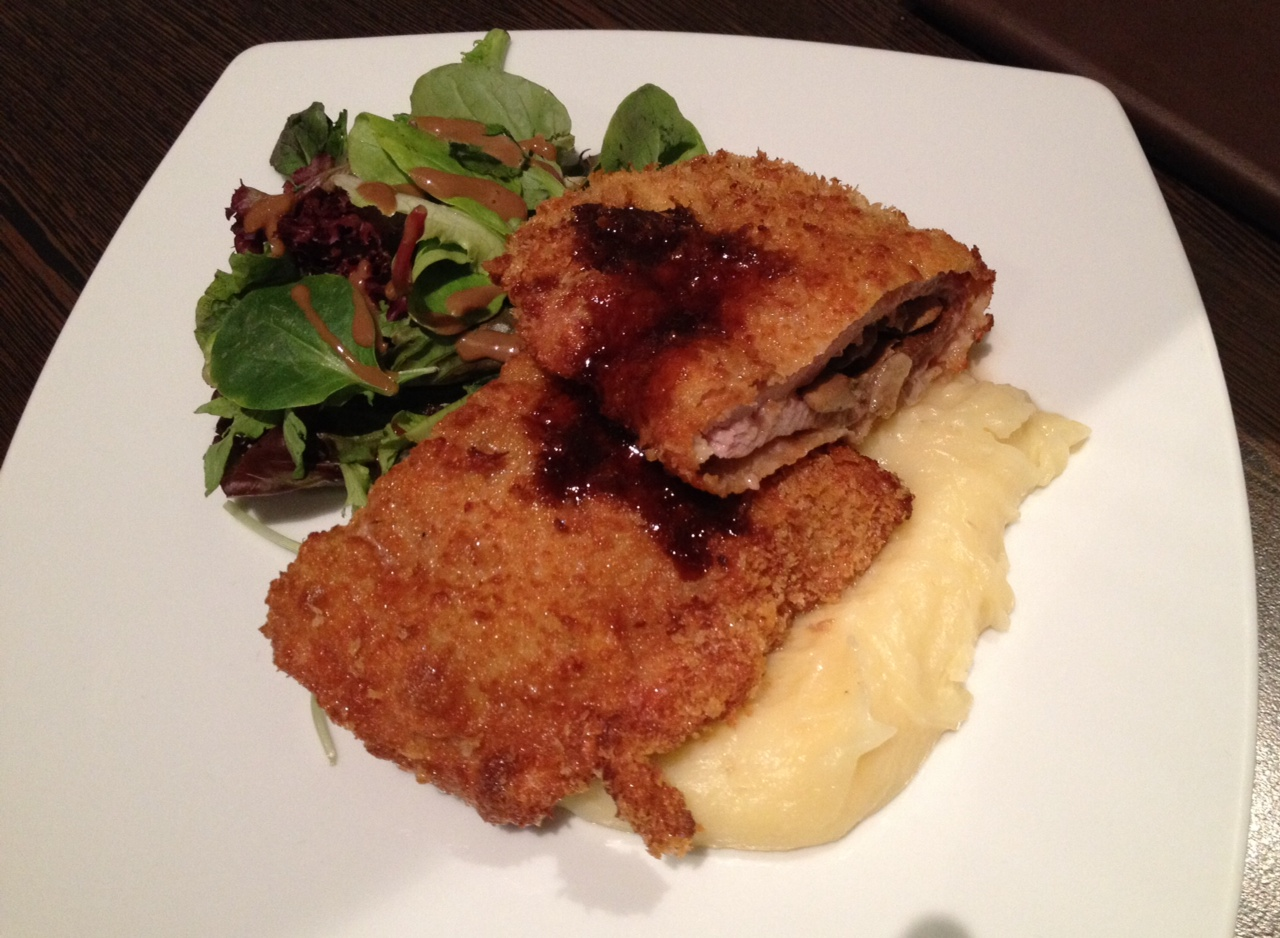
Pork schnitzel variation stuffed with fried mushrooms and onions (Fuhrmann Schnitzel vom Schwein), served with mashed potato and side salad

A popular variation is made with pork instead of veal, because pork is generally cheaper. To avoid confusion, Austrian law requires that Wiener Schnitzel be made of veal. A schnitzel made of pork can be called Wiener Schnitzel vom Schwein ('Wiener schnitzel from pork') or Schnitzel Wiener Art ('Viennese style schnitzel').

Similar dishes to Wiener schnitzel include Surschnitzel (from cured meat), and breaded turkey or chicken steaks. Similarly prepared dishes include cotoletta alla milanese, schnitzel cordon bleu filled with ham and cheese, and Pariser Schnitzel. The American chicken-fried steak is often said to be closely related to Wiener schnitzel, the result of the adaptation of the recipe by German or Austrian immigrants to the Texas Hill Country to locally available ingredients.

Tonkatsu is a similar fried pork cutlet from Japanese cuisine, thicker than its European counterparts.

Milanesa is a similar dish found in the Southern Cone, particularly in Argentina and Uruguay. It is often served with french fries or mashed potatoes.

In Israel, schnitzel is popular, first introduced by European Jews who immigrated to Israel during the middle decades of the twentieth century. Owing to food shortages at that time and the high cost of meat and veal, and due to kashrut laws that forbid eating pork, the local version was made of chicken breast, which was less expensive. Israeli schnitzel is still made of chicken. Kashrut laws also forbid using dairy products with meat, so kosher schnitzel is prepared with cooking oil. Schnitzel has become so common that it is regularly described as one of Israel's "national dishes."

== See also ==
- List of veal dishes
