= Michael Field (food writer) =

American food writer and critic

Field, on the cover of his 1970 book, All Manner of Food

Michael Field (February 21, 1915 – March 22, 1971) was an American food writer and critic. Earlier in his career he had been a concert pianist, but from 1964 until his death he concentrated on his work as an author and teacher of cooking.

== Early life and piano career ==
Field was born in New York City. His mother died when he was three years old, and he was raised by William Calhoun, a piano teacher, and his wife. Field said that the latter "got him interested in cooking". Field was educated in New York, first at the George Washington High School and then, on a scholarship, at the Juilliard School of Music. He said that he began cooking, while a student, to save money.

In 1943, Field formed a piano duo with Vera Appleton. They gave their first concert in December and, over the following 21 years, they gave numerous performances in the US and abroad. His obituary in The New York Times commented that their repertoire included the classics and premieres of new works. Their recordings range from 18th-century music, by composers such as Bach and Mozart, to 20th century works by Stravinsky, as well as popular arrangements of pieces by Johann Strauss.

== Cooking career and later years ==
In 1949, Field married Frances Fox, a painter and writer. Over the next decade, he grew increasingly interested in cuisine, and in 1958 he opened a cooking school in his house in Scarsdale, New York. He followed up his teaching experience with a book, Michael Field's Cooking School, and then another, Michael Field's Culinary Classics and Improvisations. According to The New York Times, "The latter was devoted to 18 classic dishes ranging from to beef in the English style to whole salmon, simmered. Each recipe was followed by several improvisational recipes for the leftovers, each a new gourmet creation in itself." Nora Ephron wrote in The New Yorker that by the mid-1960s Michael Field's Cooking School had become one of "the holy trinity" of American cookbooks, along with The New York Times Cook Book by Craig Claiborne and Mastering the Art of French Cooking by Simone Beck, Louisette Bertholle and Julia Child. He was known for his firm and sometimes unorthodox views, such as his insistence that it is not necessary to remove the veins from shrimps before cooking, or to wash mushrooms. He followed British cooking author Elizabeth David in outspoken disapproval of garlic presses, which they both regarded as making the extracted juice taste acrid.

Teaching and writing about food gradually supplanted music as Field's main career, and he gave his last concert in 1964. He moved his family to New York, where he held his cooking classes in his apartment. He died there of a heart attack in 1971, at the age of 56, leaving his widow and a 20-year-old son.

Cooking with Michael Field was posthumously published in 1978, and some of his books were in print long after his death, including All Manner of Food, originally published in 1970 and reissued in 1982.

== Sources ==
- David, Elizabeth (2001) [2000]. Is There a Nutmeg in the House?. Jill Norman (ed). London: Penguin. ISBN 978-0-14-029290-9.
