= À la Maréchale =

Food preparation method in French cuisine

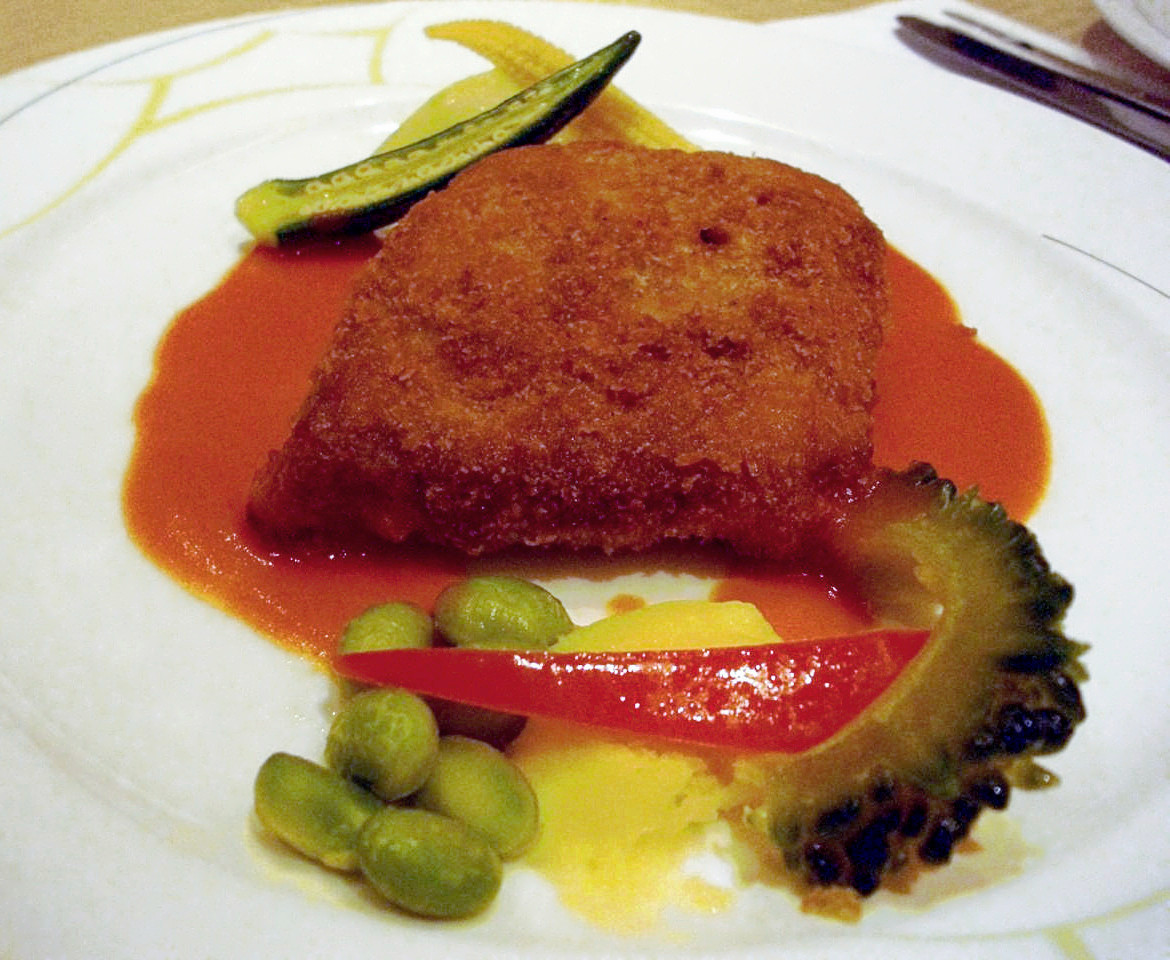
- Veal cutlet à la Maréchale
- Course: Main
- Place of origin: France
- Serving temperature: Hot
- Main ingredients: Meat or fish, eggs, bread crumbs

À la Maréchale (Note: French pronunciation: [a la maʁechal], lit. 'marshal-style') is a method of food preparation in haute cuisine. Dishes à la Maréchale are made from tender pieces of meat, such as cutlets, escalopes, supremes, sweetbreads, or fish, which are treated à l'anglaise (Note: French pronunciation: [a l‿ɑ̃glez], lit. 'English-style') (that is, coated with eggs and bread crumbs, and sautéed).

== History and varieties ==
The dish is known since the 18th century at least. It is speculated that it could be associated with the Maréchale de Luxembourg (1707-1787), the wife of Charles-François-Frédéric de Montmorency-Luxembourg (1702–1764) and a major society hostess. According to food historian William Pokhlyobkin, the dish had to be so tender that "even a marshal (a synonym of an elder, satiated and toothless man) could eat it."

Numerous varieties of such dishes are described in 19th-century cookbooks. Various sorts of meat, poultry and fish prepared à la Maréchale are found in, for example, works by André Viard, Antoine Beauvilliers, Louis Eustache Ude, Marie-Antoine Carême, Jules Gouffé, Alexis Soyer, Charles Elmé Francatelli, Urbain Dubois and Charles Ranhofer. Some books included stuffed versions, such as "rabbit à la Maréchale" filled with duxelles and "fowl fillet à la Maréchale" stuffed with truffles and herbs or with herbs and forcemeat.

After the victory over Napoleon in 1814, dishes à la Maréchale were introduced to Russia. Rather elaborate varieties, usually involving hazel grouse fillets, are found in several classical Russian cookbooks. One of the first such books, The Last Work by Gerasim Stepanov, proposes to combine hazel grouse fillets and veal liver. Elena Molokhovets' A Gift to Young Housewives, the most successful Russian cookbook of the 19th century, has included since its first edition in 1861 a recipe for "hazel grouse à la Maréchale" stuffed with Madeira sauce with portobello mushrooms and truffles. A similar variety of "game cutlets à la Maréchale" with a quenelle and truffle stuffing is described in the textbook The Practical Fundamentals of the Cookery Art by Pelageya Alexandrova-Ignatieva published in the beginning of the 20th century.

In the Soviet times, the book Apportionments for dinners, separate dishes and other products of public catering (1928), which served as a standard reference for Soviet catering establishments, demanded renaming of many traditional restaurant dishes to replace the (mostly French-style) "bourgeoise" names with simple "proletarian" forms. This program was not realised immediately (at least not completely), and its successor, The Directory of Apportionments for Catering (1940), published by the Soviet Ministry of Food Industry, still included chicken and game fillets à la Maréchale stuffed with milk sauce and portobello mushrooms. The major Soviet cookbooks published after WWII, such as Cookery (1955) or Directory of Recipes and Culinary Products for Catering, included the same recipe but named it simply "chicken or game cutlet stuffed with milk sauce" and added a similar "chicken or game cutlet stuffed with liver". As a result, the term à la Maréchale disappeared from menus of Soviet restaurants.

August Escoffier notes in Le Guide Culinaire that the commonly used "English-style" coating in these dishes is an economical substitute for the original treatment with chopped truffles. While suprême de volaille and cervelle de veau are prepared this way, other dishes à la Maréchale in his guide, such as tournedos and foie gras collops, include truffles. A garnish of truffles and green asparagus tips is nowadays common for dishes à la Maréchale.

== Cultural references ==
Dishes à la Maréchale are occasionally mentioned in Russian literature as a prime example of an "aristocratic" dish of high-level cuisine. In Anton Chekhov's story "Peasants", Nikolay Tchikildyeev, a former hotel waiter, and a cook discussed

...the dishes that were prepared in the old days for the gentry. They talked of rissoles, cutlets, various soups and sauces, and the cook, who remembered everything very well, mentioned dishes that are no longer served. There was one, for instance -- a dish made of bulls' eyes, which was called "waking up in the morning." "And used you to do cutlets à la maréchal?" asked Nikolay. "No." Nikolay shook his head reproachfully and said: "Tut, tut! You were not much of a cook!"

In his mémoires, Alexander Martynov, a colonel of the Russian tsarist secret police Okhranka, recalls anarchist revolutionary Dmitry Bogrov's assassination of the Russian prime minister Pyotr Stolypin in 1911. A year before, Bogrov wrote a phrase in a letter, which later became frequently cited, that he had "no interest in life. Nothing except an endless row of cutlets to be eaten." "In reality", Martynov commented, "the meaning of life for Bogrov was that these cutlets should be à la Maréchale."

== Related dishes ==
Alexandrova-Ignatieva noted that côtelette de volaille (the precursor of chicken Kiev) is prepared like game cutlets à la Maréchale, with chicken used instead of hazel grouse. The same is stated in another Russian cookbook published at the same time which gives basically the same recipes for côtelette de volaille and côtelette à la Maréchale and notes that the only difference between them is that the former are made of chicken while the latter are made of game, such as grouse, blackcock, etc.

== See also ==
- Breaded cutlet
- Cachopo
- Cordon bleu
- Karađorđeva šnicla

== Sources ==
- Пелагея Павловна Александрова-Игнатьева (1909). Практические основы кулинарного искусства. Санкт-Петербург. [Pelageya Alexandrova-Ignatieva (1909). The Practical Fundamentals of the Cookery Art (in Russian). St. Petersburg.]
- Продуктовые нормы обедов, отдельных блюд и прочих изделий общественных столовых (раскладки). Москва: паевое товарищество "Нарпит". 1928. [Ration standards (apportionments) for dinners, separate dishes and other products of public catering (in Russian). Moscow: Narpit (state organisation for public catering). 1928.]
- Научно-исследовательский институт торговли и общественного питания (1940). Сборник раскладок для предприятий общественного питания. Москва: Госторгиздат. [Research Institute of Trade and Catering of the Ministry of Trade of the USSR (1940). Directory of Apportionments for Catering (in Russian). Moscow: Gostorgizdat (publishing house of the State Ministry of Trade).]
- Antoine Beauvilliers (1814). L'art du cuisinier (in French). Vol. 1. Paris: Pilet. [English translation: Antoine Beauvilliers (1827). The Art of French Cookery. Longman.]
- Marie Antonin Carême; Armand Plumerey; Charles Frédéric Alfred Fayot (1847). L'art de la cuisine française au dix-neuviême siêcle: traité élémentaire et pratique (in French). Vol. 4. Entrées chaudes. Work completed after Carême's death by Armand Plumerey.
- Антон Павлович Чехов (1897). Мужики (in Russian). [Anton Chekhov (1897). Peasants. Translated by Constance Garnett.]
- Jim Chevallier (2009). Apres Moi, Le Dessert. Vol. 2. Chez Jim. ISBN 978-1-44148-954-8.
- Кулинария. Москва: Госторгиздат. 1955. [Cookery (in Russian). Moscow: Gostorgizdat (publishing house of the State Ministry of Trade). 1955–58.]
- Научно-исследовательский институт торговли и общественного питания (1980). Сборник рецептур блюд и кулинарных изделий для предприятий общественного питания. Москва: Госторгиздат. [Research Institute of Trade and Catering of the Ministry of Trade of the USSR (1980). Directory of Recipes and Coolinary Products for Catering (in Russian). Moscow: Gostorgizdat (publishing house of the State Ministry of Trade).]
- Urbain Dubois (1868). La cuisine classique: études pratiques, raisonnées et démonstratives de l'Ecole française appliquée au service à la russe (in French) (3 ed.). E. Dentu.
- Auguste Escoffier (1907). A Guide to Modern Cookery. London: W. Heinemann.
- Charles Elmé Francatelli (1859). The Modern Cook. reprinted by Applewood Books, 2008. ISBN 978-1-4290-1210-2.
- Jules Gouffé (1867). Le livre de cuisine (in French). [English translation: Jules Gouffé (1869). The royal cookery book. Low & Marston.]
- Alexander Martynov (1972) [1938]. My Service in the Special Corps of Gendarmes. Stanford: Hoover Institution Press.
- Н. Н. Маслов (1911). Кулинар. Санкт-Петербург: В. И. Губинский. [N. N. Maslov (1911). The Cook (in Russian). St. Petersburg: V. I. Gubinsky.]
- Елена Молоховец (1861). Подарок молодым хозяйкам (in Russian). Санкт-Петербург. A Gift to Young Housewives, English translation: Joyce Stetson Toomre (1998). Classic Russian Cooking: Elena Molokhovets' a Gift to Young Housewives. Indiana University Press. ISBN 978-0-253-21210-8.
- Prosper Montagné (1938). Larousse Gastronomique (in French). Paris: Librarie Larousse.
- А. Мушин (1914). Дмитрий Богров и убийство Столыпина. Париж. p. 123. [A. Mushin (1914). Dmitry Bogrov and the murder of Stolypin (in Russian). Paris. p. 123.]
- Вильям Похлебкин (2006). Кулинарный словарь. Москва: Центрполиграф. ISBN 5-227-00460-9. [William Pokhlyobkin (2006). Dictionary of Cookery (in Russian). Moscow: Centrpoligraf.]
- Charles Ranhofer (1894). The Epicurean, a Complete Treatise of Analytical and Practical Studies on the Culinary Art.
- Edward Renold; David Foskett; John Fuller (2012). Chef's Compendium of Professional Recipes. Routledge. ISBN 978-1-136-07862-0.
- Soyer, Alexis (1849). The Gastronomic Regeneration: A Simplified and Entirely New System of Cookery with Nearly Two Thousand Practical Receipts. Simpkin, Marshall & Company.
- Герасим Степанов (1851). Последний труд слепца-старца Герасима Степанова. Москва. [Gerasim Stepanov (1851). The last work (in Russian). Moscow.]
- "Maréchale (à la)". La glosssaire des termes de cuisine (in French). Supertoinette.com.
- Louis Eustache Ude (1815). The French Cook, Or, The Art of Cookery: Developed in All Its Branches. Published by the author.
- André Viard (1806). Le Cuisinier Impérial. Paris: J.-N. Barba.
