= Croquembouche =

French dessert

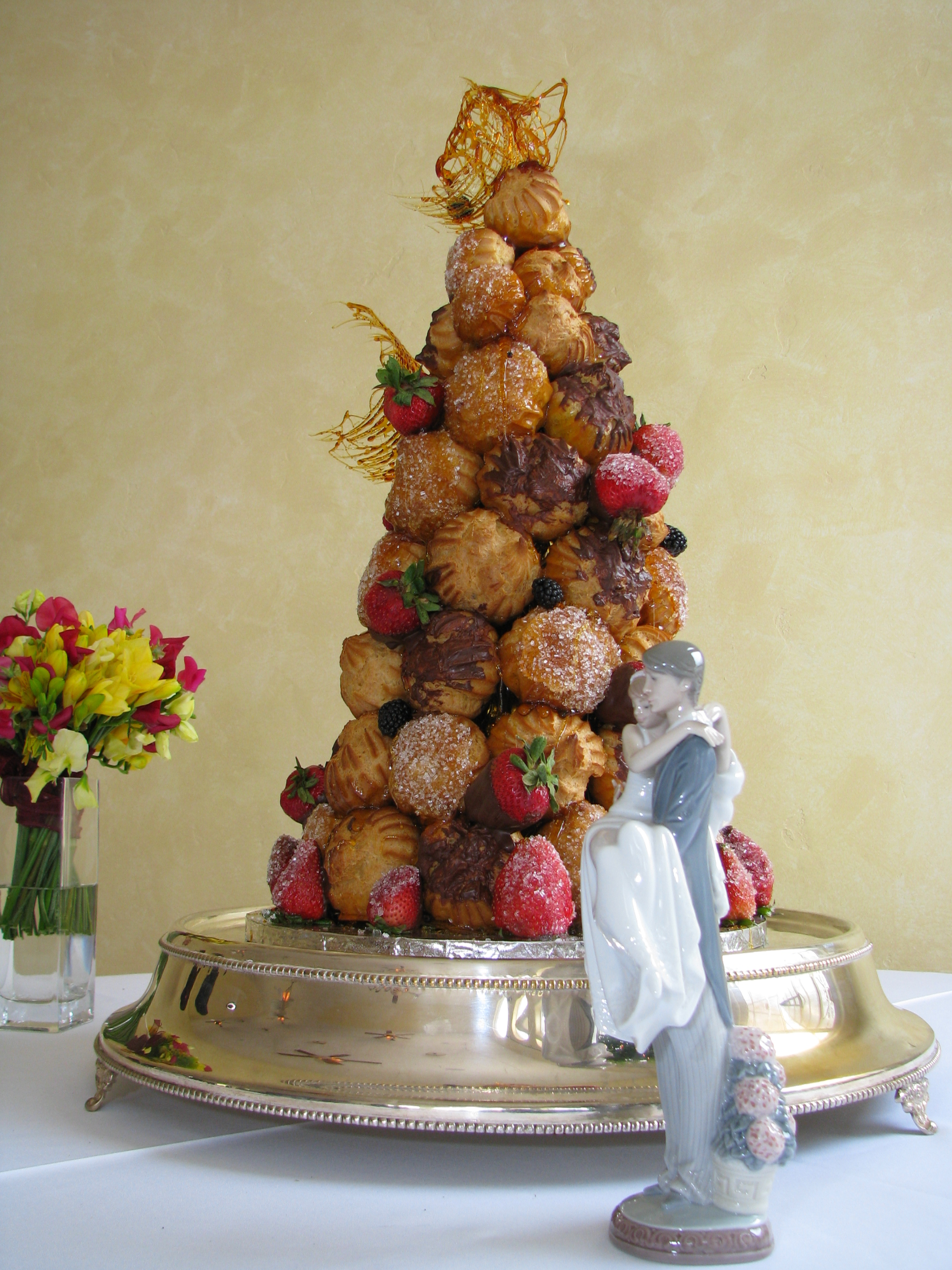
- Croquembouche wedding cake
- Alternative names: Croque-en-bouche, pièce-en-Montée
- Type: Choux pastry
- Course: Dessert
- Place of origin: France
- Main ingredients: Profiteroles, caramel

A croquembouche (French: [kʁɔ.kɑ̃.buʃ]) or croque-en-bouche is a French dessert consisting of choux pastry puffs piled into a cone and bound with threads of caramel. In Italy and France, it is often served at weddings, baptisms and First Communions.

== Etymology ==
The name comes from the French phrase croque en bouche, meaning '[something that] crunches in the mouth'.

== Presentation ==
A croquembouche is composed of (usually cream-filled) choux piled into a cone and bound with spun sugar. It may also be decorated with other confectionery, such as sugared almonds, chocolate, and edible flowers. Sometimes it is covered in macarons or ganache.

== History ==
The invention of the croquembouche is often attributed to Antonin Carême, who includes it in his 1815 cookbook Le Pâtissier royal parisien, but it is mentioned as early as 1806, in André Viard's culinary encyclopedia Le Cuisinier Impérial, and Antoine Beauvilliers' 1815 L'Art du Cuisinier. In Viard's encyclopedia and other early texts (e.g., Néo-physiologie du goût), it is included in lists of entremets—elaborate dishes, both savory and sweet, that were served between courses during large banquets.

== Records ==
On 6 March 2009, alumni of the Pune-based Maharashtra State Institute of Hotel Management and Catering Technology entered the Limca Book of Records after creating India's biggest croquembouche. It was recorded as 15 ft (4.5 m) tall.

== See also ==
- List of French desserts
- List of choux pastry dishes
- List of pastries
