= Cordon bleu (dish) =

Meat and cheese dish

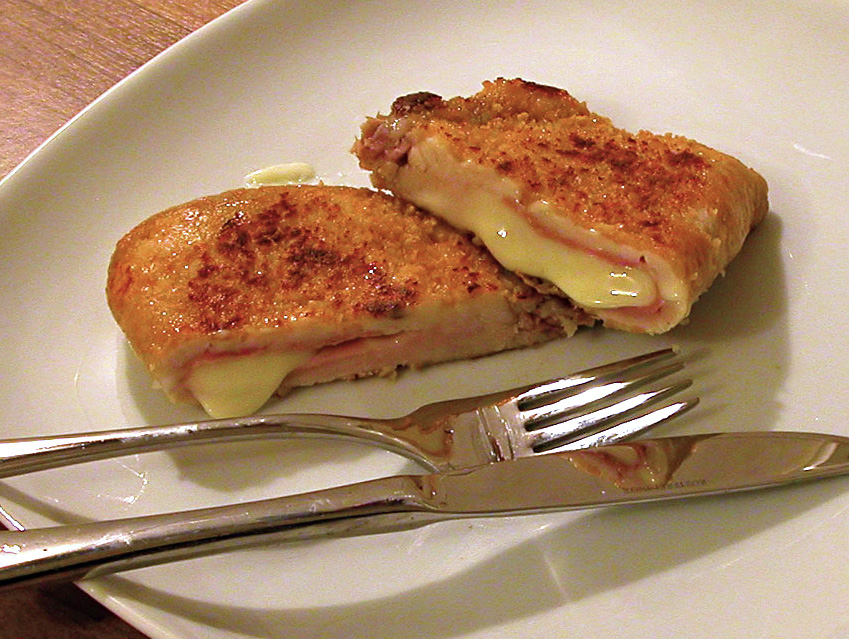
- A chicken cordon bleu
- Place of origin: Switzerland
- Main ingredients: Veal or chicken breast, cheese, ham, honey mustard, bread crumbs

A cordon bleu consists of a thin cutlet of meat (typically veal, chicken, or pork) that is pounded thin, stuffed with ham and cheese, rolled, then breaded and pan-fried or deep-fried. Veal cordon bleu is the traditional version, while chicken cordon bleu is the most popular modern variant.

== Name ==
The French term cordon bleu is translated as "blue ribbon". According to Larousse Gastronomique, the cordon bleu "was originally a wide blue ribbon worn by members of the highest order of knighthood, L'Ordre des chevaliers du Saint-Esprit, instituted by Henri III of France in 1578. By extension, the term has since been applied to food preparation to a very high standard and by outstanding cooks. The analogy no doubt arose from the similarity between the sash worn by the knights and the ribbons (generally blue) of a cook's apron."

== History ==
The exact origin of cordon bleu is unclear. The most accepted theory is that a female Valaisian cook in Switzerland created the recipe out of necessity to serve a large number of guests in one shift. However, its origin can also be traced back to a cooking competition in France in 1930, where the winning dish was named "le Cordon Bleu".

Another theory suggests that a Swiss cook prepared a dish on the SS Bremen in 1933 to celebrate the achievement of a new record. Having just won a blue ribbon for his new record, the captain decided to ask the cook for a new dish: the cordon bleu, which the cook may have brought back from France or Switzerland.

The cordon bleu was first mentioned in a cookbook from 1949. The earliest reference to "veal Cordon Bleu" is in the Los Angeles Times in 1958, while similar veal recipes are found from at least 1955.

== Variants ==
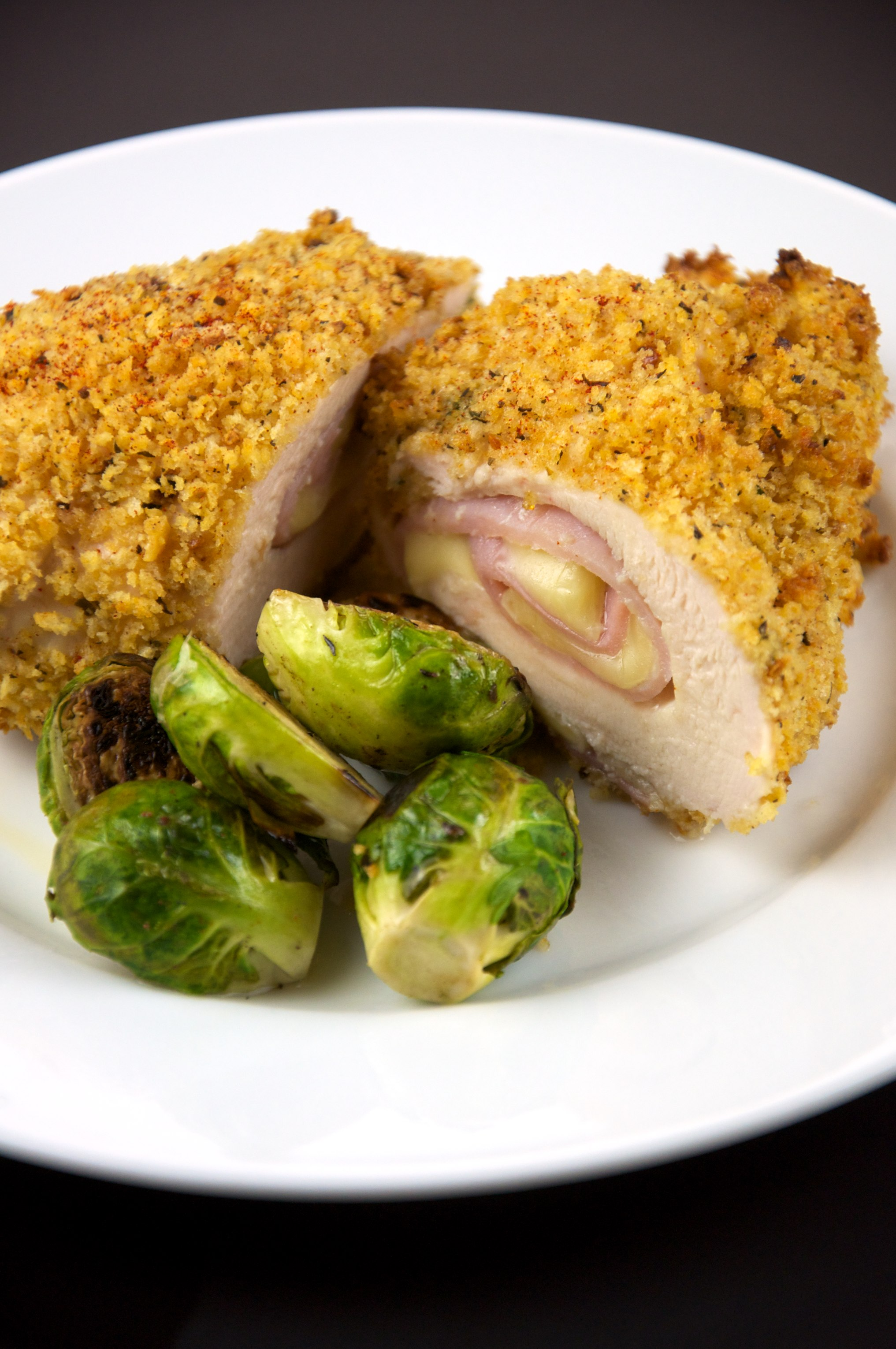
Chicken cordon bleu with roasted Brussels sprouts

There are many variations of the recipe involving cutlet, cheese, and meat. A popular way to prepare chicken cordon bleu is to butterfly a chicken breast, place a thin slice of ham inside, along with a thin slice of a soft, easily melted cheese. The chicken breast is then rolled into a roulade, coated in bread crumbs, and then deep-fried. Other variations exist with the chicken baked rather than fried.

Other common variations include omitting the bread crumbs, wrapping the ham around the chicken, or using bacon in place of ham.

A similar dish popular in the Asturias province of Spain is cachopo, a deep-fried cutlet of veal, beef or chicken wrapped around a filling of Serrano ham and cheese. In Spain, a version made usually with just two slices of ham and cheese, although it can also be found with chicken or pork loin added, is often called san jacobo.

A common variant in Uruguay and Argentina is the milanesa rellena. It consists of two beef or chicken fillets passed through beaten egg, later, stuffed with cooked ham and mozzarella cheese and superimposed like a sandwich. Once this is done, they are again passed through beaten eggs and breadcrumbs, to be fried or baked. It is usually served with papas fritas (french fries) as a garnish.

In Muslim-majority countries, halal versions of cordon bleu are popular, with beef or mutton replacing ham.

== See also ==
- Breaded cutlet
- Culinary Heritage of Switzerland
- Chicken Kiev
- Dishes à la Maréchale
- Double Down (sandwich)
- Karađorđeva šnicla
- List of stuffed dishes
