= Supreme (cooking) =

Culinary term referring to the best part of the food

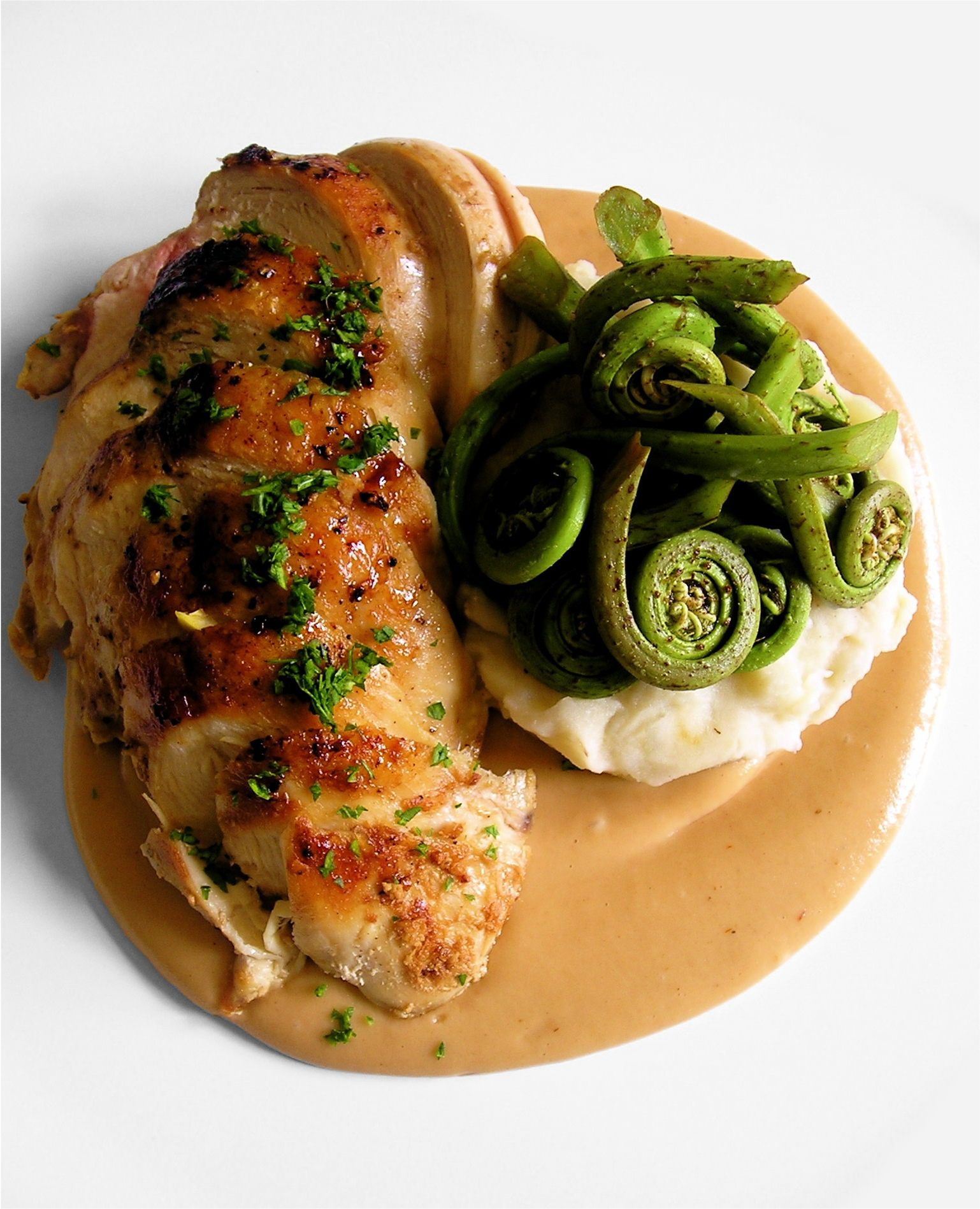
Chicken supreme with sauce suprême, along with a side dish

The term supreme (also spelled suprême) used in cooking and culinary arts refers to the best part of the food. For poultry, game and fish dishes, supreme denotes a fillet.

== Chicken ==
In professional cookery, the term "chicken supreme" (French: suprême de volaille) is used to describe a boneless, skin-on breast of chicken. If the humerus bone of the wing remains attached, the cut is called "chicken cutlet" (côtelette de volaille). The same cut is used for duck (suprême de canard) and other birds.

Chicken supremes can be prepared in many ways. For example, supremes à la Maréchale are treated à l'anglaise ("English-style"), i.e. coated with eggs and breadcrumbs, and sautéed. A supreme can be minced, resulting in such dishes as suprême de volaille Pojarski. There are also various versions with stuffing. A popular variety is suprême de volaille à la Kiev, commonly known as chicken Kiev, for which chicken supremes are stuffed with butter.

== Fruit ==
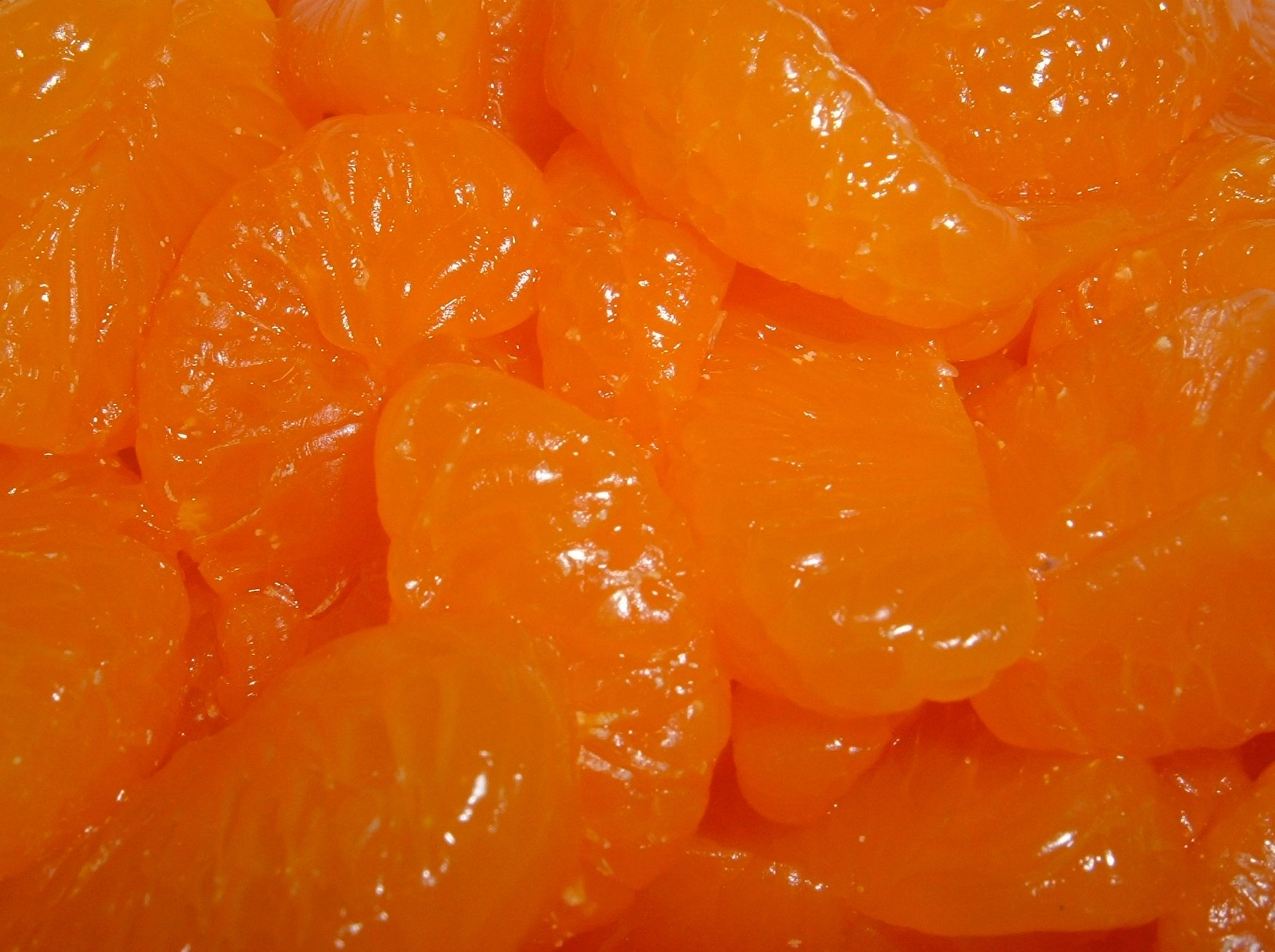
Canned mandarin oranges that have been supremed in their processing

To supreme a citrus fruit is to remove the skin, pith, membranes, and seeds, and to separate its segments. Used as a noun, a supreme can be a wedge of citrus fruit prepared in this way.

== Sauce ==
Suprême sauce (sauce suprême) is a rich white sauce made of chicken stock and cream. This sauce is often served with chicken dishes.

The term "supreme" is also used for a dish dressed with a suprême sauce (e.g. a suprême of barracuda).

== Other cooking uses ==
Supreme can also be used as a term in cookery in the following ways:

- A tall sorbet glass
- A dessert served in a supreme

== See also ==
- List of cooking techniques
