= Cachopo (dish) =

Veal dish from Asturias, Spain

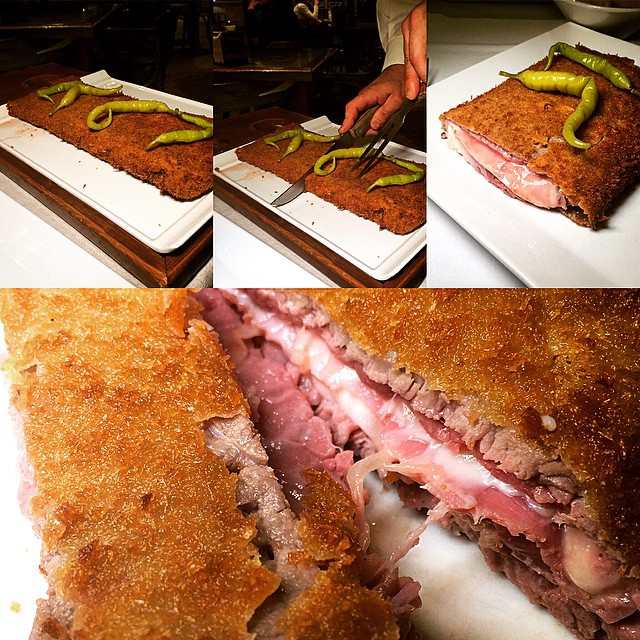
- Cachopo with peppers (above) and cachopo cut open (below)
- Place of origin: Asturian
- Main ingredients: Veal with cheese, ham, bread crumbs

Cachopo is a dish characteristic of Asturian cuisine. It consists of two large veal fillets, with Serrano ham slices and cheese in between, and typically has a side of chips (known there as patatas fritas). The dish is eaten fried and hot after being breaded in flour, eggs and breadcrumbs, and it is usually served garnished with potatoes, peppers, or mushrooms.

The first evidence of the cachopo dish is from doctor Gaspar Casal, in the early eighteenth century.

There are multiple variations of this dish, including fish cachopos, and chicken or pork cachopos stuffed with seafood, meat, mushrooms, cheese, or vegetables.

== See also ==
- Cordon bleu (dish)
- Karađorđeva šnicla
- Dishes à la Maréchale
- Chicken Kiev
- Breaded cutlet
- Schnitzel
- List of stuffed dishes
