= Karađorđeva šnicla =

Serbian breaded cutlet

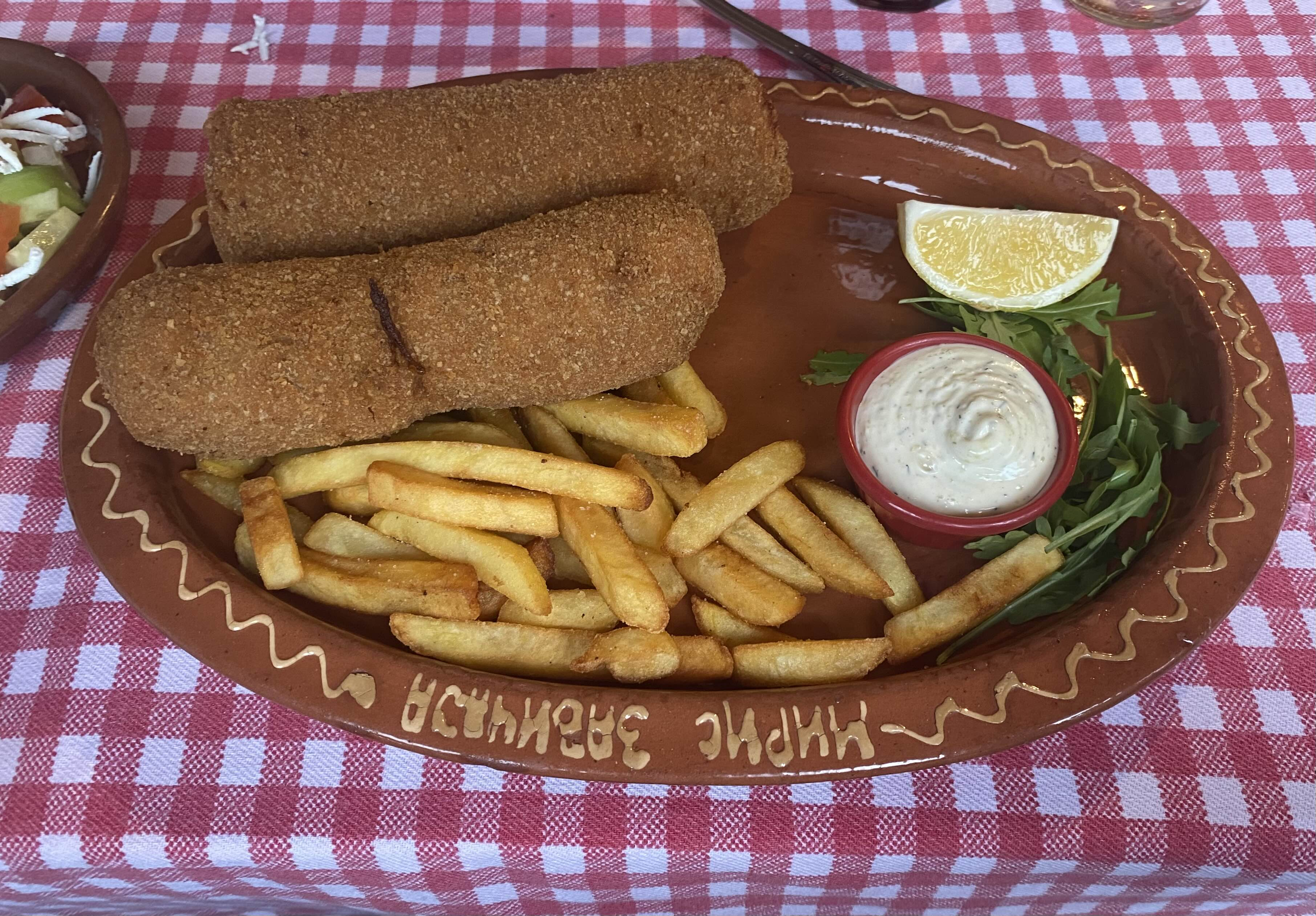
- Karađorđeva šnicla with fries, tartar sauce, and a slice of lemon
- Place of origin: Serbia
- Associated cuisine: Serbian
- Created by: Mića Stojanović
- Main ingredients: Rolled veal, pork, or chicken steak, kaymak, bread crumbs

Karađorđeva šnicla (English: Karađorđe's schnitzel, Serbian: Карађорђева шницла) is a breaded cutlet dish named after the Serbian revolutionary Karađorđe. The dish consists of a rolled veal, pork, or chicken steak, stuffed with kaymak, which is then breaded and fried. It is served with tartar sauce and a slice of lemon on the side, and sometimes french fries or steamed vegetables. Created by Josip Broz Tito's chef Mića Stojanović in 1956 or 1957 as an improvisation of chicken Kiev, it has become a regular staple in Serbian cuisine. Stojanović unsuccessfully tried to patent his original recipe, which has since been adapted to several variations.

== History ==
Karađorđeva šnicla was created by Mića Stojanović, a retired cooking professor, former head chef at InterContinental Belgrade, and personal chef for Yugoslav president Josip Broz Tito. Born in a village in the central Serbian region of Gruža in 1935, Stojanović lost both of his parents in the Kragujevac massacre of October 1941, and was later moved to an orphanage. As a teenager, he enrolled in a culinary school. He has come up with around 200 recipes over the course of his career, many of which were named after figures and locations from Serbian history. According to Stojanović, he first prepared Karađorđeva šnicla in 1956 or 1957, after receiving an order for Chicken Kiev while working at the Golf Restaurant in the Belgrade suburb of Košutnjak. Lacking butter and chicken, Stojanović decided to make a cutlet from veal and kaymak, a creamy dairy product similar to clotted cream. He finished by pouring tartar sauce over it and garnishing it with a lemon slice. He later discovered that the guest was Tito's sister-in-law Tamara Broz, who was pleased with the result. That year, Stojanović was invited to join Tito's kitchen staff, and later became the statesman's personal chef—a position he held until Tito's death in 1980.

Stojanović originally titled the creation Schnitzel Karađorđe (Šnicla Karađorđe). The breaded cutlet is named after Serbian revolutionary Karađorđe, who was born in the region of Šumadija, where kaymak was mass-produced at the time. Stojanović later presented his work, which he had renamed Karađorđeva šnicla, at a Belgrade food competition in 1967. In English, it is translated to either Karađorđe's schnitzel, Karađorđe's steak, or Black George's schnitzel. He said that another reason behind naming it after Karađorđe was due to the House of Karađorđević being well-known internationally. Stojanović, however, dismissed the idea that Karađorđeva šnicla might be a monarchistic creation, because Karađorđe was not censored in the Socialist Federal Republic of Yugoslavia, due to his revolutionary and freedom-fighting status. The dish is sometimes colloquially referred to as the Maidens' Dream (devojački san) because of its phallic shape.

Stojanović attempted to patent the recipe, which has changed throughout time and in different locations. He has fought to protect his original recipe as other restaurants added other ingredients, such as ham, pickles, peppers, and kashkaval. The Intellectual Property Office rejected his patenting attempts, stating that there were no legal grounds to patent the creation. In the 1990s, he established a restaurant in Zemun where his family has since prepared the breaded cutlet using the classic method. He has supported the use of non-veal meats in Karađorđeva šnicla, citing religious or cultural restrictions.

== Preparation ==
The primary ingredients of Karađorđeva šnicla include steak, breadcrumbs, flour, oil, and eggs, while stuffing often includes kaymak. According to the classic recipe, the steak is pestled into a rectangle form, filled with kaymak, and then rolled into flour and eggs. The mixture is then rolled in breadcrumbs and fried for 8 to 15 minutes. The steak can be made from veal, pork, or chicken. Stojanović said that Karađorđeva šnicla is typically served with mayonnaise or tartar sauce and a slice of lemon, representing the Order of Karađorđe Star. French fries, red pepper, green beans, or steamed vegetables are also used as side dishes, while white wine was recommended by Stojanović as a drink.

The Swiss cordon bleu has been compared as having similar preparation to Karađorđeva šnicla. In response to Voki Kostić's claim that Karađorđeva šnicla is a copy of cordon bleu, the Belgrade Hospitality and Tourism School disputed his claim, citing differences in stuffing. Bojana Kalenjuk Pivarski, a professor at the Department of Gastronomy at the Faculty of Sciences of the University of Novi Sad, similarly criticised the comparison of Karađorđeva šnicla to other dishes that are similar in preparation, such as chicken Kiev, due to its specific shape and stuffing characteristics, such as the use of kaymak.

=== Variations ===
A Kurir recipe additionally lists onions as an ingredient and black pepper and Vegeta as condiments. According to them, breadcrumbs are first mixed with meat and other ingredients, excluding flour and oil, then shaped into a rectangle. Cheese, prosciutto, and kaymak are then added as a filling to the mixture, which is subsequently fried in oil. Another variation includes potatoes as a replacement for a steak. In this variation, potatoes are blended with eggs, flour, breadcrumbs, and stewed onions before being spread in the shape of a patty. Kaymak is then applied to the mixture and rolled, before being combined with breadcrumbs and eggs and fried.

Stojanović's son has claimed that the Zagreb steak (Zagrebački odrezak), made in Croatia, and the Ljubljana schnitzel, made in Slovenia, are variations of Karađorđeva šnicla. The Zagreb steak is more commonly associated with the Wiener schnitzel and the cordon bleu, as it is filled with ham and cheese rather than kaymak.

== In culture ==
Karađorđeva šnicla has become a regular staple of Serbian cuisine and is a frequent feature in the country's restaurants. The breaded cutlet has gained international recognition and has been featured in restaurants in New York City, Uganda, Singapore, and Japan. Kalenjuk Pivarski said that "no [Serbian] dish created some 50, 60 years ago has such popularity" (nijedno jelo nastalo pre nekih 50, 60 godina nema takvu popularnost) as Karađorđeva šnicla. The dish is served in the University of Novi Sad and University of Belgrade student canteens.

== See also ==
- Cachopo (dish)
- Dishes à la Maréchale
- List of stuffed dishes
