= Chicken Kiev =

Chicken dish associated with Russian and Ukrainian cuisines

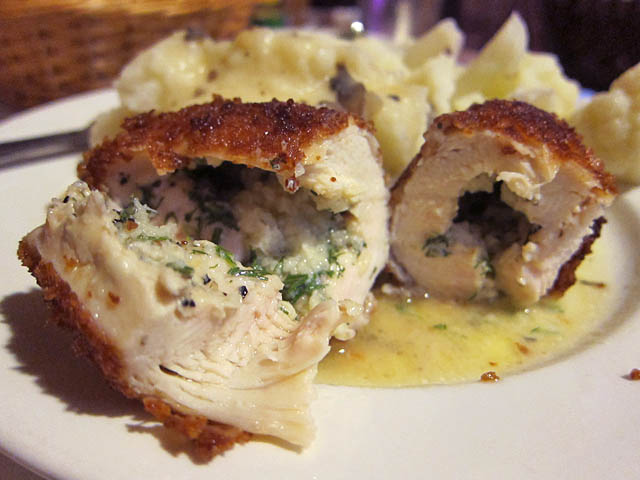
- Chicken Kiev cut open
- Alternative names: Chicken Kyiv, côtelette de volaille, suprême de volaille à la Kiev
- Course: Main
- Place of origin: Russian Empire
- Associated cuisine: Russian, Ukrainian
- Serving temperature: Hot
- Main ingredients: Chicken breast, (garlic) butter, herbs, eggs, bread crumbs

Chicken Kiev, (Note: Ukrainian: котлета по-київськи, romanized: kotleta po-kyivsky, pronounced [kotˈlɛtɐ po ˈkɪjiu̯sʲke]; Russian: котлета по-киевски, romanized: kotleta po-kiyevski.) also known as chicken Kyiv, (Note: In response to the 2022 Russian invasion of Ukraine, some supermarket chains rebranded their versions of the dish to the spelling "chicken Kyiv", in line with the general media shift from the Russian-derived name "Kiev" to "Kyiv".) is a dish made of chicken fillet pounded and rolled around cold butter, then coated with egg and bread crumbs, and either fried or baked. Since fillets are often referred to as suprêmes in professional cookery, the dish is also called "suprême de volaille à la Kiev". Stuffed chicken breast is generally known in Russian and Ukrainian cuisines as côtelette de volaille. Though it has disputed origins, the dish is particularly popular in the post-Soviet states, as well as in several other countries of the former Eastern Bloc, and in the English-speaking world.

== History ==
The history of this dish is not well documented, and various sources make claims about its origin. Since the 18th century, Russian chefs have adopted many techniques of French haute cuisine and combined them with the local culinary tradition. The adoption was furthered by the French chefs, such as Marie-Antoine Carême and Urbain Dubois, who were hired by Russian gentry. In particular, the use of high quality meat cuts, such as various cutlets, steaks, escalopes and suprêmes became widespread in the 19th century, and a number of original dishes involving such components were developed in Russia at that time.

=== Côtelette de volaille ===
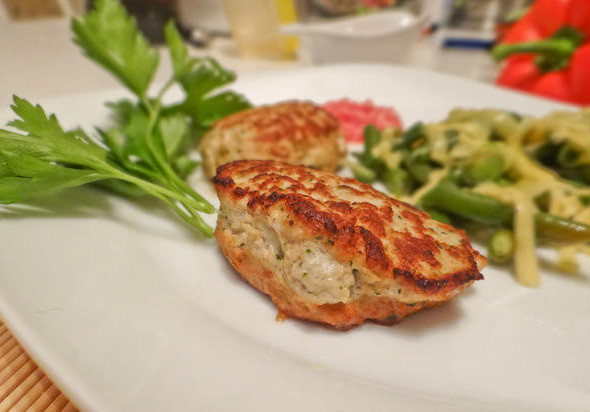
Common Russian minced chicken cutlets

The French term de volaille means "of poultry" and denotes almost exclusively chicken dishes in French cookbooks. The name côtelette de volaille means thus simply "chicken cutlet". Despite the original French name, the Russian recipe is unknown in French cuisine, where the term côtelette de volaille refers to chicken breasts in general and is used nearly synonymously with chicken filet or suprême. The French term also denotes a minced chicken cutlet-shaped patty. The general Russian term for chicken cutlets, kurinaya kotleta (куриная котлета), refers predominantly to such minced cutlets, whereas kotleta de-voliay (котлета деволяй) is applied exclusively to the stuffed chicken breast dish. The latter name appears in the pre- and post-revolutionary Russian literature (in cookbooks as well as in fiction) since the beginning of the 20th century and is usually mentioned as a common restaurant dish.

The recipe in the classical Russian cookery textbook The Practical Fundamentals of the Cookery Art by Pelageya Alexandrova-Ignatieva (which had eleven editions between 1899 and 1916) includes a complex stuffing similar to quenelle (a mixture of minced meat, in this case the rest of the meat of the chicken, and cream) but with butter added. It also points out that "the cutlets de volaille are made from whole chicken fillets, like the game cutlets à la Maréchale". The recipe is preceded by a similar one for "hazel grouse cutlets à la Maréchale" with a quenelle and truffle stuffing. Another Russian cookbook published at the same time gives basically identical recipes for côtelette de volaille and côtelette à la Maréchale and notes that the only difference between them is that the former are made of chicken while the latter are made of game, such as hazel grouse, blackcock, etc.

The term à la Maréchale ("marshal-style") denotes in French cookery tender pieces of meat, such as cutlets, escalopes, sweetbreads, or chicken breasts, which are treated à l'anglaise ("English-style"), i.e. coated with egg and breadcrumbs, and sautéed. Numerous recipes of such dishes, some of them with stuffings, are described in both Western and Russian cookbooks of the 19th century. Among the stuffed versions, one finds a recipe for a "fowl fillet à la Maréchale" stuffed with truffles and herbs in The Art of French Cuisine of the 19th Century (1847) by Marie-Antoine Carême, and a similar filet de poulets à la Maréchale with herbs and forcemeat in La cuisine classique (1868) by Urbain Dubois. Elena Molokhovets' A Gift to Young Housewives, the most successful Russian cookbook of the 19th century, has included since its first edition in 1861 an elaborate recipe for "hazel grouse à la Maréchale" stuffed with Madeira sauce, portobello mushrooms and truffles.

=== Pozharsky cutlet ===
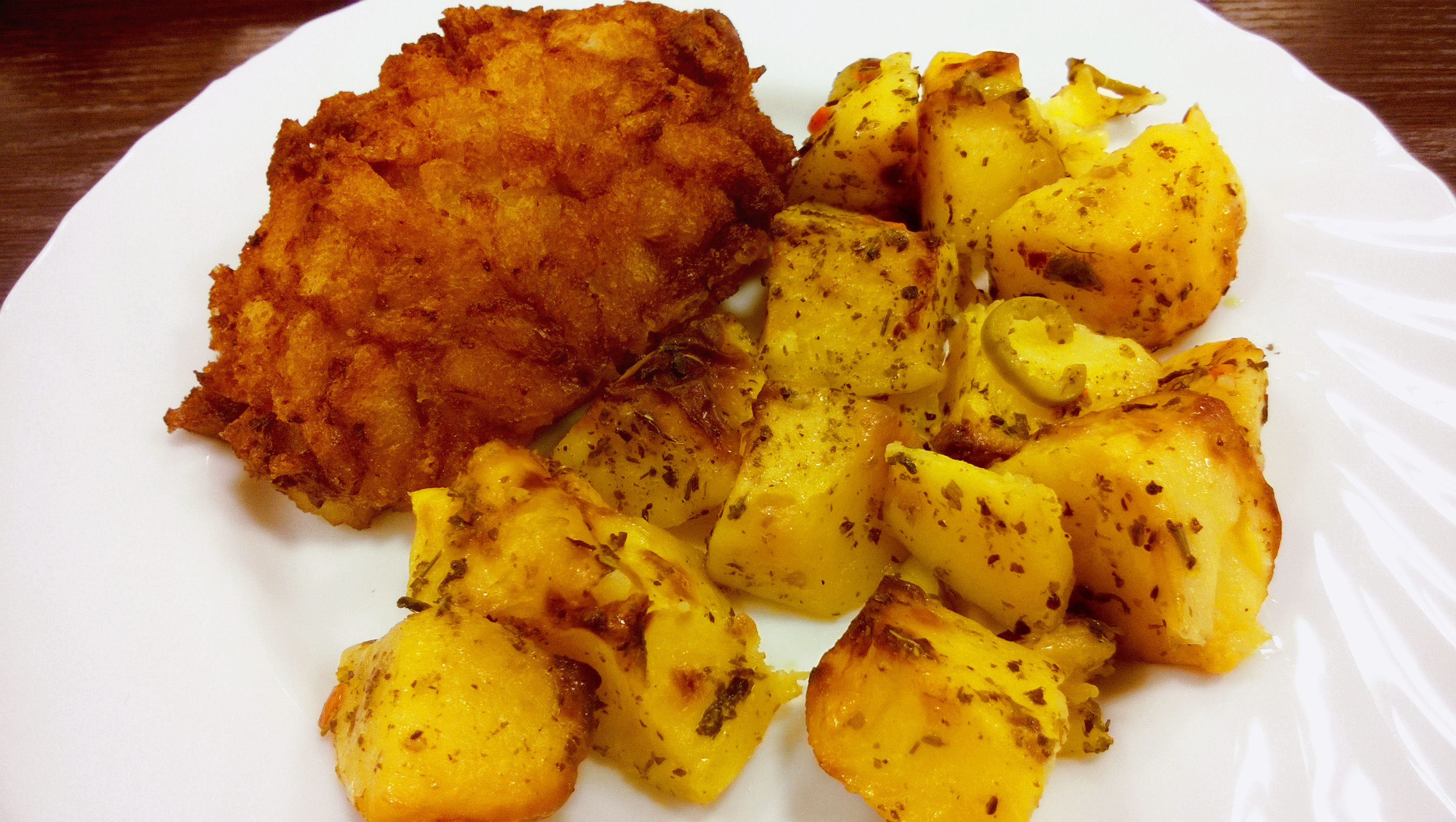
A Pozharsky cutlet served with sautéed potatoes

The main difference between the old time côtelette de volaille and the modern chicken Kiev is that the elaborate stuffings of the former are replaced by butter. The use of butter for chicken cutlets has been known in Russian cuisine at least since the invention of the Pozharsky cutlet in the first half of the 19th century. The Pozharsky cutlets are breaded ground chicken patties for which butter is added to minced meat. This results in an especially juicy and tender consistency. The dish was a widely appraised invention of 19th-century Russian cuisine, which was also adopted by French haute cuisine and subsequently by the international cuisine.

=== Individual attributions ===
The Russian Tea Room Cookbook notes that chicken Kiev was "most likely ... a creation of the great French chef Carême at the Court of Alexander I." Marie-Antoine Carême spent just several months of the year 1818 in St. Petersburg, but made a profound impact on Russian cuisine in this short time. The reforms carried out by his followers introduced in particular various meat cuts into Russian cookery. The recipe of the Russian côtelette de volaille is not present in Carême's major work mentioned above, but his "fowl fillet à la Maréchale" could have served as the starting point for the further development of such dishes.

Some Russian sources attribute the creation of this dish (or of its precursor) to Nicolas Appert, French confectioner and chef, best known as the inventor of airtight food preservation. In contrast, common biographic sources for Appert do not mention this dish, and the origin of these claims is unclear.

=== Novo-Mikhailovsky cutlet ===
Russian food historian William Pokhlyobkin claimed that chicken Kiev was invented in 1912 as Novo-Mikhailovskaya kotleta in а St. Petersburg Merchants' Club located near the Mikhailovsky palace, and was renamed kotleta po-kiyevski in 1947 by a Soviet restaurant. However, these claims collide with primary sources. The cookbook by Alexandrova-Ignatieva (including editions before and after 1912) describes indeed Novo-Mikhailovsky cutlets and mentions that they were invented in the club near the Mikhailovsky palace. However, in the provided recipe these cutlets are made from minced meat similarly to the Pozharsky cutlet, with the only difference being the meat pounded by a tenderizer until it gets minced. This allows one to remove tendons from the meat and results in a more tender consistency of the ground meat than after the use of a grinder. The author also remarks that not only breasts but also other parts of chicken can be prepared this way and added to the mixture of meat and butter.

The second claim of Pokhlyobkin's version is invalidated, as the references of chicken Kiev appeared in published sources much earlier, since the 1910s.

=== Modern chicken Kiev ===
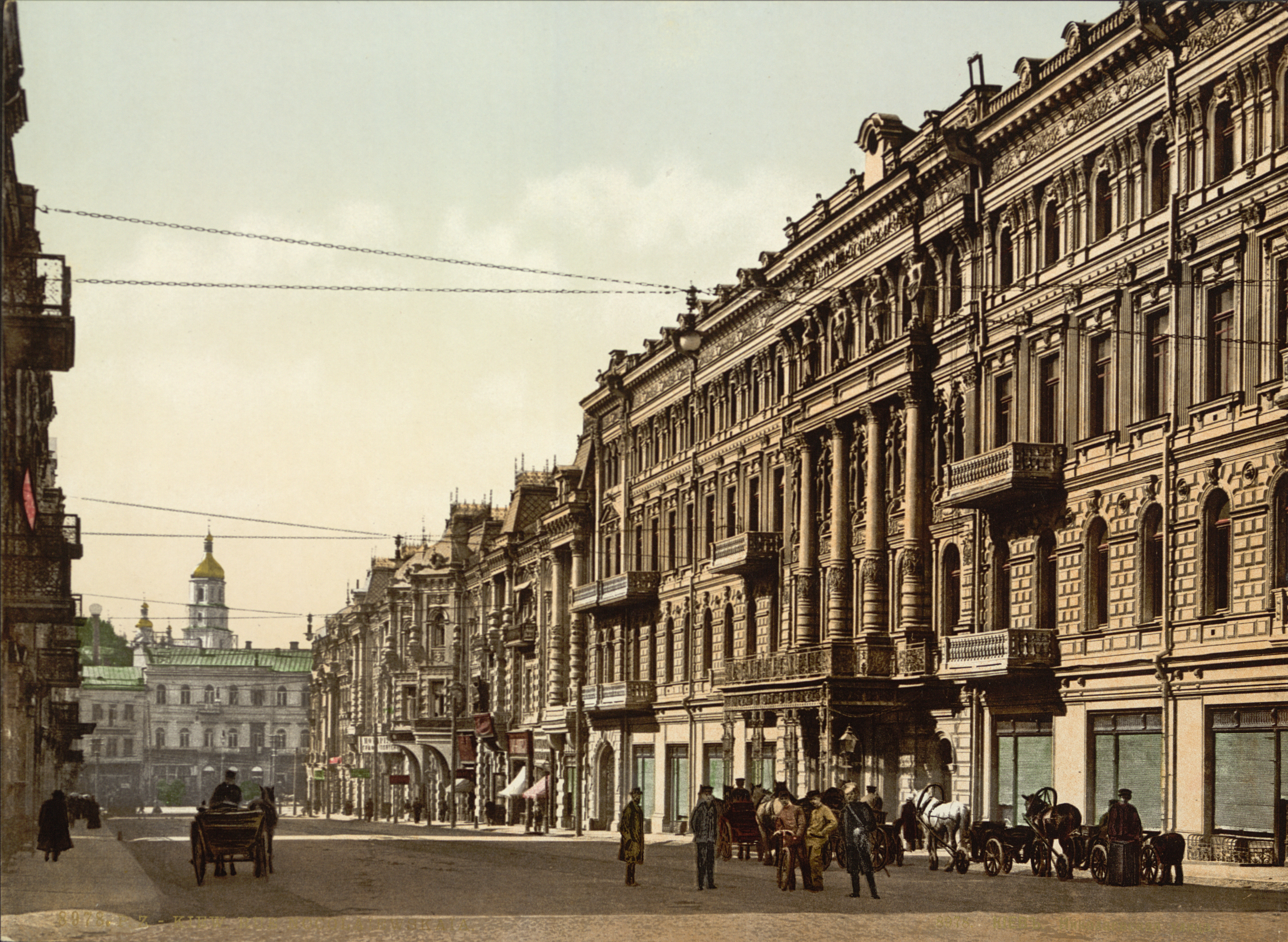
Continental hotel in Kyiv, beginning of the 20th century

Oral tradition in Kiev (Kyiv) attributes the invention of the "cutlet de volaille Kiev-style" (kotłeta de-voljaj po-kyjivśky) to the restaurant of the Continental hotel in Kiev in the beginning of the 20th century. A luxury hotel built in 1897 in the center of Kiev, it was run until the German invasion of the Soviet Union in 1941. The building was then mined by the retreating Red Army and exploded when the German Army occupied Kiev in September 1941. After the war, the building was rebuilt and has since then been used by the Kiev Conservatory. According to the memoirs of contemporaries, Chicken Kiev was the signature dish of the hotel's restaurant.

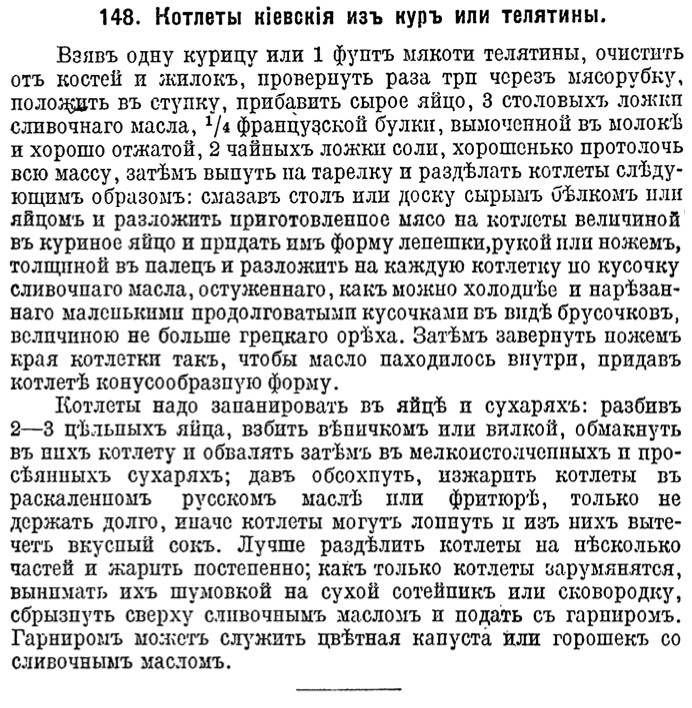
Recipe of "Kiev cutlets from chicken or veal". Cookery Digest, 1915.

An early reference of "Kiev cutlets from chicken or veal" is found in the Cookery Digest (1915), a collection of recipes which were published in the Moscow Journal for Housewives in 1913–1914. These were minced meat cutlets similar to the Pozharsky cutlets, but shaped like a croquette with a bar of cold butter placed in the middle. Like modern chicken Kiev, the croquettes were covered with egg and breadcrumbs and fried.

Later, "chicken cutlets Kiev-style" were listed in Apportionments for dinners, separate dishes and other products of public catering (1928) which served as a standard reference for Soviet catering establishments. The book also included other items for chicken cutlets, such as "cutlet de volaille" and "cutlet à la Maréchale". The book demanded renaming of many traditional restaurant dishes to replace the (mostly French-style) "bourgeois" names with simple "proletarian" forms. In particular, the "cutlet Kiev-style" had to be renamed into "chicken cutlet stuffed with butter". This program was not realised immediately (at least not completely), and its successor, The Directory of Apportionments for Catering (1940), published by the Soviet Ministry of Food Industry, still included the traditional names. In post-World War II publications of this directory and in other Soviet cookery books, such as Cookery (1955), the "Kiev-style" name was retained, but the terms de volaille and à la Maréchale were indeed dropped in favour of simple names such as "chicken cutlet stuffed with milk sauce", "chicken cutlet stuffed with liver" and "chicken cutlet stuffed with chicken quenelle and mushrooms". As a result of this policy, the names de volaille and à la Maréchale disappeared from menus of Soviet restaurants.

The "old-style" name "cutlet de volaille Kiev-style" was occasionally mentioned in some post-World War II Soviet fiction books. In particular, in a short story This Is Not Written In A Cookbook (1947) by Yevgeny Vorobyov, a Soviet soldier and a former chef in a Moscow noble hotel explains to his comrade in arms, that "cutlets de volaille are made for two tastes. There are cutlets de volaille Kiev-style and cutlets de volaille jardiniere."

The name kotlet de volaille is used to this day for chicken Kiev in Poland. The name is oftentimes polonised as dewolaj (dewolaje for plural).

Mentions of chicken Kiev are also found in US newspapers starting from 1937. The reports describe the Russian-style restaurant Yar in Chicago serving this dish. The restaurant existed until 1951 and was run by Vladimir Yaschenko, a former colonel of the imperial Russian army. It was styled after the famous eponymous Moscow restaurant and was frequented by celebrities of that time. After World War II, US newspapers mentioned chicken Kiev served in New York restaurants. Recipes for a "chicken cutlet à la Kiev" were published in The New York Times in 1946 and in Gourmet magazine in 1948.

Since the end of the 1940s or beginning of the 1950s, chicken Kiev became a standard fare in Soviet high class restaurants, in particular in the Intourist hotel chain serving foreign tourists. Tourist booklets warned the diners of the danger it presented to their clothing. At the same time the popularity of this dish grew in the US. According to Darra Goldstein chicken Kiev became "a symbol of Russian haute cuisine".

== Variants ==
Chicken Kiev is made from a boned and skinned breast which is cut lengthwise, pounded and stuffed with butter. Western recipes usually call for garlic butter, while in Russian ones unflavoured butter is used. Herbs (parsley and dill) can be added to the butter. In some American recipes butter is replaced by blue cheese.

In the classical preparation of French côtelettes de volaille, the humerus bone of the wing is left attached. This also holds for their Russian versions and in particular for chicken Kiev. For serving, the bone is usually covered with a frilled paper napkin. Industrially produced pure fillets are often used nowadays, and the cutlets are served without the bone. This is the usual way of serving chicken Kiev in the US. A spherically shaped version was developed by English chef Jesse Dunford Wood.

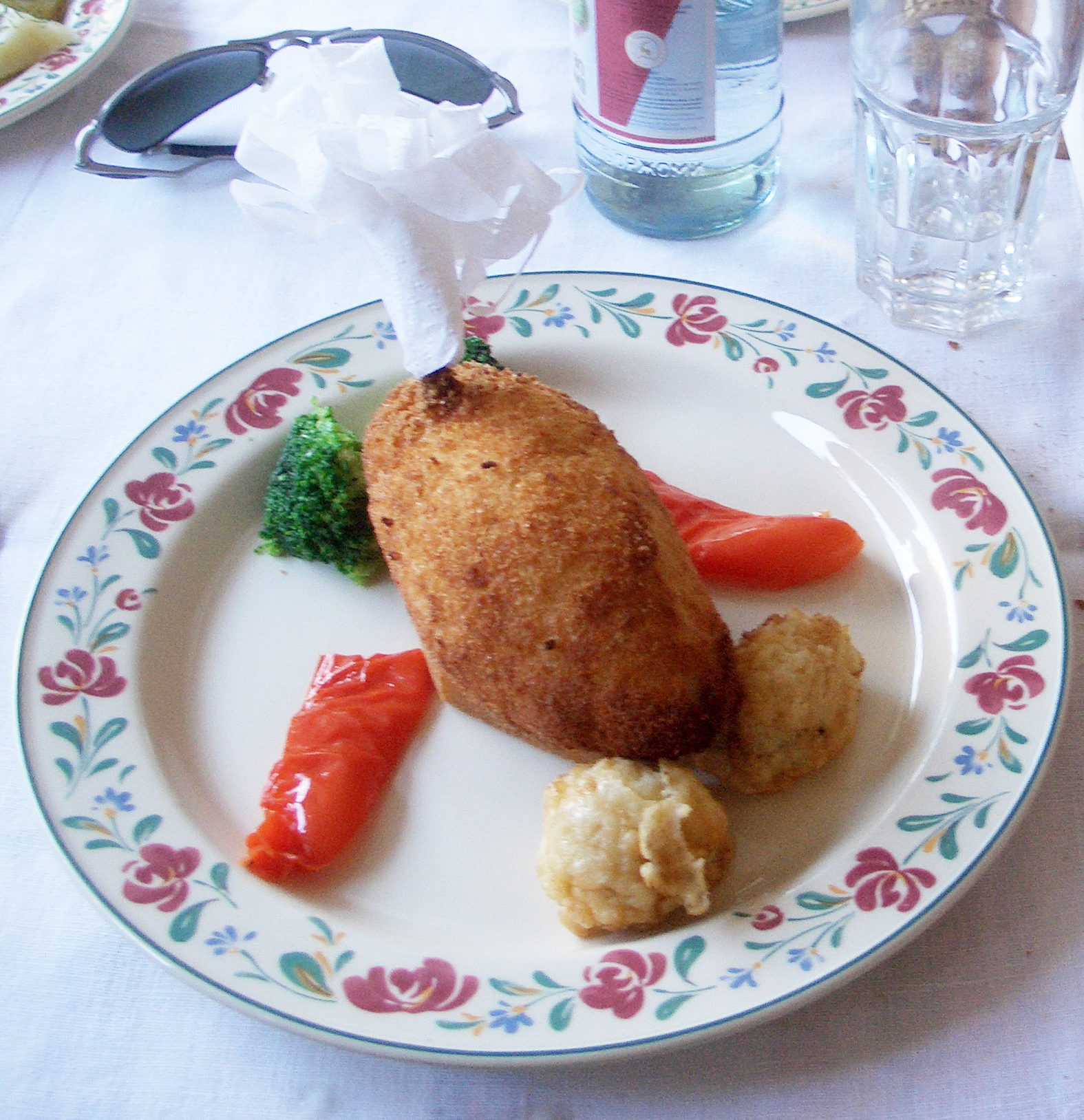
Classical version with bone retained, as served in Kyiv

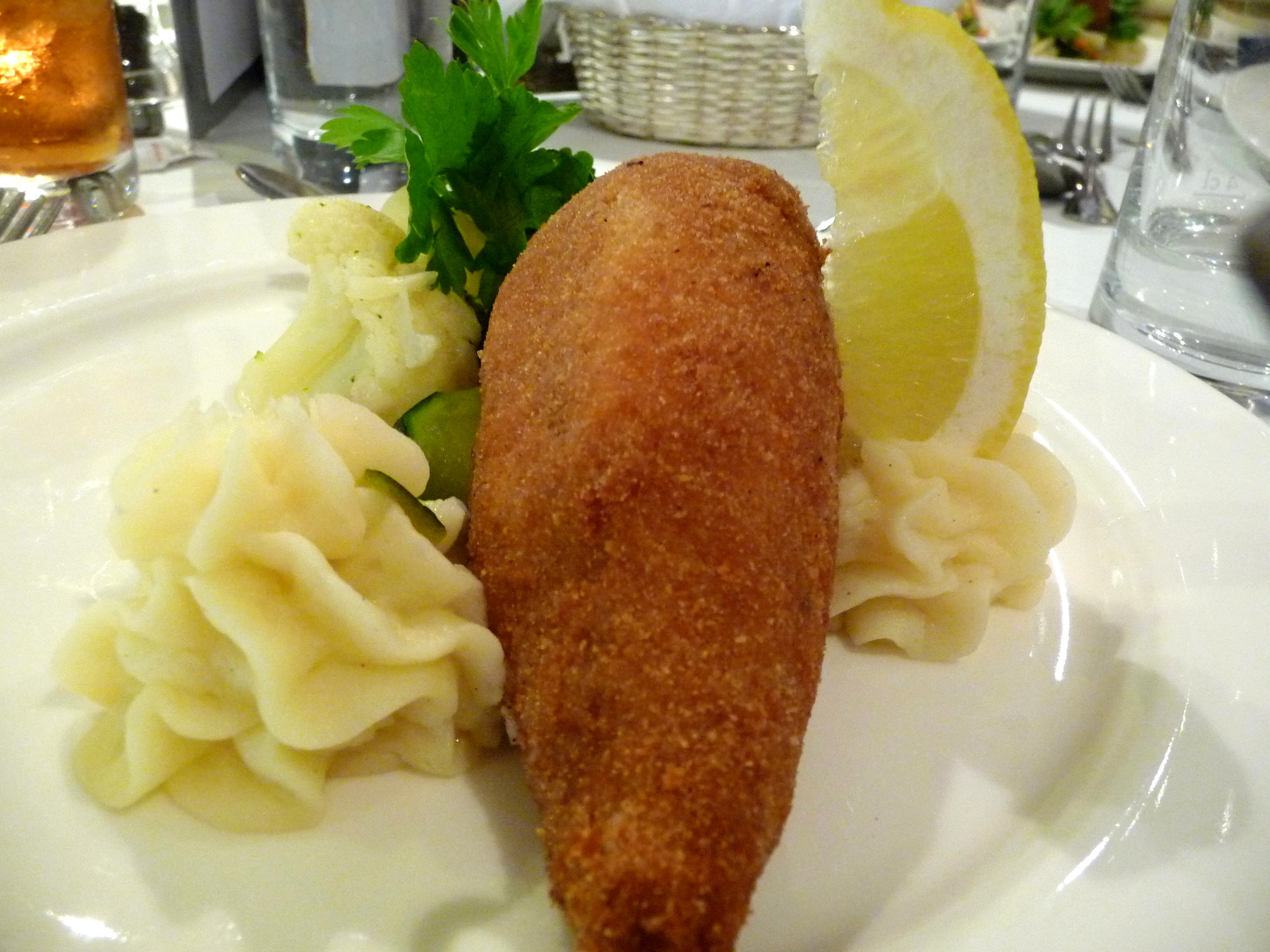
Boneless version

== Convenience food ==
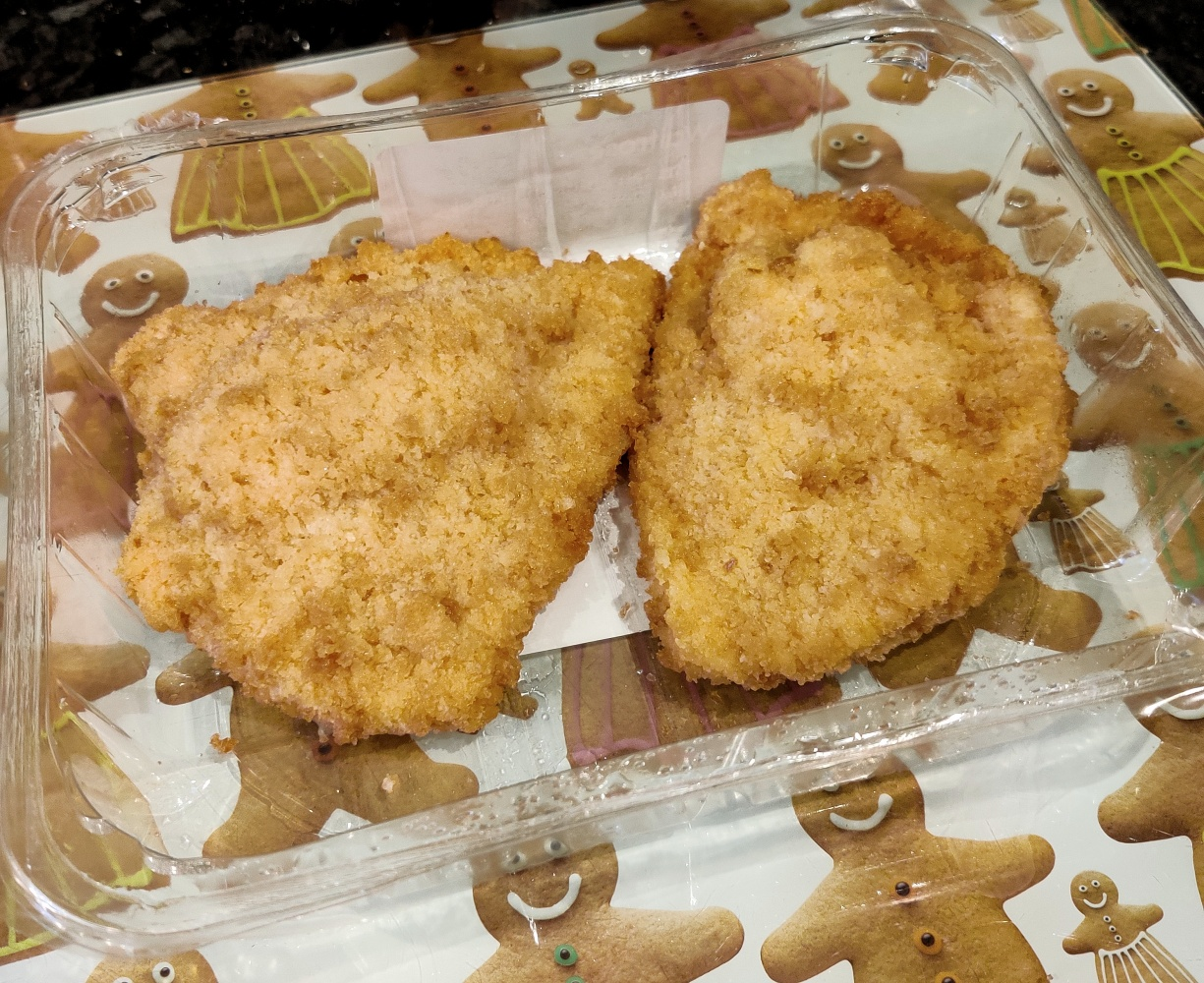
Pre-prepared chicken Kiev

In the middle of the 20th century, semi-processed ground meat cutlets were introduced in the USSR. Colloquially known as Mikoyan cutlets (named after Soviet politician Anastas Mikoyan), these were cheap pork or beef cutlet-shaped patties which resembled industrially produced American beef burgers. Some varieties bore names of well known Russian restaurant dishes but they had little in common with the original dishes. In particular, a variety of a pork patty was called "Kiev-style cutlet". Since the late Soviet times, "real" chicken Kiev cutlets have been offered in Russia as convenience food.

Introduced in Britain during 1979, chicken Kiev was Marks & Spencer company's first ready-made meal. It remains popular in the UK, being readily available in supermarkets and served in some restaurant chains. Due to its popularity, it is included in the UK inflation basket which is composed by the Office for National Statistics for calculations of the consumer price inflation indices. The wide popularity of chicken Kiev as a pre-packaged meal led to the term Kiev being applied to various stuffed chicken dishes, such as "leek-and-bacon Kiev", "cheese-and-ham Kiev" (the same dish as chicken cordon bleu), and "vegetarian Kiev" (made from beans).

== Similar dishes ==
Among other dishes similar to chicken Kiev, the aforementioned chicken cordon bleu with a cheese and ham filling instead of butter is particularly popular in the West. The recipe of Karađorđeva šnicla, a Serbian breaded veal or pork cutlet, was inspired by chicken Kiev.

== Cultural references ==
The "Chicken Kiev speech" is the derisive name coined by William Safire for then-U.S. President George H. W. Bush's speech in Kiev on 1 August 1991, which opposed independence for Ukraine, cautioning Ukrainians against "suicidal nationalism". Bush did what he could diplomatically to keep the Soviet Union together, but on 24 August Ukraine declared independence, and on 1 December Ukrainians voted for it in a national referendum, leading to the USSR's dissolution by 26 December.

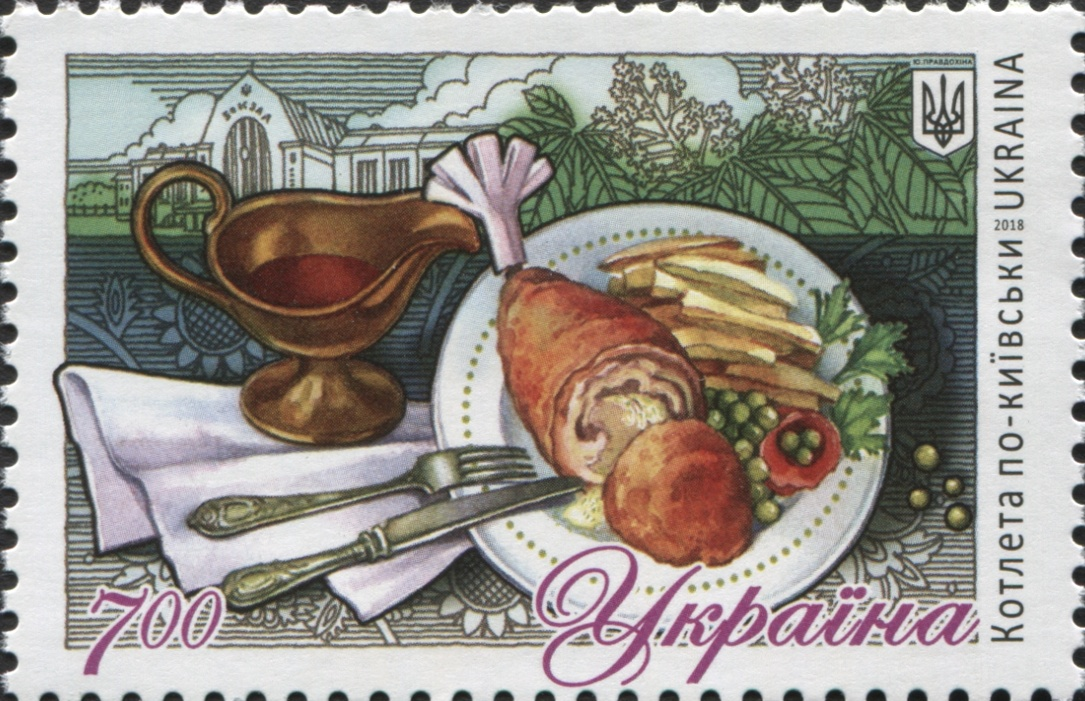
Postage stamp of Ukraine dedicated to chicken Kiev, 2018

In 2018, a bronze miniature sculpture of chicken Kiev was placed on Horodecki street in Kyiv, Ukraine, near the restaurant "Chicken Kyiv". The sculpture became the first of a set of such mini-sculptures depicting famous symbols of Kyiv placed throughout the city as part of an art project.

== See also ==
- Breaded cutlet
- List of chicken dishes
- List of Russian dishes
- Ukrainian cuisine

== Sources ==
- П. В. Абатуров; et al. (1955). М. О. Лифшиц (ed.). Кулинария. Москва: Госторгиздат, Министерство пищевой промышленности СССР. [P. V. Abaturov; et al. (1955). M. O. Lifschitz (ed.). Cookery (in Russian). Moscow: Gostorgizdat, USSR Ministry of Food Industry.]
- Пелагея Павловна Александрова-Игнатьева (1909). Практические основы кулинарного искусства. Санкт-Петербург. [Pelageya Alexandrova-Ignatieva (1909). The Practical Fundamentals of the Cookery Art (in Russian). St. Petersburg.]
- Anders Åslund (March 2009). How Ukraine Became a Market Economy and Democracy. Peterson Institute for International Economics.
- Аркадий Аверченко (1914). Женщина в ресторане. Санкт-Петербург: Новый сатирикон. [Arkady Averchenko (1914). A woman in a restaurant (in Russian). St. Petersburg: Novy Satirikon.]
- John Ayto (2012). The Diner's Dictionary: Word Origins of Food and Drink. Oxford: Oxford University Press. ISBN 978-0-199-64024-9.
- Mirosław Bańko (2003). Wielki słownik wyrazów obcych PWN (in Polish). Państwowe Wydawnictwo Naukowe. ISBN 978-8-301-13941-4.
- Книга о вкусной и здоровой пище (in Russian). Москва: Пищепромиздат (Food Industry publishing house). 1952. [English translation: The Book of Tasty and Healthy Food. Translated by Boris Ushumirskiy. SkyPeak Publishing. 1912. ISBN 978-0615691350. ]
- Mikhail Bulgakov (1928–1940). The Master and Margarita. Moscow: Moskva (first publication 1966–67).
- Marian Burros (14 August 1988). "FARE OF THE COUNTRY; Further Tribulations of the Chicken From Kiev". The New York Times.
- Sarah Butler (4 March 2022). "Sainsbury's renames chicken kievs and pulls Russian-made vodka". The Guardian.
- Александр Былинов (1959). Пароль "ДП-3". Москва: Молодая гвардия. [Alexander Bylinov (1959). Password "DP-3" (in Russian). Moscow: Molodaya Gvardiya.]
- Marie Antonin Carême; Armand Plumerey; Charles Frédéric Alfred Fayot (1847). L'art de la cuisine française au dix-neuviême siêcle : traité élémentaire et pratique (in French). Vol. 4. Entrées chaudes. Work completed after Carême's death by Armand Plumerey.
- "A Line O'Type Or Two". Chicago Daily Tribune. 26 November 1937. p. 10.
- "Chefs Reveal a Fondness for Plain Dishes". Chicago Daily Tribune. 16 March 1939. p. 18.
- "Yar Restaurant Owner Reports He's Bankrupt". Chicago Daily Tribune. 6 January 1951. p. 9.
- "Yaschenko, 71, Dies; Owner of Yar in 1930s". Chicago Tribune. 7 November 1968. p. B23.
- Felicity Cloake (7 June 2012). "How to cook the perfect chicken Kiev". The Guardian.
- Кулинарный сборник. Москва: Журнал для хозяек. 1915. [Cookery Digest (in Russian). Moscow: Journal for housewives. 1915.]
- H. L. Cracknell; R. J. Kaufmann (1999). Practical Professional Cookery. Cengage Learning EMEA. ISBN 978-1-86152-873-5.
- Научно-исследовательский институт торговли и общественного питания (1940). Сборник раскладок для предприятий общественного питания. Москва: Госторгиздат. [Research Institute of Trade and Catering of the Ministry of Trade of the USSR (1940). Directory of Apportionments for Catering (in Russian). Moscow: Gostorgizdat (publishing house of the State Ministry of Trade).]
- Научно-исследовательский институт торговли и общественного питания (1980). Сборник рецептур блюд и кулинарных изделий для предприятий общественного питания. Москва: Госторгиздат. [Research Institute of Trade and Catering of the Ministry of Trade of the USSR (1980). Directory of Recipes and Coolinary Products for Catering (in Russian). Moscow: Gostorgizdat (publishing house of the State Ministry of Trade).]
- "Unusual Dishes From Sirniki to Blinys Discovered by Food Expert on Recent Trip". 1. The Dallas Morning News. 25 February 1938. p. 10.
- Velimir Dejanović (11 June 2004). "Одликовао шницлу "Карађорђеву"". Politika (in Serbian).
- Graeme Demianyk (4 March 2022). "Here's Why 'Chicken Kiev' Is Being Renamed 'Chicken Kyiv'". HuffPost UK.
- Urbain Dubois (1868). La cuisine classique: études pratiques, raisonnées et démonstratives de l'Ecole française appliquée au service à la russe (in French) (3 ed.). E. Dentu.
- Larry Elliott (13 March 2012). "Inflation 'shopping basket' includes tablet computers and Twilight". The Guardian.
- Auguste Escoffier (1907). A Guide to Modern Cookery. London: W. Heinemann.
- Charles Elmé Francatelli (1859). The Modern Cook. reprinted by Applewood Books, 2008. ISBN 9781429012102.
- Продуктовые нормы обедов, отдельных блюд и прочих изделий общественных столовых (раскладки). Москва: паевое товарищество "Нарпит". 1928. [Ration standards (apportionments) for dinners, separate dishes and other products of public catering (in Russian). Moscow: Narpit (state organisation for public catering). 1928.]
- Gelman, Judy; Zheutlin, Peter (6 December 2011). The Unofficial Mad Men Cookbook: Inside the Kitchens, Bars, and Restaurants of Mad Men. BenBella Books. ISBN 978-1-936661-40-4.
- Darra Goldstein (1999). A Taste of Russia: A Cookbook of Russian Hospitality. Russian Information Service. ISBN 978-1-88010-042-4.
- Darra Goldstein (October 1995). "Russia, Carême, and the Culinary Arts". The Slavonic and East European Review. 73 (4). The Modern Humanities Research Association and University College London, School of Slavonic and East European Studies: 691–715. JSTOR 4211935.
- "Chicken Cutlet a la Kiev". Gourmet. Condé Nast. July 1948. p. 59.
- Amanda Hesser (2010). The Essential New York Times Cookbook: Classic Recipes for a New Century. W. W. Norton & Company. ISBN 978-0-39324-767-1.
- В. Д. Коростышевский; К. И. Левитский; Н. П. Цыпленков; Г. Ф. Шорин (1955). Организация предприятий общественного питания. Москва: Госторгиздат, Министерство пищевой промышленности СССР. [V. D. Korostyshevskiy; K. I. Levitskiy; N. P. Tsyplyonkov; G. F. Shorin (1958). The organisation of foodservice (in Russian). Moscow: Gostorgizdat, USSR Ministry of Food Industry.]
- Mario Jack Leto; Willi Karl Heinrich Bode (2006). The Larder Chef. Routledge. ISBN 978-0-75066-899-6.
- Jeremy MacVeigh (2008). International Cuisine. Cengage Learning. ISBN 978-1-41804-965-2.
- Феля Май (5 December 1997). "Непростительная оплошность". ZN, UA (Зеркало недели. Украина). Archived from the original on 21 September 2016. [Felya May (5 December 1997). "Unforgivable Mistake" (in Russian). ZN, UA.]
- "1970 to 1990". Marks in Time. Marks & Spencer.
- Н. Н. Маслов (1911). Кулинар. Санкт-Петербург: В. И. Губинский. [N. N. Maslov (1911). The Cook (in Russian). St. Petersburg: V. I. Gubinsky.]
- Adolphe Meyer (1903). The post-graduate cookery book. New York: Caterer Pub. Co. Archived from the original on 16 October 2023.
- Martin Miller-Yianni (2011). 100 Essential Recipes from Bulgaria. Lulu.com. ISBN 978-1-44675-384-2.
- Елена Молоховец (1861). Подарок молодым хозяйкам (in Russian). Санкт-Петербург. A Gift to Young Housewives, English translation: Joyce Stetson Toomre (1998). Classic Russian Cooking: Elena Molokhovets' a Gift to Young Housewives. Indiana University Press. ISBN 978-0-253-21210-8.
- Joe Moran (24 January 2005). "Hum, ping, rip: the sounds of cooking". New Statesman.
- Jane Nickerson (6 August 1946). "News of the Food. Chefs Challenges Housewives, Says Few Know How to Do Chicken Kiev". The New York Times.
- Вильям Похлёбкин (2006). Кулинарный словарь. Москва: Центрполиграф. ISBN 5-227-00460-9. [William Pokhlyobkin (2006). Dictionary of Cookery (in Russian). Moscow: Centrpoligraf.]
- Вильям Похлёбкин (2004). Национальные кухни наших народов (PDF). Москва: Центполиграф. ISBN 5-9524-0718-8. Archived from the original (PDF) on 19 June 2018. [William Pokhlyobkin (2004). National cuisines of our peoples (in Russian). Moscow: Centrpoligraf.]
- Вильям Похлёбкин (4 May 1997). "Стреляющие котлеты". Огонёк. Москва. Archived from the original on 28 September 2011. [William Pokhlyobkin (1997). "Popping cutlets". Ogonyok (in Russian). Moscow.]
- "Проект "Шукай". Главные символы Киева". в Киеве - Достопримечательности Киева - памятники, скульптуры. В Киеве. 2018. ["Project Shukay ('Search'). Major symbols of Kiev". в Киеве - Достопримечательности Киева - памятники, скульптуры (in Russian). V Kieve. 2018.]
- June Provines (6 October 1939). "Front Views and Profiles". Chicago Daily Tribune. p. 28.
- Kate Salter (10 October 2010). "Cathy Chapman: the woman who changed the way we eat". The Telegraph.
- Andrew F. Smith, ed. (2004). Oxford Encyclopedia of Food and Drink in America. Vol. 2. New York: Oxford University Press.
- Фёдор Сологуб (1997) [стихотворение 1926 г.]. "И породисты, и горды...". Неизданный Федор Сологуб. [Fyodor Sologub (1997) [a poem written in 1926]. "High-bred and proud...". Unpublished Fyodor Sologub (in Russian).]
- Fyodor Stepun (1947). Vergangenes und Unvergängliches (in German). Vol. 1. Munich: Kösel-Verlag.
- Faith Steward-Gordon and Nika Hazelton (1981). Russian Tea Room Cookbook. Richard Marek Publishers. ISBN 978-0399901287.
- Robert Strybel; Maria Strybel (2005). Polish Heritage Cookery. Hippocrene Books. ISBN 978-0781811248.
- Malcolm Summers (2015). A Biography of Nicolas Appert 1749 - 1841. Downs Way Publishing. ISBN 978-0992751524.
- "Maréchale (à la)". La glosssaire des termes de cuisine (in French). Supertoinette.com.
- Павел Сюткин; Ольга Сюткина (2015). Непридуманная история русской кухни. Астрель. ISBN 978-5-45717-598-3. [Pavel Syutkin; Olga Syutkina (2015). Uninvented History of Russian Cuisine (in Russian). Astrel.]
- Henry Tanner (15 November 1964). "Others come and go—Mikoyan remains". The New York Times.
- Charles Vintcent (2004). Vintcent's French Food Dictionary. Harriman House Limited. ISBN 978-1-897597-48-4.
- Anne Volokh (1983). The Art of Russian Cuisine. New York: MacMillan.
- Евгений Воробьёв (1947). "Этого нет в поваренной книге". Однополчане: рассказы. Военное издательство Министерства вооружёных сил СССР. [Yevgeny Vorobyov (1947). "This is not written in a cookbook". Companions in arms (in Russian). Moscow: Voenizdat, publishing house of the USSR Ministry of Armed Forces.]
- Marcus Warren (19 June 2001). "E-mail from Ukraine". Electronic Telegraph.
- "News of Capital Night Clubs". The Washington Post. 26 October 1938. p. X16.
- "Bush Sr. clarifies 'Chicken Kiev' speech". The Washington Times. 24 May 2004.
- Alexander Watt (2014). Paris Bistro Cookery. Routledge. ISBN 978-1-317-84617-8.
- David T. Zabecki, ed. (2015) [1999]. World War II in Europe: An Encyclopedia. Routledge. ISBN 978-1-135-81242-3.
