= Pozharsky cutlet =

Russian dish of breaded ground meat

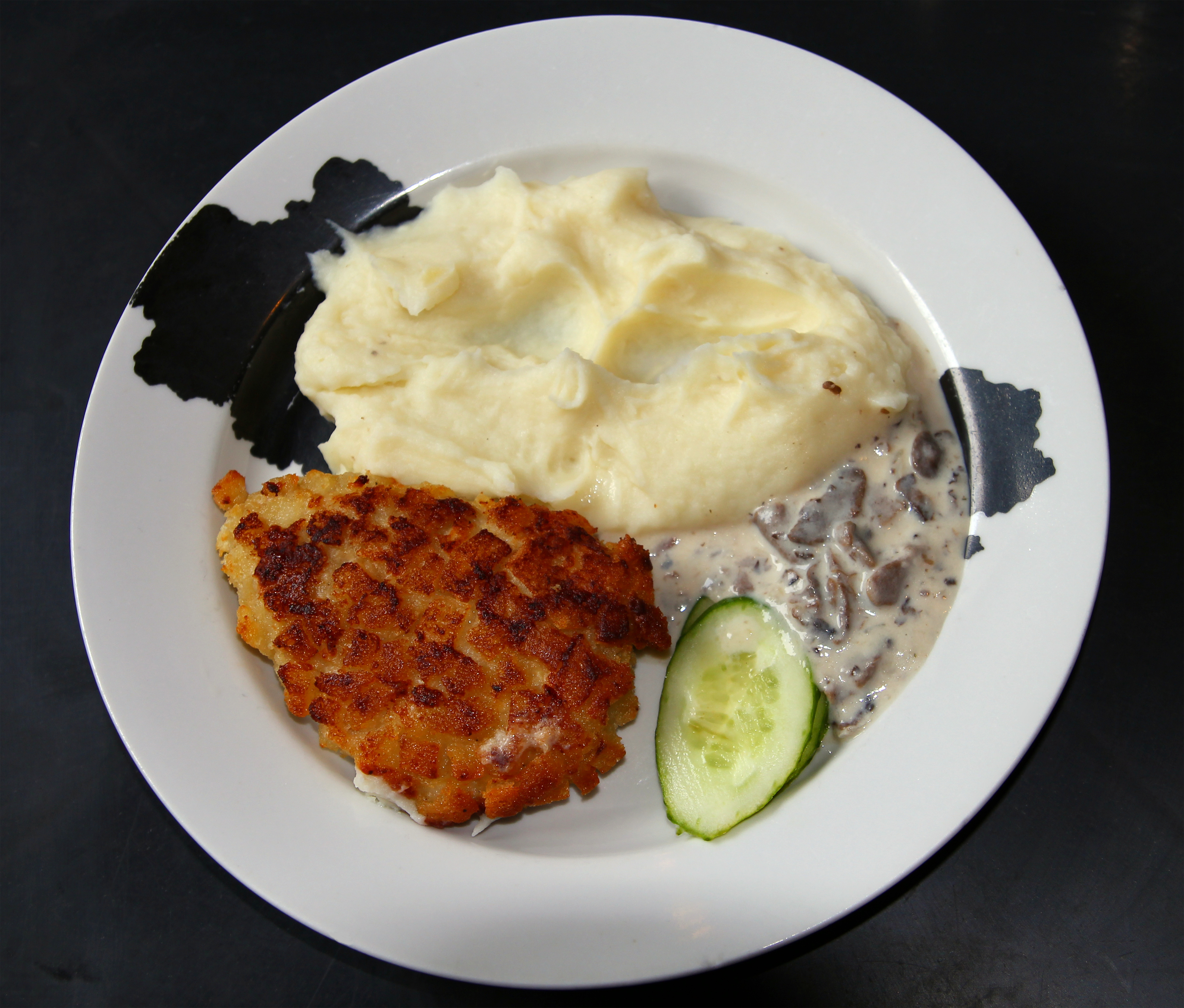
- A Pozharsky cutlet served with mashed potatoes, mushroom sauce and sliced cucumber
- Alternative names: Chicken suprême Pojarski, veal chop Pojarski
- Type: Patty, minced cutlet
- Course: Main
- Place of origin: Russia
- Serving temperature: Hot
- Main ingredients: Chicken or veal, bread crumbs, butter

A Pozharsky cutlet (Russian: пожарская котлета, pozharskaya kotleta, plural: пожарские котлеты, pozharskie kotlety; also spelled Pojarski) is a breaded ground chicken or veal patty that is typical of Russian cuisine. A distinct feature of this cutlet is adding butter to minced meat, which results in an especially juicy and tender consistency. The dish was created in the beginning of the 19th century in Russia and later adopted by French haute cuisine.

== Terminology ==
The general Russian term kotleta (cutlet) may denote both a thin slice of meat and a cutlet-shaped patty made of ground meat. The latter meaning is much more common today. Both meanings are also used in haute cuisine. Escoffier notes that minced chicken cutlets differ from chicken croquettes only in shape.

== History ==
A popular historical myth related the creation of this dish to prince Dmitry Pozharsky. In reality, the dish name is associated with another Pozharsky family, the owners of an inn and a restaurant in Torzhok. Located between Moscow and Saint Petersburg, the small town of Torzhok was a common place for coach stops where the travellers took a break and changed horses. Alexander Pushkin recommended in 1826 in a letter to a friend to "dine at Pozharsky in Torzhok, try fried cutlets and set out with a light mood".

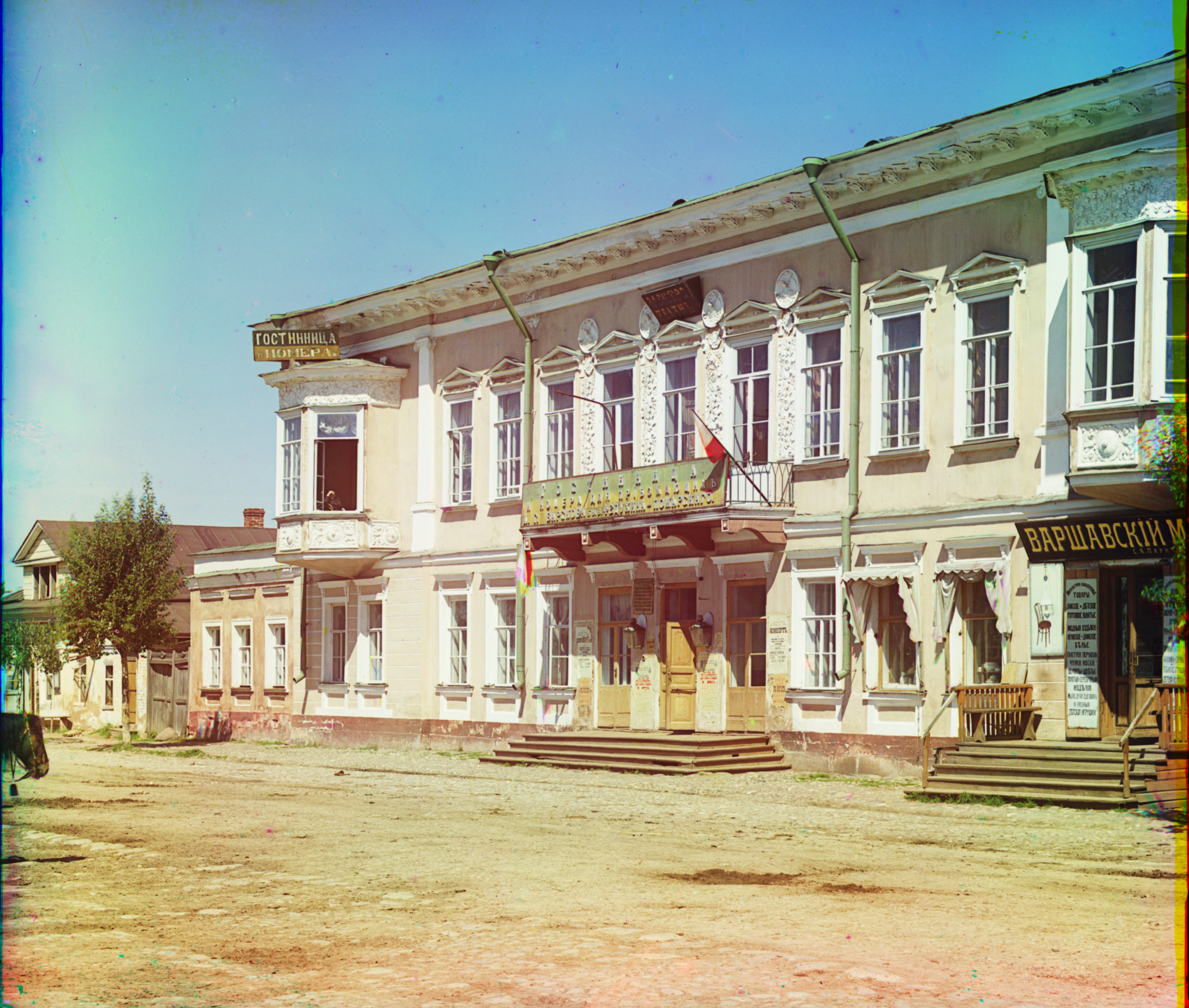
Pozharsky inn, Torzhok, 1910. Photo by Sergey Prokudin-Gorsky

At that time the inn was owned by Yevdokim Pozharsky, a coachman. The preparation method is usually attributed to Darya Pozharskaya, the daughter of Yevdokim. Several legends appeared about the origin of this dish. According to one legend, the recipe was given to the Pozharskys by a poor French traveller as payment for the accommodation.

Initially the patties were made of ground beef or veal. The chicken version appeared probably in 1830–1840s when Darya Pozharskaya inherited the inn after her father's death. There are numerous references by the contemporaries mentioning both veal cutlets Pozharsky and their versions made of minced chicken and coated with breadcrumbs. The cutlets are mentioned in particular by Leitch Ritchie (1836), Victor d’Arlincourt (1843) and Théophile Gautier (1875). The first complete recipes of Pozharsky cutlets were published in a Russian cookbook in 1853; the cookbook included a recipe for chicken cutlets and one for fish cutlets. Pelageya Alexandrova-Ignatieva notes in The Practical Fundamentals of the Cookery Art (1899–1916) that the same cutlets can also be made from game (grouse, partridge etc.).

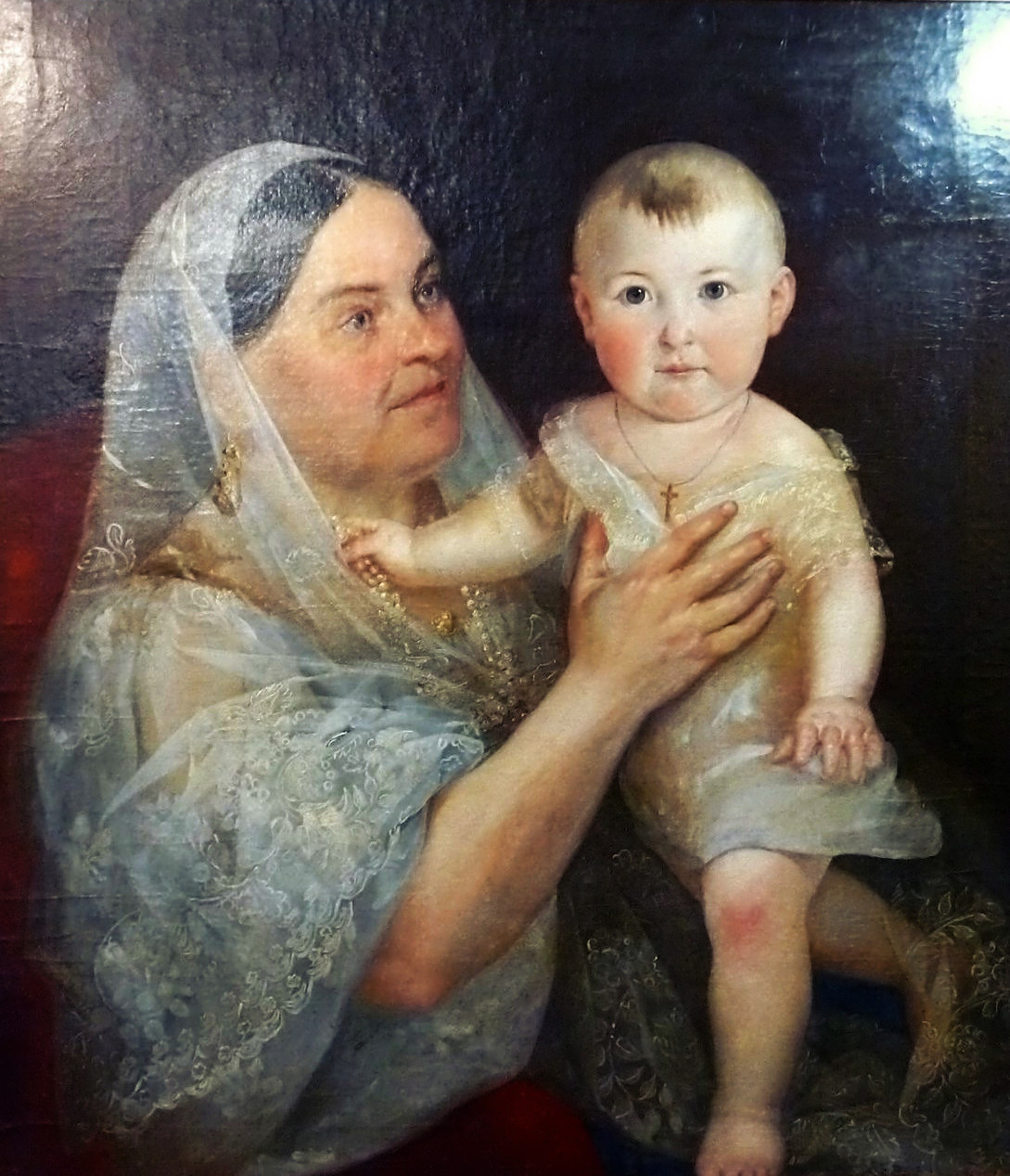
Darya Pozharskaya with a child. Painting by Carl Timoleon von Neff

Tsar Nicolas I was greatly impressed by the taste of Pozharsky cutlets, and Darya Pozharskaya was invited several times to the imperial court to cook this dish for the Tsar's family.

In the 19th and 20th century, the dish was adopted by French chefs, and various cutlet-shaped patties made of minced meat (veal, chicken, grouse, hare) or fish (salmon) mixed with butter were named Pojarski in classical French cookbooks.

The chicken cutlet Pozharsky was later included in the Soviet Book of Tasty and Healthy Food and remained a common restaurant dish during the Soviet period.

== Variants ==
Various authors describe somewhat different procedures of preparing these cutlets. Alexandrova-Ignatieva recommends the use of butter in its solid form for mixing with ground chicken meat. In the recipe included in The Book of Tasty and Healthy Food, white bread soaked in milk and heated butter are added to ground chicken meat. In general, many authors suggest mixing white bread soaked in milk with the ground meat. In some recipes heavy cream is added. Some chefs replace butter completely with heavy cream.

For presentation, the meat can be formed on a veal chop bone (for veal cutlets) or a chicken wing bone (for chicken cutlets).

== Semi-processed cutlets ==
In the middle of the 20th century, industrially produced, semi-processed ground meat cutlets were introduced in the USSR. Colloquially known as Mikoyan cutlets (named after Soviet politician Anastas Mikoyan), these were cheap pork or beef cutlet-shaped patties which resembled American burgers. Some varieties bore names of well-known Russian restaurant dishes but they had little in common with the original dishes. In particular, a variety of a pork patty was called "Pozharsky cutlet".

== See also ==
- Breaded cutlet
- Chicken Kiev
- List of Russian dishes
