= Double Down (sandwich) =

KFC sandwich

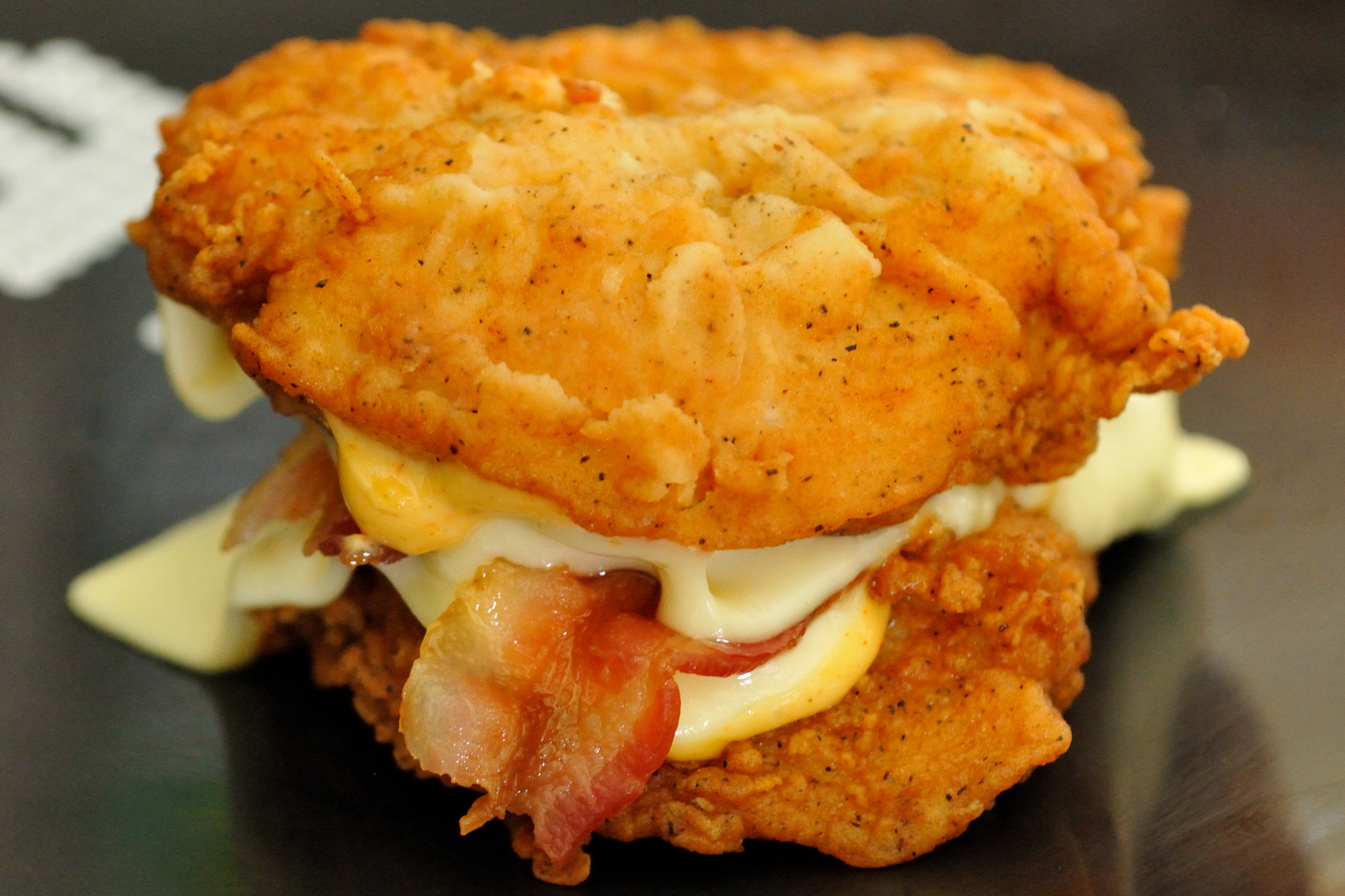

Nutritional value per 248 g
- Energy: 2,552.24 kJ (610.00 kcal)
- Carbohydrates: 18g
- Sugars: 1 g
- Dietary fiber: 1 g
- Fat: 37 g
- Saturated: 11 g
- Trans: 1 g
- Protein: 52 g
Vitamins and minerals
Minerals	Quantity %DV^{†}
Sodium	82% 1880 mg
- Other constituents: Quantity
- Cholesterol: 150 mg
- ^{†}Percentages estimated using US recommendations for adults.

The Double Down is a sandwich offered by Kentucky Fried Chicken (KFC) restaurants. It has two pieces of fried chicken fillet, as opposed to bread, containing bacon, cheese, and a sauce. Variants have included fillets that are grilled or with a spicy coating.

== History ==
=== Africa ===
KFC South Africa premiered the Double Down in March 2013. To obtain its halal certification, the bacon is replaced with a slice of processed smoked chicken.

=== Asia ===
In November 2010, the Double Down was launched in select branches in the Philippines, the first in Asia. Nearly one year later, in October 2011, KFC Philippines replaced it with the Zinger Double Down, with a spicy flavor and crunchy skin. The product was discontinued in the Philippines in mid-2012, but reintroduced in January 2014 together with a smaller version, the Junior Double Down. It was discontinued yet again in May 2014, but relaunched in January 2015 for a limited time only, together with a new variation, the Double Down Dog. In January 2016, another new variation was introduced, the Double Down G which contained "crispy fried spinach" with a "secret green sauce". In March 2019, the Original Double Down and the Junior Double Down returned to the menu with the Zinger Double Down also being reintroduced the following month. These were available until April 30, 2019. On August 27, 2021, both the Original and Zinger Double Downs were brought back again to the menu, but were discontinued at the end of October. On April 25, 2023, the Original and Zinger Double Downs were again brought back to the menu, together with the Triple Down (three pieces of Original Recipe chicken fillets) and the Junior Double Down Rice Bowl on their "Secret Menu". These were available until June 26, 2023.

On February 2, 2012, the Double Down went on sale in Japan for a limited time as the Chicken Fillet Double. On 27 May 2026, it went on sale again in Japan also for a limited time, this time as "LAS VEGAS style Double Down Fillet Burger".

KFC Singapore launched the Zinger Double Down on April 16, 2012. Instead of regular bacon, the Singapore version uses turkey bacon to conform to halal standards. The most recent release there of the Double Down was the Hawaiian version, with a pineapple slice and BBQ sauce included.

KFC Malaysia introduced the Double Down on September 25, 2012.

In Korea, the Zinger Double Down was sold from December 1, 2012, through March 1, 2013, and re-released in October 2013 along with a variant named Zinger Double Down MAXX with an added hash brown patty and salsa. Both the Zinger Double Down and the Double Down MAXX were later added as a year-round menu in March 2014, and in April the original Double Down was also made available. In October 2014, the Zinger Double Down KING was announced, with a beef patty and barbecue sauce in the middle of two Zinger patties.

In India in October 2017, it was a secret item for the first week, available for purchase to a certain number of invitees and their friends as part of a promotion. In another week, its name was unveiled and made available for purchase by everyone for a limited time.

In July 2018, the Double Down was launched in select branches in Bangkok, Thailand. It was later reintroduced in May 2019.

KFC Indonesia introduced the Double Down starting on 1 February 2020. Also to meet halal standards as in Singapore and Malaysia, the bacon was replaced with hash browns.

=== Europe ===
The Double Down was introduced when KFC was first introduced to Sweden.

It was introduced in Denmark in January 2017.

It was introduced in Germany and was available until March 2017. The German version contains two chicken strips, bacon, Monterey Jack and the special Double Down Sauce by KFC. It returned to the Menu of German Locations as a limited time offer from January to March 2021, November to December 2024, and since January 2026.

KFC released the Double Down in French markets in October 2014 as a limited edition product. It was then re-released in two flavours - Original Bacon and Spicy Zinger - in August 2015 and again in the 3rd flavor "Black Pepper" in September 2017.

In March 2016, the Double Down was introduced in Spain. The Spanish version has bacon, cheddar cheese and barbecue sauce in the two pieces of chicken fillet. Its advertising slogan is "No apto para cobardes" ("Not for cowards").

The Double Down was released in the UK and Ireland on 9 October 2017,following a launch a few days before, remaining available for six weeks until November 19. It was their fastest selling sandwich in recorded history, with one being sold every second.

The Double Down was re-released in the UK and Ireland on 2 July 2018, which remained available until 22 July 2018. It was later announced that the Zinger version would follow from 23 July until 12 August.

The Double Down was re-released in the UK on 10 February 2025, which remained available until 16 March.

=== North America ===
==== Canada ====
On October 18, 2010, KFC restaurants in Canada began selling the fried version of the Double Down for a limited time. It was reported that on its launch date, a KFC in Victoria, British Columbia was sold out of the Double Down by as early as 2 p.m. In French Canada, it is known as "Coup Double", roughly translated as "Double Punch". The Double Down was discontinued in Canada on November 14, 2010, but on May 25, 2011, KFC announced it was returning at least temporarily. In 2012 the Double Down returned to Canada, again for a limited time. In August 2015, KFC Canada finally brought the Double Down back again after a three-year absence. The sandwich returned to Canada in March 2018, again after a three-year absence, as the Waffle Double Down. This version of the Double Down featured a Belgian waffle between two seasoned chicken fillets and used maple-flavored aioli.

==== United States ====
The KFC Double Down was initially test marketed in Omaha, Nebraska, and Providence, Rhode Island. KFC announced it in an April Fools' Day press release, and launched the item in the United States on April 12, 2010. It has been promoted via billboards and a TV commercial that says it has "so much 100 percent premium chicken, we didn't have room for a bun."

Originally, during a limited time offer that was supposed to end on May 23, 2010, KFC announced on May 19, 2010, that the item would remain available indefinitely. The chain cited its popularity in overall sales, as well as videos of people eating the Double Down becoming a YouTube sensation. Stephen Colbert ate one on The Colbert Report, spurring the item's popularity even more. By the end of 2014, the Double Down was no longer on the KFC menu and has remained off to this date.

On March 1, 2023, it was announced through Twitter (presently X) that the Double Down would return for a limited time from March 6.

=== Oceania ===
KFC Australia started selling the Double Down (renamed The Double) with the tagline "make time for mantime" on March 30, 2011, for a limited time only. The Double was successful in Australia, although it was criticized for being unhealthy. KFC Australia announced via their Facebook page that if they reached 500,000 likes, they would bring the Double back to Australian stores for a limited time period of two days. The page reached 500,000 likes on June 15, 2012, and KFC announced that the Double would go on sale on June 27 and 28. The Double reappeared on menus in December 2012, again for a limited time only.

From May 10, 2011, the Double Down was available in New Zealand for an initially limited period of five weeks. The Double Down was also brought back for one day only on March 31, 2012, exclusively in Dunedin to raise funds for the Otago Rugby Union which faced financial difficulties in early 2012. On July 24, 2012, KFC resumed sales of the Double Down in New Zealand.

On October 28, 2016, KFC Australia announced via Facebook that they would again sell the Double Down for a limited time of four weeks, as well as a new spinoff product called the Hawaiian Double (replacing bacon with pineapple), commencing November 1. This was in response to an online campaign launched by Australian Facebook page 'Yeah the Boys'.

In August 2020, KFC Australia quietly launched and sold another variant of the Double Down, named the Zinger Mozzarella Double, which included Zinger-coated mozzarella-filled patties, bacon, mayonnaise and mozzarella cheese. The product was released through a "secret menu" on KFC's mobile delivery app and instructions on how to purchase it were later publicly unveiled through a grassroots advertising campaign on TikTok. Over a year later, in September 2021, KFC Australia launched yet another variant of the Double Down via their mobile app, known as the Pizza Double, which includes pepperoni slices and pizza sauce. The Pizza Double was sold in both original and Zinger variants alongside the regular original and Zinger Doubles. It was sold through September 7 until October 4, 2021.

== Nutritional analysis ==
NPR compared its calorie count to that of McDonald's Premium Crispy Chicken Club Sandwich. Both the grilled and fried Double Down products have nearly a full day's worth of sodium according to the American Heart Association's guidelines. A Los Angeles Times reviewer pointed out that the grilled chicken Double Down has fewer calories and less fat than the fried chicken Double Down (460 versus 540 kilocalories, and 23 g versus 32 g fat) but that the grilled chicken option has more sodium (1,430 mg versus 1,380). The L.A. Times article also noted that both Double Downs have fewer calories than Burger King's TenderCrisp chicken sandwich, which has 800 kilocalories.

== Sales ==
From its April 12, 2010, US launch through early July, a KFC spokesperson reported that the chain had sold 10 million units for a total of about $50 million in revenue. An analyst said that figure accounts for 5% of KFC's sales in that time period, a figure insubstantial to KFC's financial bottom line.

In Canada, the Double Down became KFC's best-selling new menu item ever, selling over 350,000 units in less than 10 days. Despite sales in excess of one million units, KFC Canada discontinued the Double Down in 2010, reviving it again for a short period in 2011. In August 2015, KFC Canada brought back the Double Down for a small period of time. Sales in New Zealand were 600,000 units over its five-week promotional period. Grant Ellis, CFO of New Zealand KFC operator Restaurant Brands, said that despite these sales the Double Down "did cannibalise some of our better-margin products".

Following the launch of Zinger Double Down in Korea, the overall sales for KFC Korea increased by 20%.
