= The Book of Tasty and Healthy Food =

Soviet cookbook

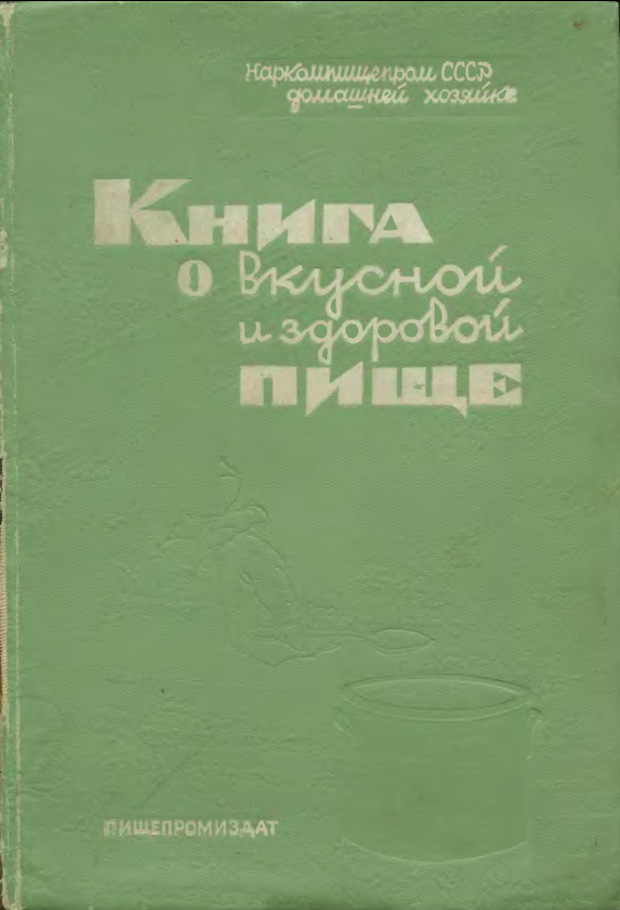
- Front page of the book, first edition, 1939
- Author: Collective work (Institute of Nutrition of the Academy of Medical Scientists of the USSR)
- Original title: Книга о вкусной и здоровой пище
- Language: Russian
- Subject: Culinary Arts
- Genre: non-fiction
- Publisher: Food Industry Publishing House
- Publication date: 1939
- Publication place: Soviet Union
- Media type: Print (hardback)
- Pages: 368 (last published edition)

The Book of Tasty and Healthy Food (Russian: Книга о вкусной и здоровой пище, romanized: Kniga o vkusnoi i zdorovoi pishche) is a Russian cookbook written by scientists from the Institute of Nutrition of the Academy of Medical Sciences of the USSR. The cookbook was first published in 1939, and a further edition was published in 1952. An English translation (by Boris Ushumirskiy) appeared in 2012.

== Origins ==
Following the Russian Revolution, the official ideology promoted communal food preparation and dining, to maximise use of labour and resources and to liberate women to work.

Anastas Mikoyan, who was People's Commissar of the Food Industry of the USSR in the 1930s, became convinced that the USSR needed to modernise the way it produced and consumed food. He travelled widely, bringing many innovations back to the USSR, including the manufacture of canned goods and the mass production of ice cream. In the late 1930s, he spearheaded a project to produce a home cookbook which would encourage a return to the domestic kitchen.

Prior to its introduction, the staple cookbook of Russian cuisine had been Elena Molokhovets' A Gift to Young Housewives, which had been published in numerous editions in late 19th- and early 20th-century Russia and remained in many households after the Revolution. However, as it had been aimed at middle- and upper-class households, it was frowned upon as being bourgeois. Moreover, many of its recipes relied on ingredients that were unavailable and techniques that were impractical in Soviet Russia.

Tasty and Healthy Food was subtitled "To the Soviet Housewife from the People’s Commissariat of the Food Industry" and represented its recipes as a reference work for the new Soviet cuisine. According to the New York Times, the cookbook was "hallowed"; Soviet citizens referred to it as "The Book".

== Content ==
Recipes range from the sumptuous (sturgeon in jelly, cold piglet with horseradish) to the everyday (cabbage stuffed with meat, bean soup). They were accompanied with lavish full-page illustrations of prepared dishes and food production.

== In popular culture ==
British chef Mary Berry modified one of the book's recipes, a variant of deviled eggs which included herring, on her 2017 BBC 2 cookery program Easter Feasts.
