= Antoine Beauvilliers =

French restaurateur

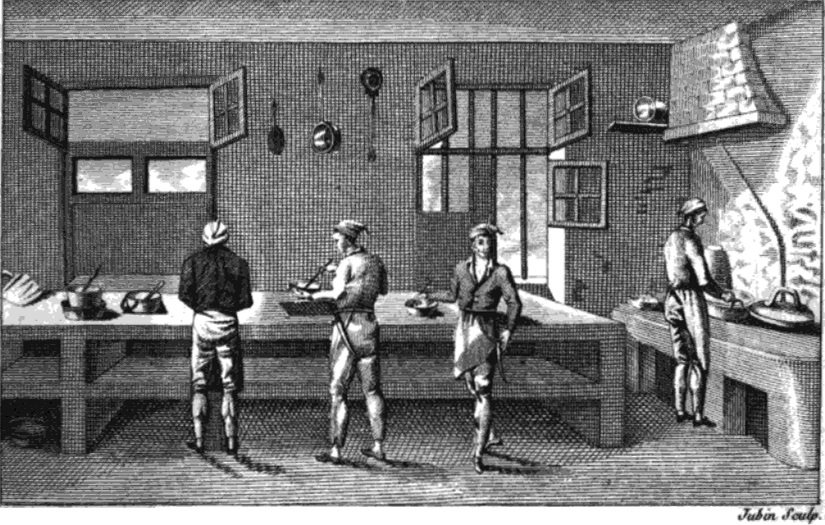
From L'art du Cuisinier, 1814

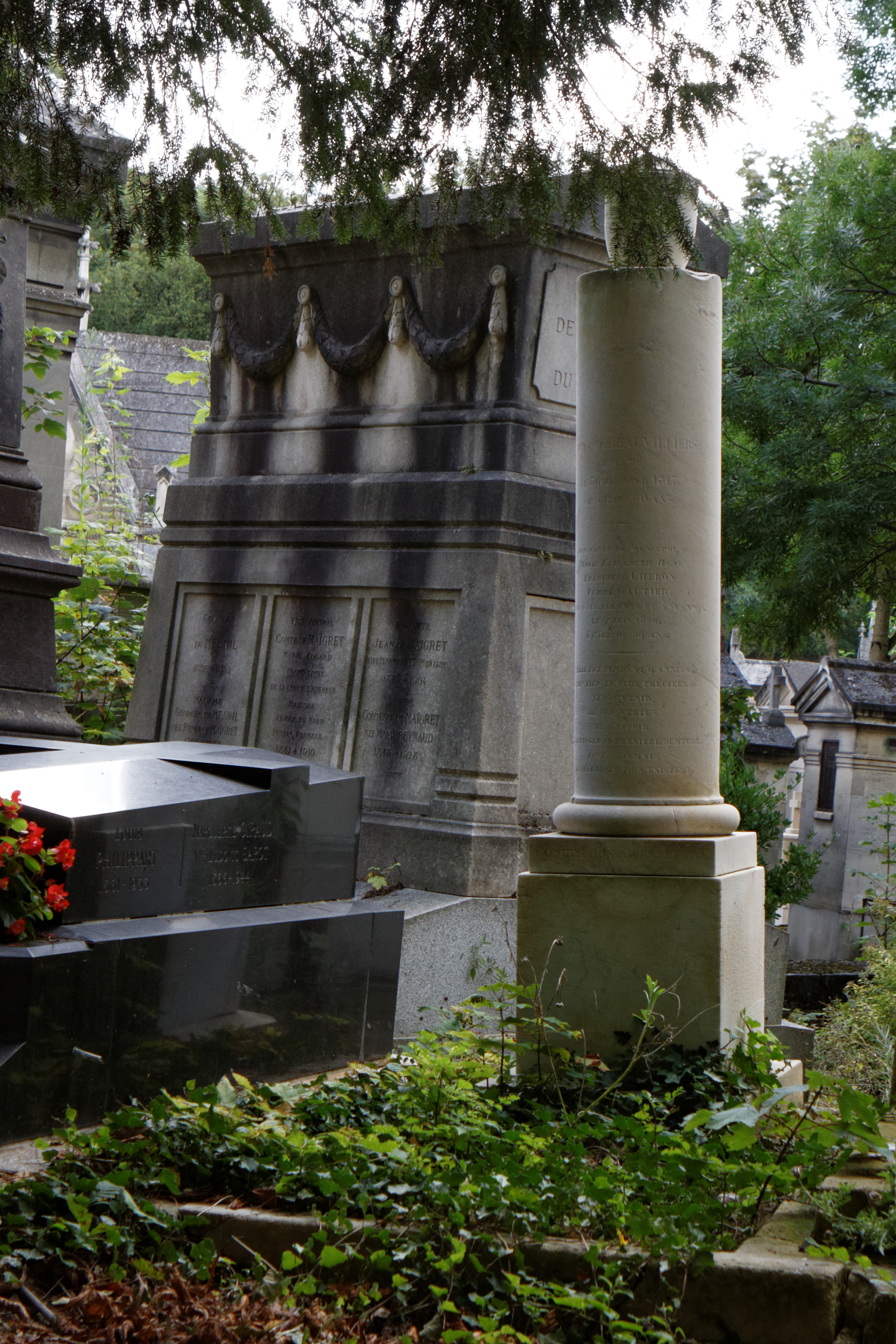
His grave at the Père-Lachaise Cemetery, Paris.

Antoine B. Beauvilliers (1754 – 31 January 1817) was a French restaurateur who opened the first grand restaurant in Paris and wrote the cookbook L'Art du Cuisinier. Jean Anthelme Brillat-Savarin considers him the most important of the early restaurateurs, as "he was the first to have an elegant dining room, handsome well-trained waiters, a fine cellar and a superior kitchen." Beauvilliers is described as a "portly figure, his triple chin, his broad, joyous face, and the light that sparkles in his large grey eye." He dressed fashionably and carried a sword. His success was enhanced by his ability to "cater to and flatter rich patrons", attending to them personally and helping them with items on the menu; he had a prodigious memory and could recall a patron he had not seen in 20 years. He is buried in Père Lachaise Cemetery (division 26).

== Career ==
=== Restaurateur ===
Of humble parentage, Beauvilliers worked his way up from kitchen boy to become the chef of Monsieur, the Count of Provence and future King Louis XVIII. Beauvilliers opened a restaurant called the La Grande Taverne de Londres in the Palais-Royal, Paris, sometimes between 1782 and 1786. The restaurant was intended for a wealthy and aristocratic clientele; it had tables made of mahogany, crystal chandeliers, and tablecloths of fine linen, an extensive wine cellar, and elegantly-dressed waiters. Dishes on the restaurant menu included partridge with cabbage, veal chops grilled in buttered paper, and duck with turnips. The restaurant Beauvilliers became a rendez-vous of conservative political factions, in which Beauvilliers was implicated; in 1795 he was forced to close his establishment and to live away from the trade that was his life. When he reopened La Grande Taverne de Londres, at 26 rue de Richelieu, tastes had changed and he met with less success. The restaurant closed in 1825.

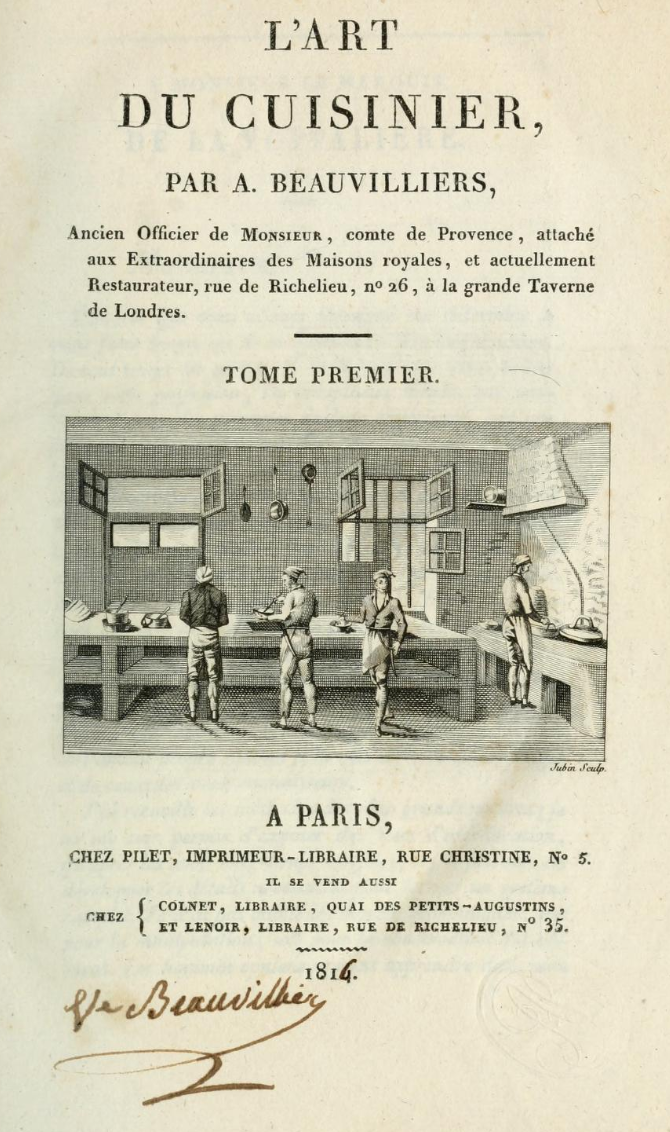
L'Art du Cuisinier, 1814

=== Cookbook writer ===
In 1814, he published the two-volume L'art du Cuisinier, with a great number of illustrative engravings. It became a classic of French gastronomic literature. A second edition, with a supplement, appeared in 1821. An English translation, The Art of French Cookery, was published in London in 1824.

== Bibliography ==
- L'art du Cuisinier, Paris: Pilet, 2 volumes in octavo, 1814 Gallica full text Internet Archive, full text; English translation, The Art of French Cookery, London: Longman, Hurst, Rees, Orme, Brown and Green, 1824.
