= A Gift to Young Housewives =

Cookbook by Elena Molokhovets

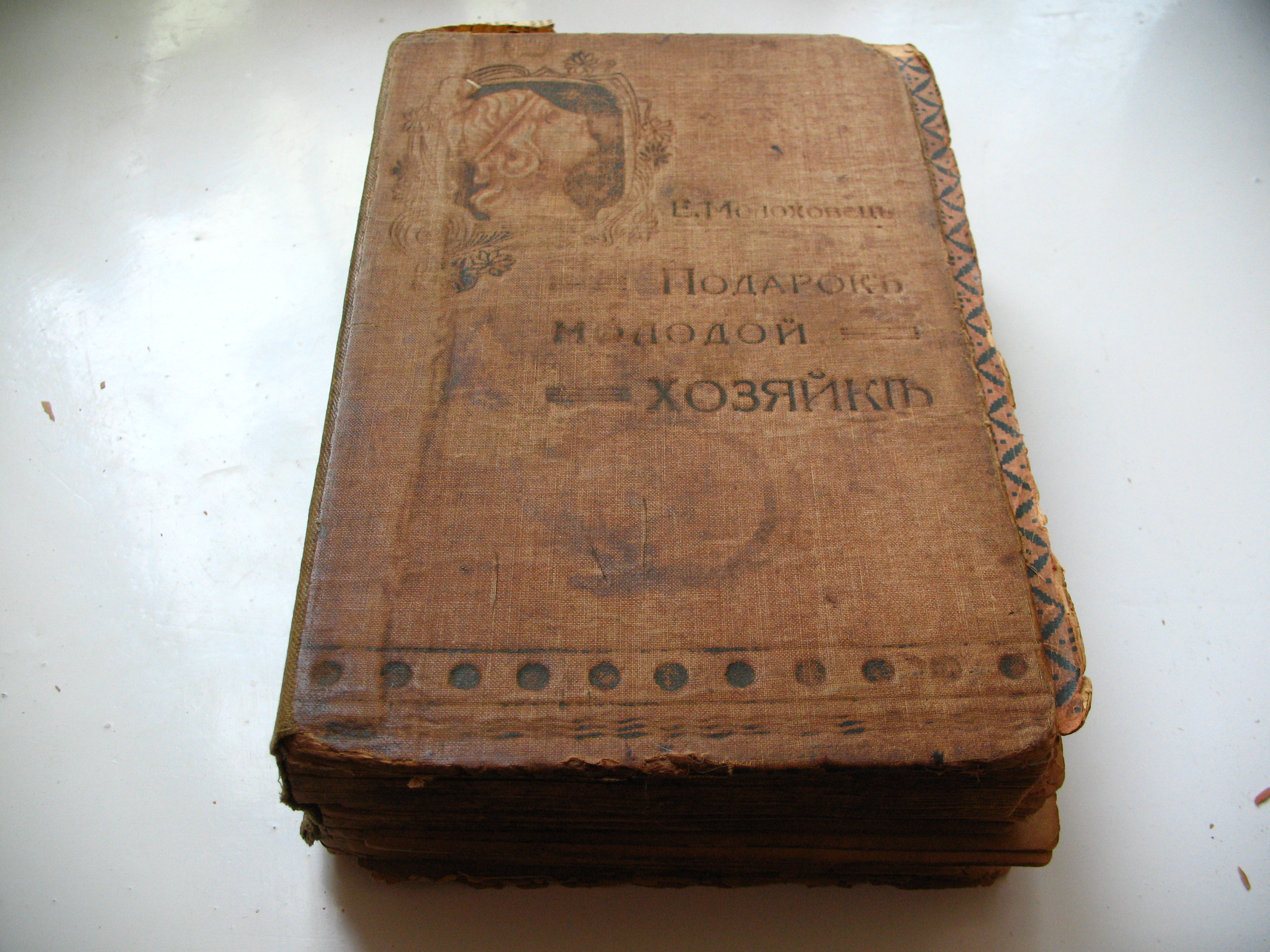
- The 1917 edition of the cookbook
- Author: Elena Molokhovets
- Original title: Пода́рок молоды́м хозя́йкам
- Language: Russian
- Genre: Cookbook
- Published: 1861
- Publication place: Russia

A Gift to Young Housewives (Russian: Пода́рок молоды́м хозя́йкам, romanized: Podarok molodym khozyaykam) is a Russian cookbook written and compiled by Elena Ivanovna Molokhovets and usually referred to as "Molokhovets" rather than its long title. It was the most successful book of its kind in the 19th and early 20th-century in Russia. Molokhovets revised the book continually between 1861 and 1917, a period of time falling between the emancipation of the serfs and the Communist Revolution. The book was well known in Russian households during publication and for decades afterwards. It was republished in 2003.

== Classic Russian cooking ==
The original series went through more than 20 editions and sold more than 295,000 copies. The book gave instructions for elaborate dishes like suckling pig, Madeira cake, and hazel grouse. Other recipes included soups, fritters, tortes, mushrooms, aspics, mousses, and dumplings. There were also instructions on making jam, mustard, and vodka. Although the number of recipes varied by edition, there were as many as 3,218 in the 1897 edition. The 1904 (24th) edition contained 4,163 recipes. In addition to recipes, the book covered cooking techniques, utensils and cooking equipment, stoves and ovens, household management, relations with servants, menus for feast days, and nutrition; it also gave time- and money-saving hints.

== Public reception ==
During the Soviet era, the book, written for the middle class and aristocrats, was condemned as "bourgeois and decadent", mainly because of its aristocratic tone. Also, it was mostly outdated for the 20th century, as it did not include usage of modern kitchen equipment: refrigerators, electric and gas ovens, etc.

In the post-war USSR, a time when people dealt with food shortages, long lines, and a scarcity of the necessary ingredients, cookbooks were mostly seen as a laughable anachronism. For example, one recipe for babka called for ingredients such as 60 to 70 eggs, which few people could afford at that time. But as life got better the need for cookbooks and complex recipes rose. In 1939, The Book of Tasty and Healthy Food was published as the acceptable Soviet analogue of the outdated Gift and as an everyday cookbook.

Recently "Molokhovets" has been regarded as a historical record and has been partially republished, its recipes offering a glimpse into traditional Russian cooking. For example, Andrew Whitley uses the book to inform his description of historical bread making processes and adapts some of its old recipes with modern techniques.

== Joyce Toomre ==
Joyce Toomre adapted and translated recipes and other content from the various editions into a 1992 book published as Classic Russian Cooking: Elena Molokhovets' a Gift to Young Housewives.

== See also ==
- Russian cuisine
