= Le Cuisinier Impérial =

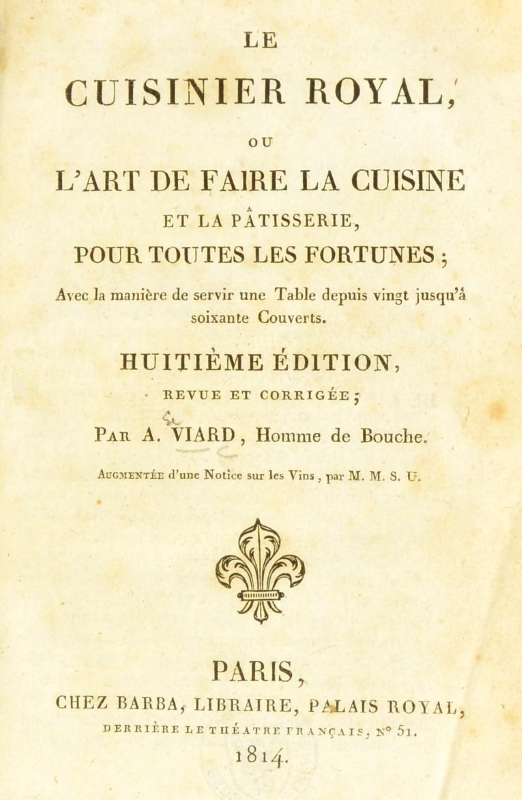
Title page of Le Cuisinier Royal, ex-Le Cuisinier Impérial

André Viard's Le Cuisinier Impérial (Paris: J.-N. Barba, 1806) was a culinary encyclopedia that passed through at least thirty-two editions in its long career as the essential reference work for the French professional chef during the nineteenth century. During its long run it was a staple of its publisher, J.-N. Barba, who warned potential literary pirates, in an age before the enforcement of copyright, of his intention to prosecute any editors of cookbooks who took, in whole or part, any recipes from the publication.

André Viard, who called himself "Homme de Bouche", was the chef de cuisine to Louis Philippe, comte de Ségur and Francis Egerton, 8th Earl of Bridgewater. The cookbook appeared under various titles that reflected regime changes: with the restoration of the Bourbons it became Le Cuisinier Royal (Paris: Barba, 1817) in its ninth edition, and in 1852, in its twenty-second edition, Le Cuisinier National. The co-author Fouret appeared in editions of the 1820s. Its last edition appeared in 1875.

Viard's rival in French kitchens was Marie-Antoine Carême's L'Art de la cuisine française au dix-neuvième siècle, the first volume of which appeared in 1833.

A German translation was published as Viard und Fourets Universal-Kochbuch (Stuttgart, Carl Hoffmann, 1827). A second edition was credited to Catharina Löffler, Pariser Kochbuch (Stuttgart, Weise and Stoppani, 1829).

An earlier, unrelated cookbook with a similar name, François Massialot's Le Cuisinier Royal et Bourgeois, one of the first French cookbooks, consisted of recipes from Louis XIV's kitchens and marked the beginning of haute cuisine.
