= Kotelett =

German sliced meat dish

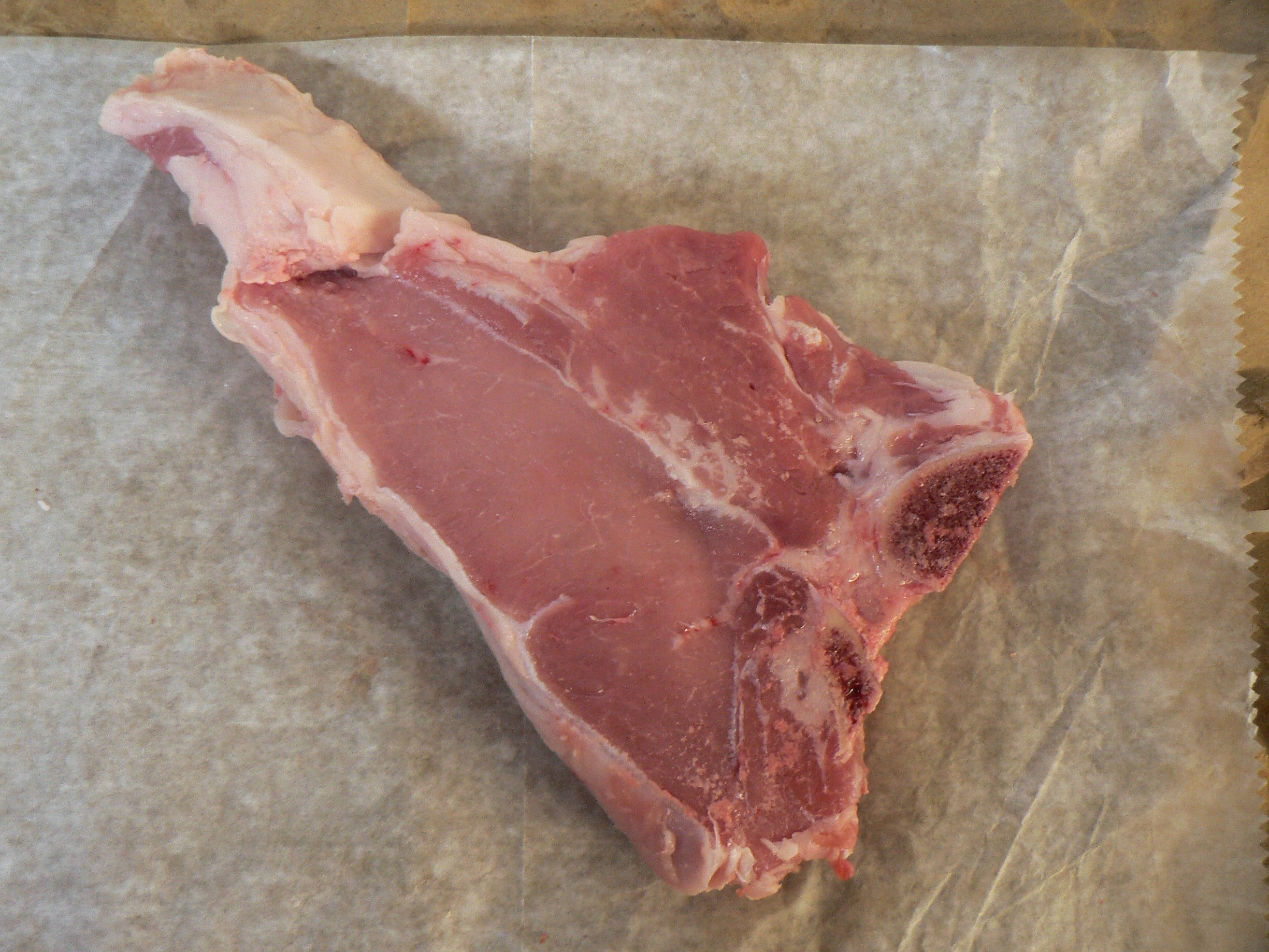
Raw kotelett from veal

Koteletts (Fr. côtelette „chop“, from Fr. côte resp. Lat. costa „rib“), also known as Karree, Karbonade or cutlets, are a German meat dish made of slices of meat from the rib area, including the bone. The piece of rib is found on both sides of the spine behind the neck. Koteletts are typically offered from pork, veal and mutton, but they can also come from beef.

Usually, koteletts are served either roasted or grilled, but in some cases they are also served breaded (cf. breaded cutlet).

== Kinds of meat used for koteletts ==
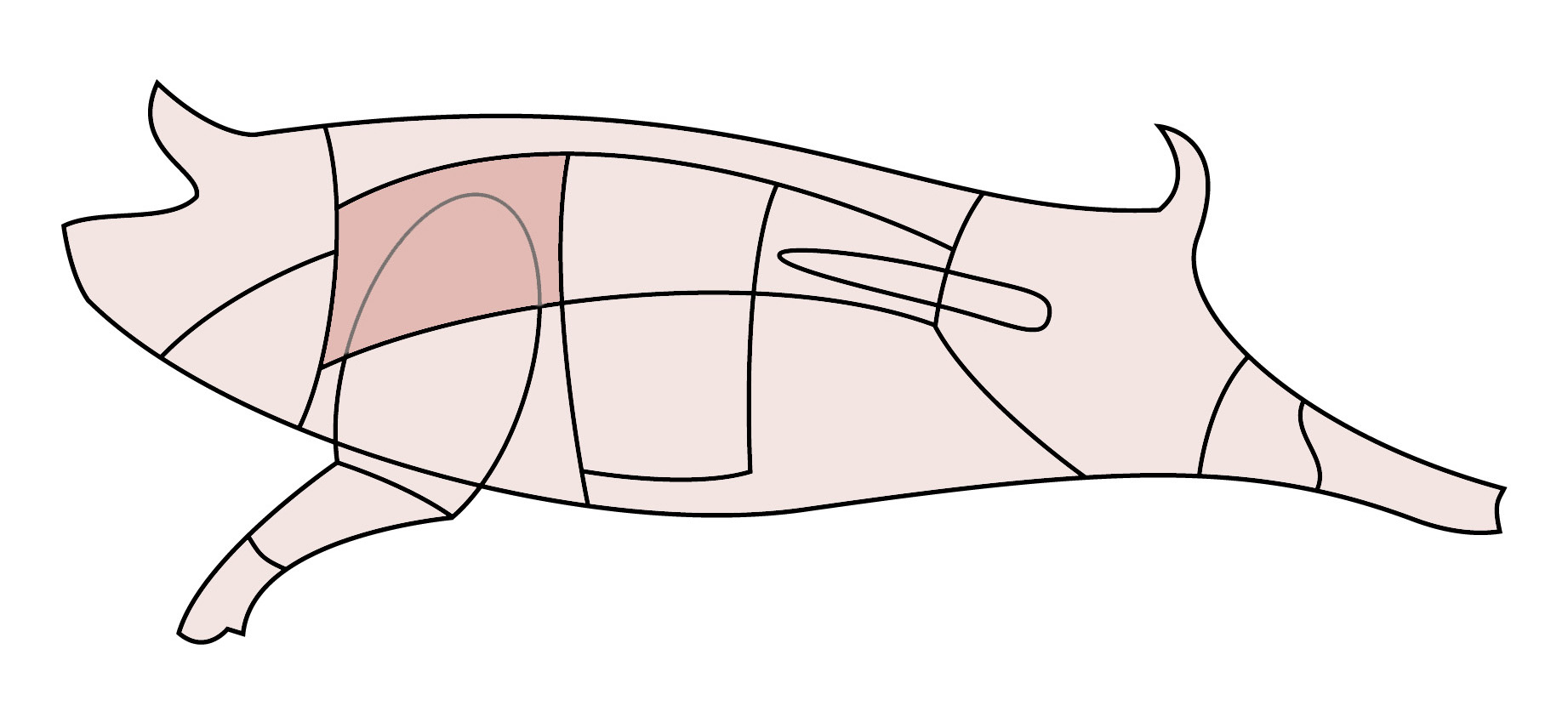
Pork: front or neck kotelett

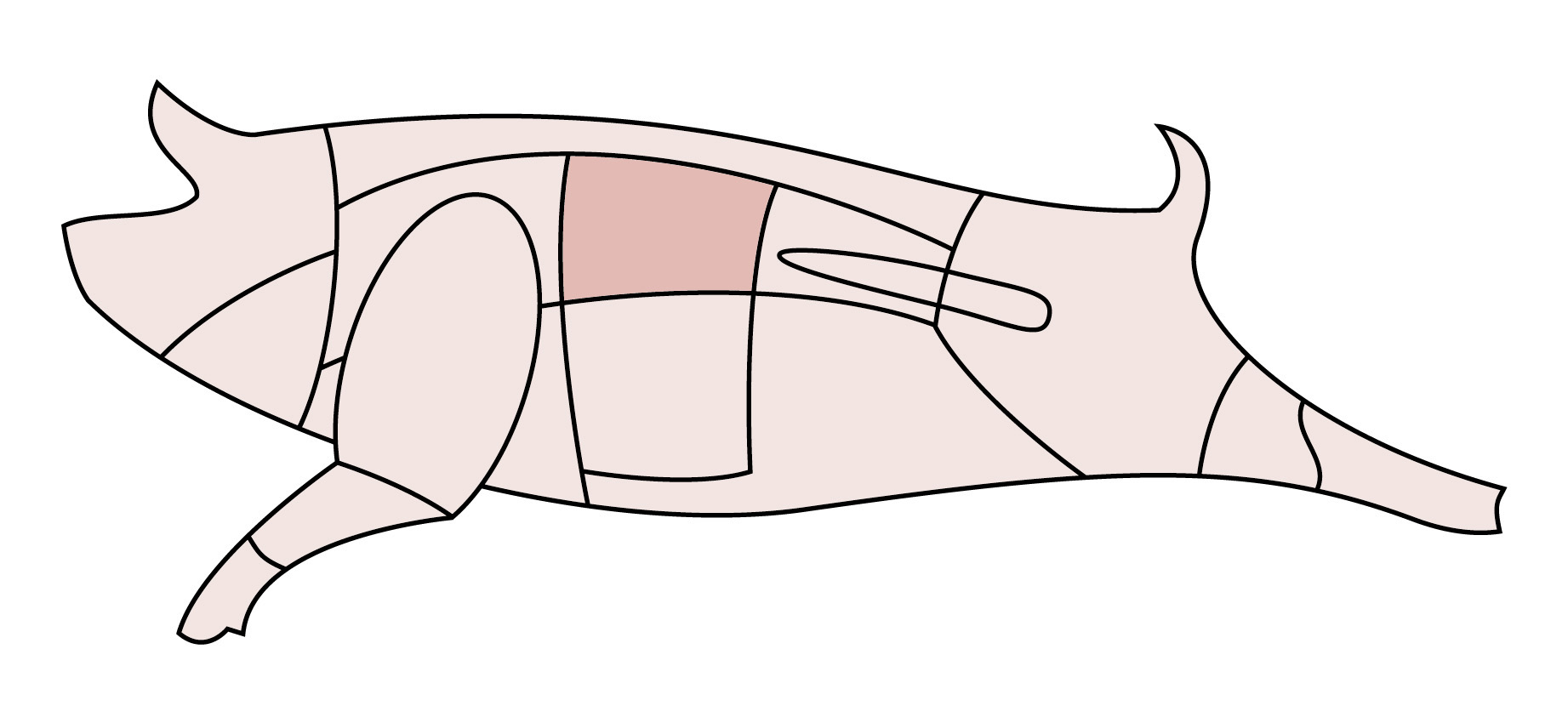
Pork: middle kotelett

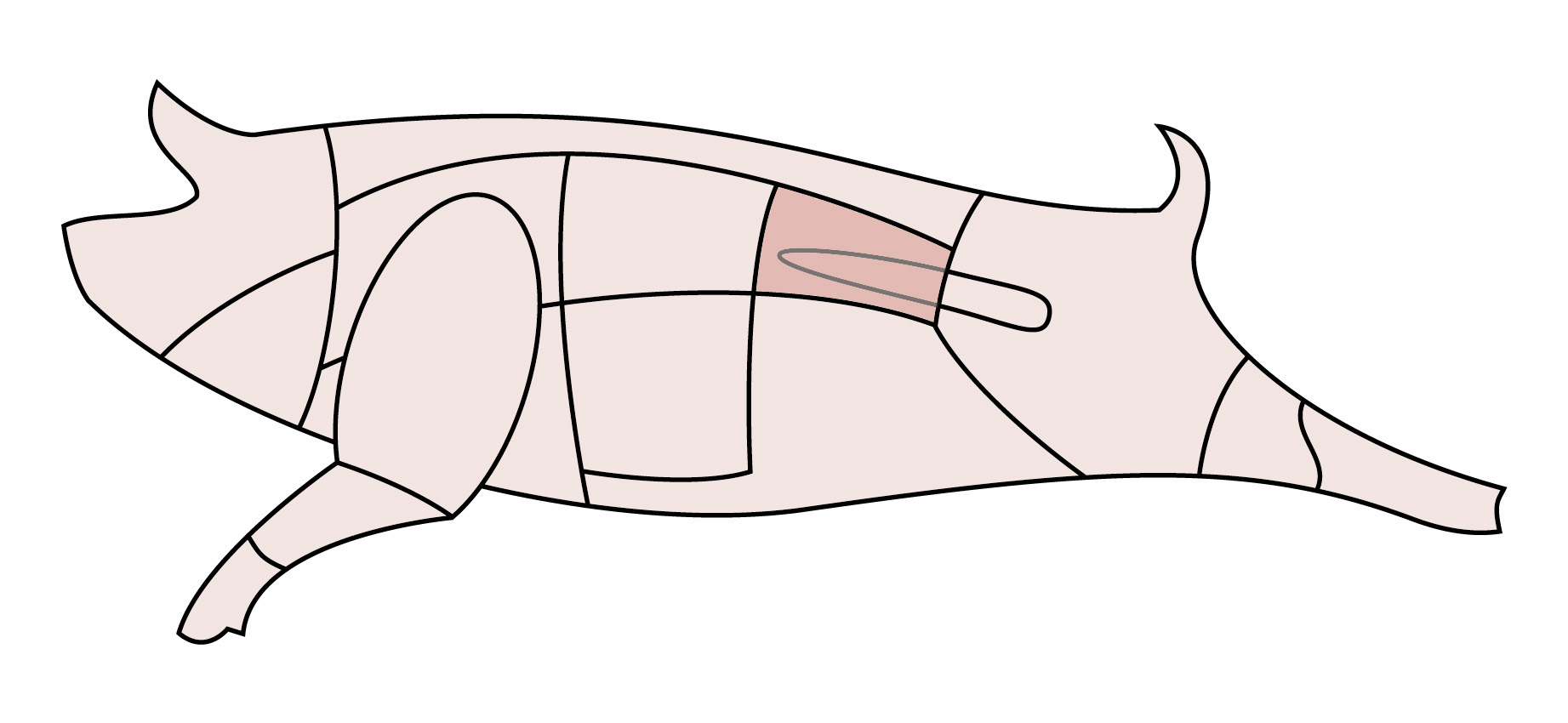
Pork: hind or fillet kotelett

=== Pork ===
The part where the koteletts are taken from reaches from the front to the hind leg. Due to the proximity to the neck, koteletts taken from the front are also known as "Nackenkotelett" (lit. neck kotelett) in Germany or "Halskotelett" in Switzerland. The middle ones are known as "Stielkotelett" or "Rippenkotelett" (lit. rib kotelett) due to the long and closely fitting rib cage. The hind koteletts, including parts of the fillet, are known as "Lummerkotelett", "Lendenkotelett" or "Filetkotelett" (lit. loin kotelett or fillet kotelett) in Germany or "Nierenstück" (en. loin) in Switzerland. These hind koteletts are especially low on bones and fat.

=== Veal ===
Only the front part of the ribs are used to make koteletts when speaking of veal. The hind part of the ribs is typically sold without the bones.

=== Mutton ===
Similarly to the veal, koteletts from mutton are taken from the front or middle part of the ribs only.

=== Beef ===
The front kotelett of the beef is known as "Hochrippe" (lit. high ribs) and is usually used as boiled beef, goulash or, without the bones, as steak. The hind kotelett or the beef is known in two variants: with ribs and without. Together with the fillet, it is similar to the t-bone steak. Without bones, it is also sold as Roastbeef or rump steak.

=== Fish ===
In some instances, the slices of fish with several centimeters of thickness that are cut vertically from the spine are known as koteletts as well. They are typically cut from bigger fish such as cod.

== Trivia ==
In Switzerland, the popular Cervelat sausage is also known as the 'working man's kotelett'.

== Dish variants ==
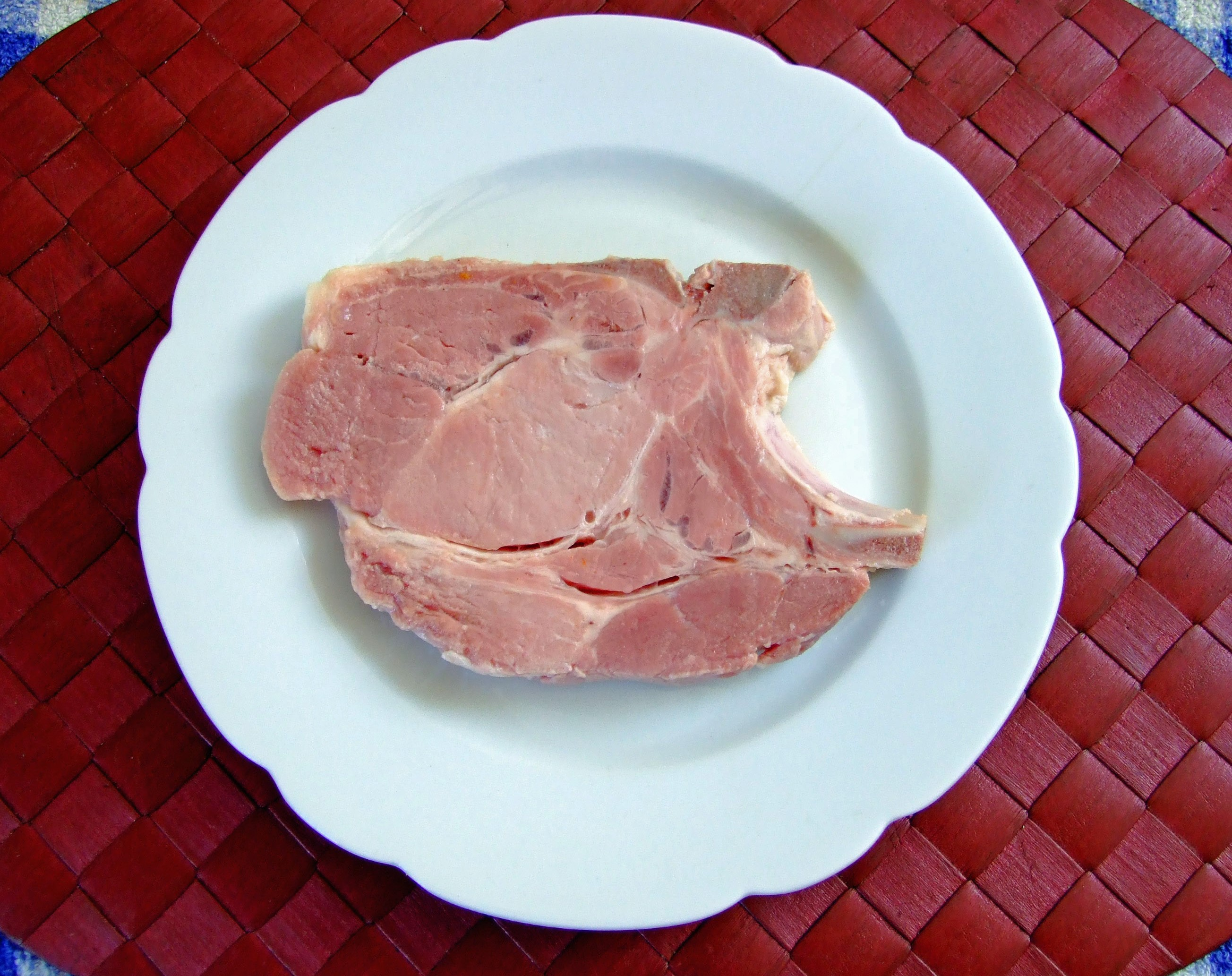
Salted and boiled pork kotelett

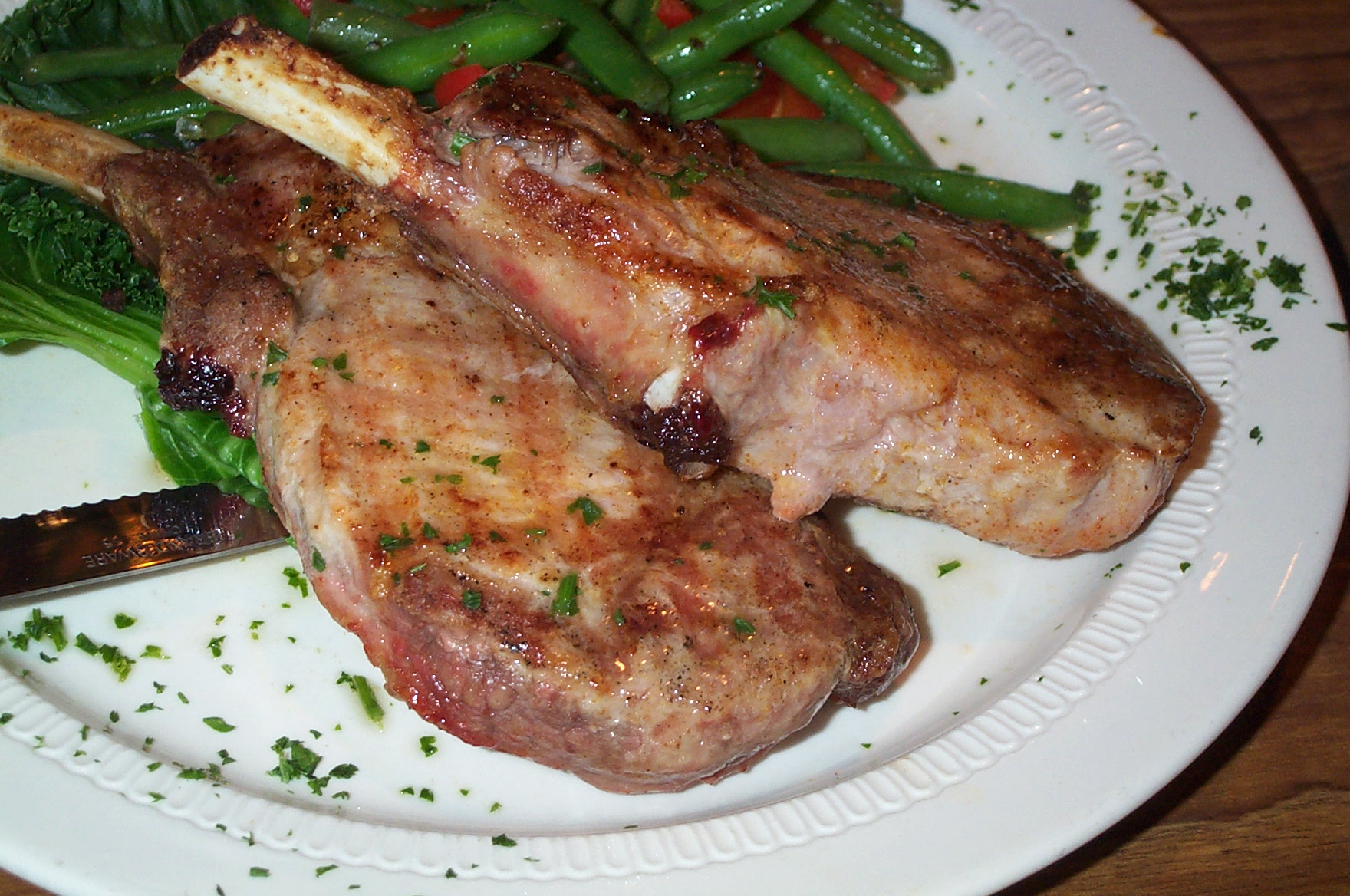
Grilled pork koteletts

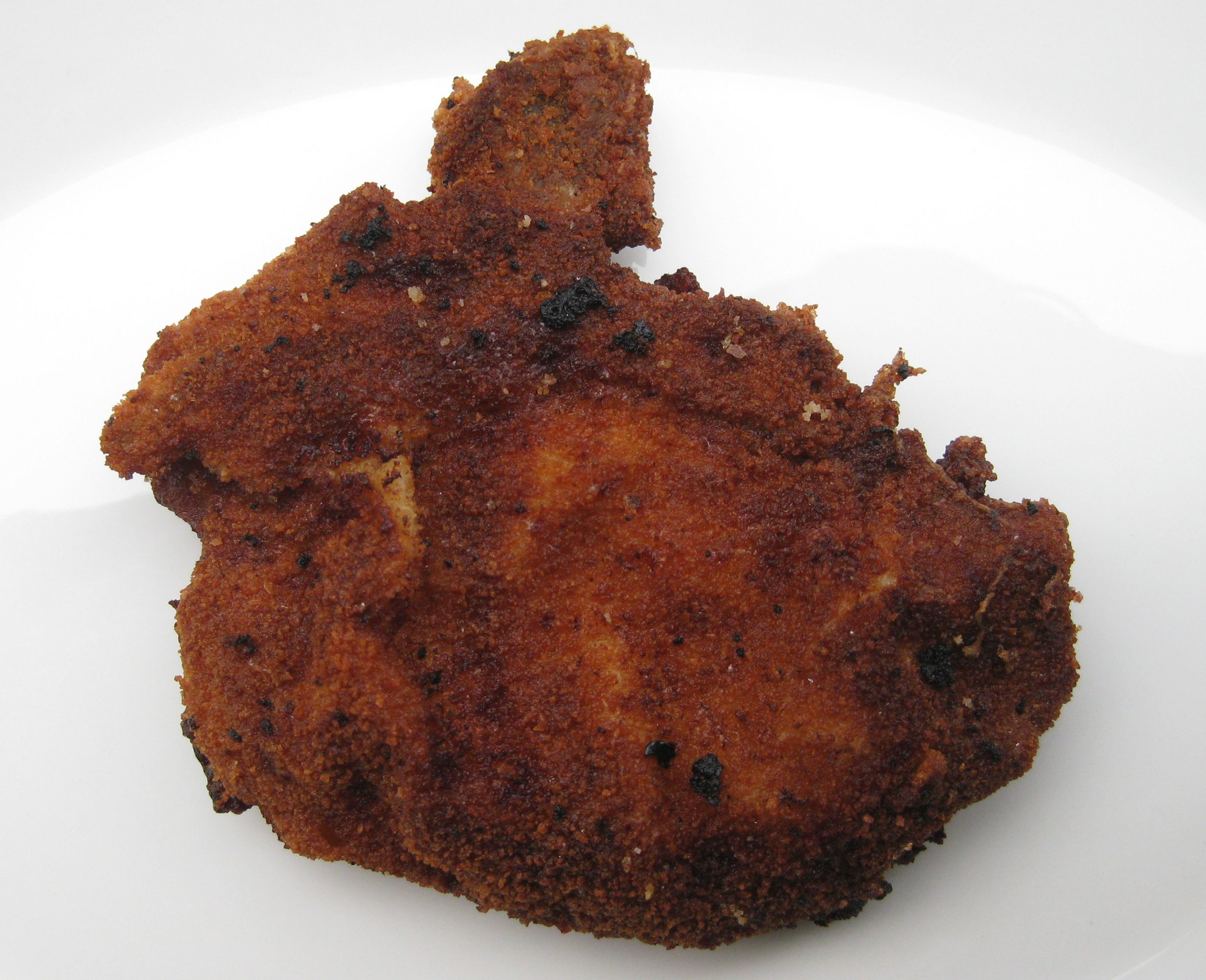
Fried and breaded pork kotelett

== See also ==
- Cotoletta
- Veal Milanese
- Milanesa
- Piccata
- Scaloppine
- Escalope
- Kotlet schabowy
- Schnitzel
- Wiener Schnitzel
- Tonkatsu
