= Cutlet =

Food (often sliced meat)

In cuisine, cutlet (derived from French côtelette, côte, 'rib') refers to:

1. a thin slice of meat from the leg or ribs of mutton, veal, pork, or chicken
2. a dish made of such slice, often breaded (also known in various languages as a cotoletta, Kotellet, kotlet or kotleta)
3. a croquette or cutlet-shaped patty made of ground meat
4. a kind of fish cut where the fish is sliced perpendicular to the spine, rather than parallel (as with fillets); often synonymous with steak
5. a prawn or shrimp with its head and outer shell removed, leaving only the flesh and tail
6. a mash of vegetables (usually potatoes) fried with bread

== American and Canadian cuisines ==
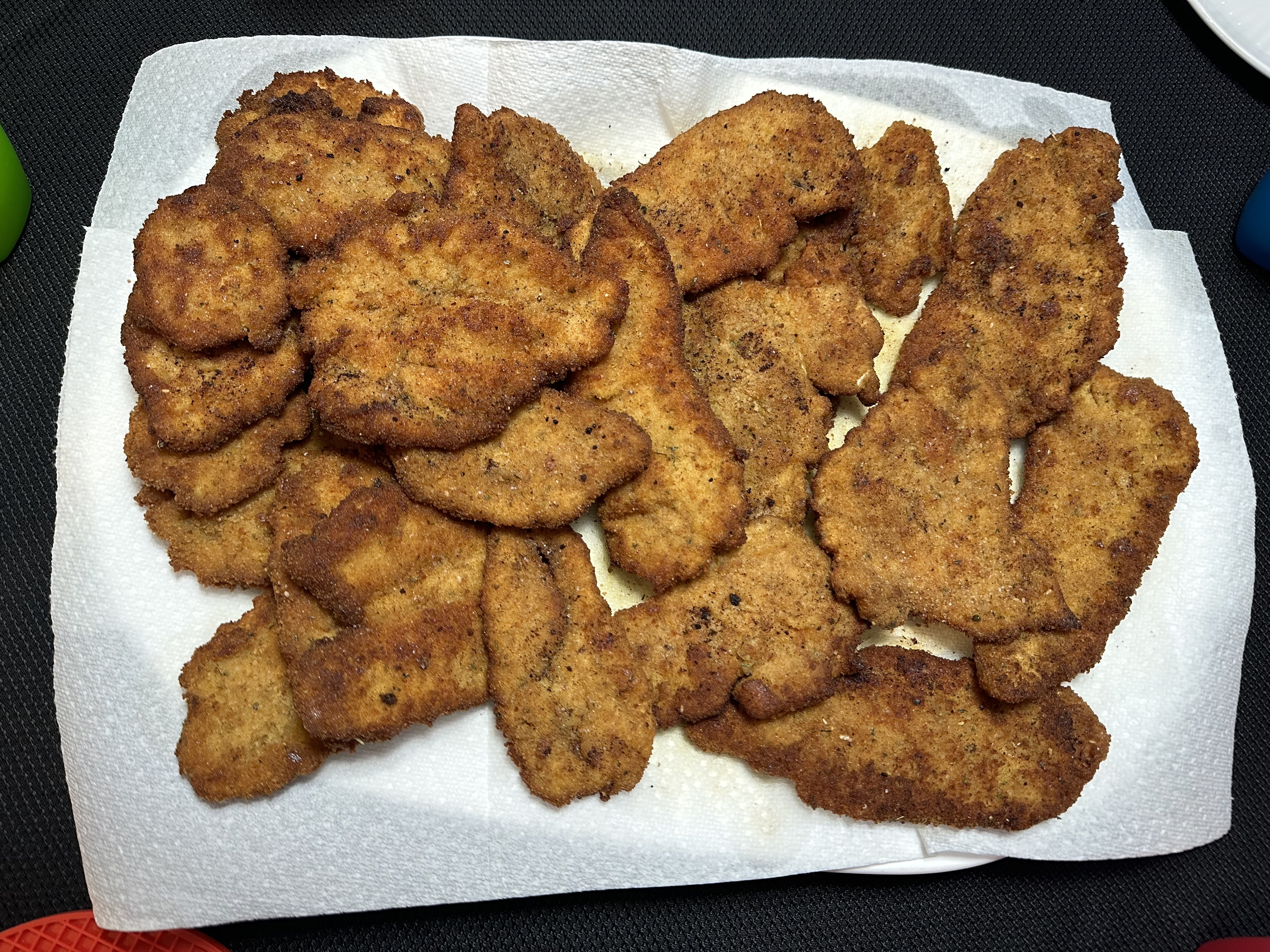
A tray of Italian-American style chicken cutlets

From the late 1700s until about 1900, virtually all recipes for "cutlets" in English-language cookbooks referenced veal cutlets. Then pork cutlets began to appear. More recently, in American and Canadian cuisine, cutlets have also been made using chicken, although this was also imported from Europe. The cutlet is usually coated with flour, egg and bread crumbs, then fried in a pan with some oil.

== Australian cuisine ==
Australians eat lamb cutlets battered with egg yolk and breadcrumbs. Chicken cutlets are also very popular, but known as chicken schnitzel. Both lamb cutlets and chicken schnitzel are a staple of Australian children's cuisine. Amongst most Australians of Italian descent, the term schnitzel is replaced by the term cutlet. Cutlets amongst this population are usually veal or chicken.

== British cuisine ==
In British cuisine, a cutlet is usually unbreaded and can also be called a chop. If referring to beef, more than one piece together would be generally called a rib of beef or a rib joint, whilst lamb ribs are called a rack, or rack of lamb. Lamb racks can also be tied into a circular shape before cooking, with the ribs on the outside, giving a crown shape, leading to the name "crown of lamb".

== French cuisine ==
In France, cutlets can be made with any of the Salpicons of poultry, game, fish and shellfish, mixed with the necessary amount of forcemeat in keeping with the main ingredient; the consistency should be adjusted with a little well-reduced sauce which should also be in keeping with the ingredients. These cutlets should be egg and crumbed and they should be shallow fried and coloured in clarified butter instead of being deep fried.

Another kind of cutlet is the Côtelette Menon or Côtelette révolution which is a veal cutlet covered in bread crumbs and fried in butter.

== Hong Kong cuisine ==
In Hong Kong, the cutlet was introduced during the period of British colonial occupation along with other cooking influences. It is seen as "sai chaan" or Western cuisine. Veal, pork and chicken are battered and deep fried for lunch. Seafood such as shrimp or scallop that is battered or breaded and deep fried can also be known as 'cutlet' in Hong Kong. It is usually served alongside rice or spaghetti noodles.

== Indian cuisine ==
Indian cutlet at MTR Bengaluru (2026)

In Indian cuisine, a cutlet specifically refers to mashed vegetables (potatoes, carrots, beans) or cooked meat (mutton, chicken, pork or fish) stuffing that is fried with a batter/covering. The meat itself is cooked with spices - onion, cardamom, cloves, cinnamon, coriander (cilantro), green chillies, lemon and salt. This is then dipped in an egg mix or corn starch and then in bread crumbs (also see breaded cutlet), and fried in ghee or vegetable oil. Chicken and mutton cutlets are popular snacks in the eastern part of India, especially in Kolkata.

The vegetarian version has no meat in it, instead the filling is a combination of mashed potatoes, onion, green chillies, spices and salt. This version is more popular with the vegetarian Indian population. This should not be confused with grilled patties such as aloo tikki. A cutlet is traditionally deep-fried.

== Iranian cuisine ==
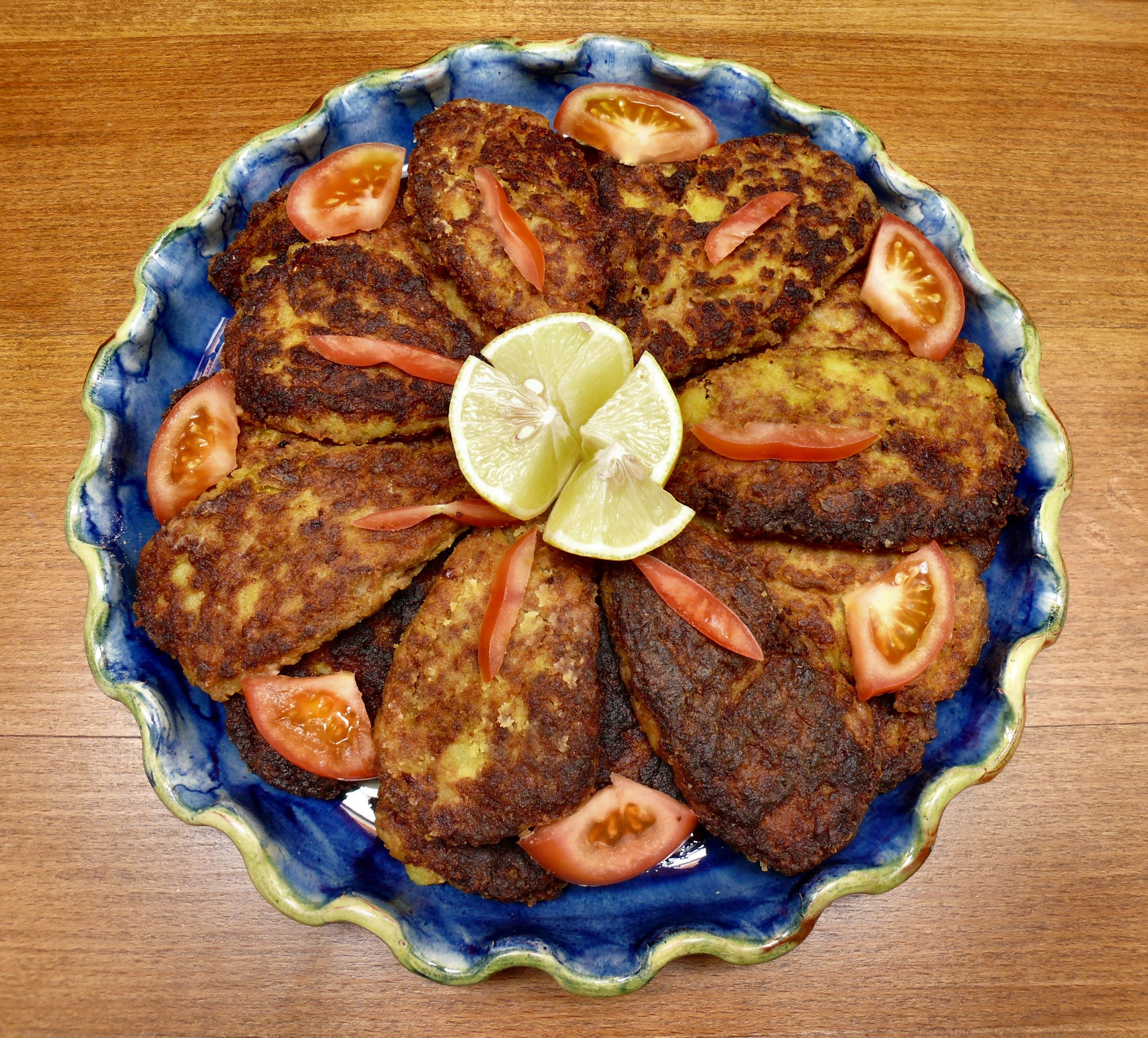
Iranian cutlets

In Iran, cutlet (Persian: کُتلت) is a popular hamburger-like thin layered mixture of fried ground beef or lamb or sometimes chicken, mashed or grated potatoes, eggs, onions, spices, shaped like a flower leaf, with a thin layer of wheat flour for coating; which is deep fried, usually served with tomato, onion, parsley and bread.

Some opponents of the Islamic Republic of Iran have used the term "cutlet" to describe a recently deceased individual with significant ties to the Islamic Republic of Iran and IRGC (especially officials, security figures, or hardliners). It is used humorously to refer to high-profile deaths by airstrikes or explosions, and has led to arrests such as in the case of a doctor who posted a picture of a cutlet on Instagram.

== Italian cuisine ==
The use of the cutlet (cotoletta) is quite widespread in Italian cuisine in many different variations. The most famous variant is the Milanese cutlet (cotoletta alla milanese), a veal cutlet covered in bread crumbs and fried in butter. It should not be mistaken for the Wiener schnitzel (which should be referred as a scaloppina alla viennese, or as fettina impanata in Italian), which is a different cut of meat; the Milanese cutlet cut includes the bone, whereas the Wiener schnitzel does not. The dish has a French origin and was brought to Milan during the Napoleonic wars.

== Japanese cuisine ==
The cutlet was introduced to Japan during the late 19th century. The Japanese pronunciation of cutlet is katsuretsu. In Japanese cuisine, katsuretsu or shorter katsu is actually a breaded cutlet. Dishes with katsu include tonkatsu (pork), katsudon (simmered with beaten egg and poured over a bowl of rice) and katsu curry.

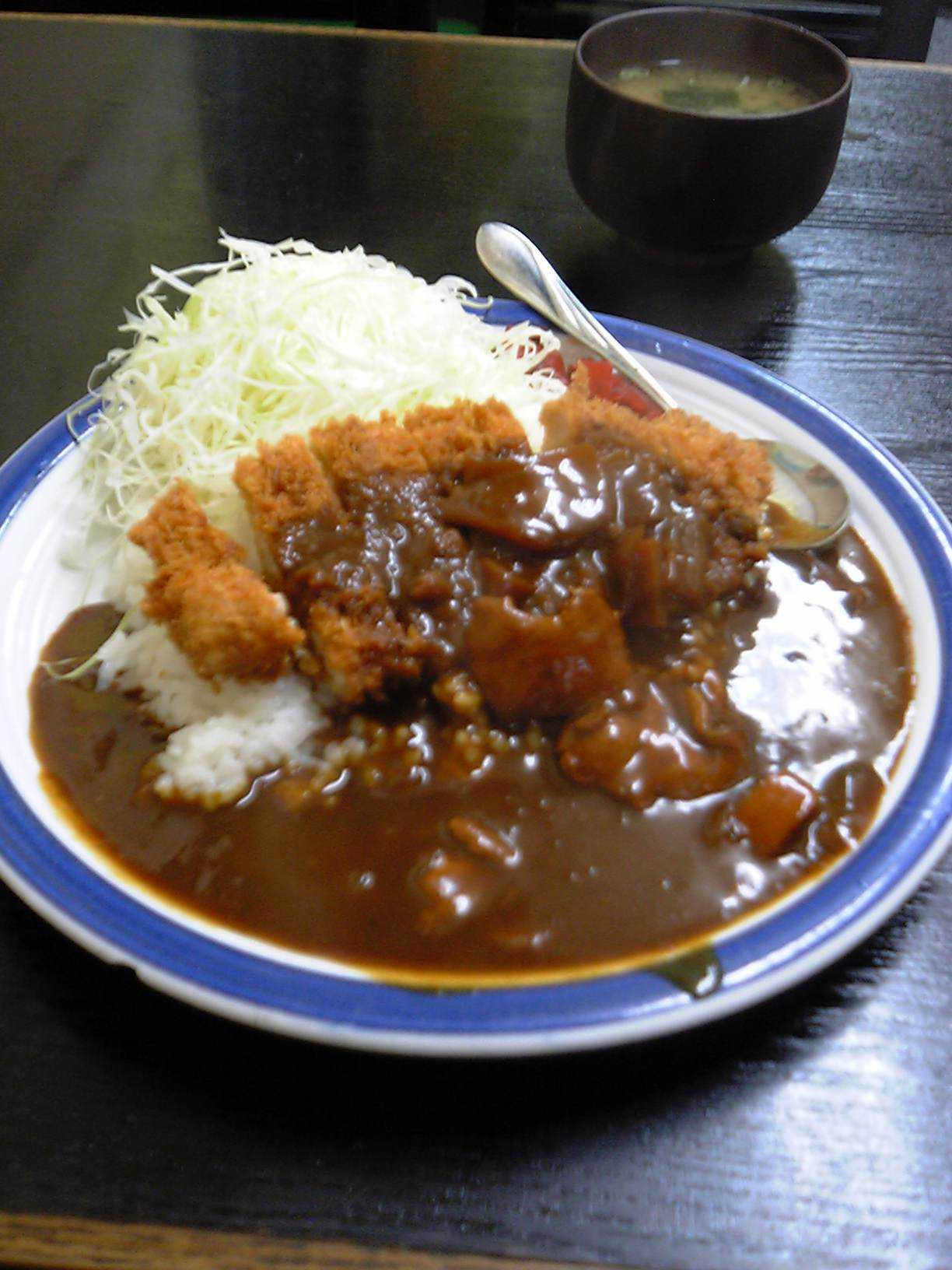
Katsukarē (cutlet curry rice)

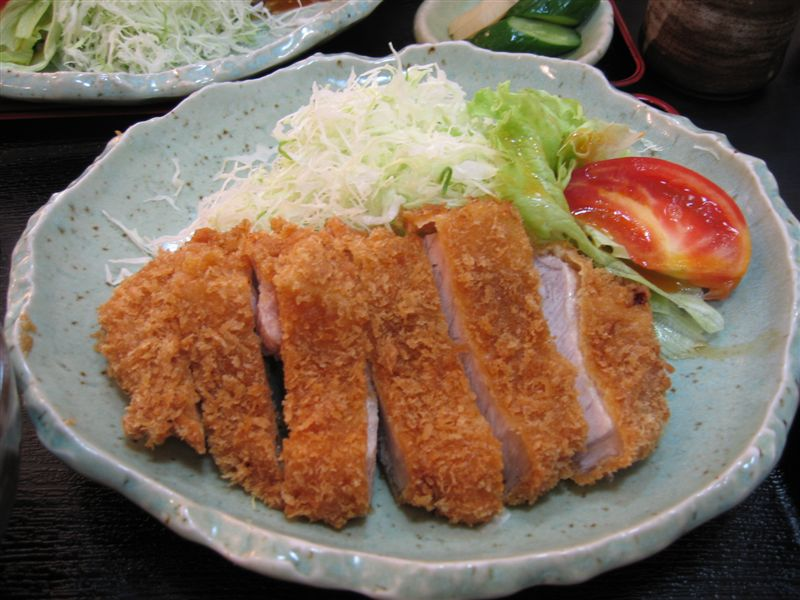
Tonkatsu (pork cutlet)

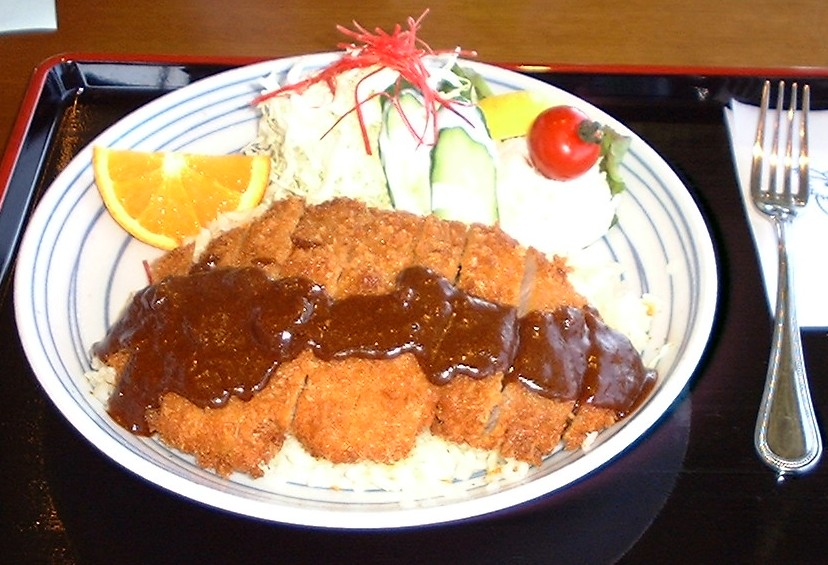
Nemuro-style esukaroppu ("escalope") — tonkatsu with demi-glace

== Polish cuisine ==
The Polish pork cutlet, kotlet schabowy, is a pork chop coated with breadcrumbs. Kotlet schabowy can be served with mashed potatoes, home fries, fried mushrooms, cooked vegetables (cabbage), with salads or with coleslaw. Kotlet z kurczaka is a chicken cutlet coated with breadcrumbs. Kotlet z indyka is a turkey cutlet coated with breadcrumbs.

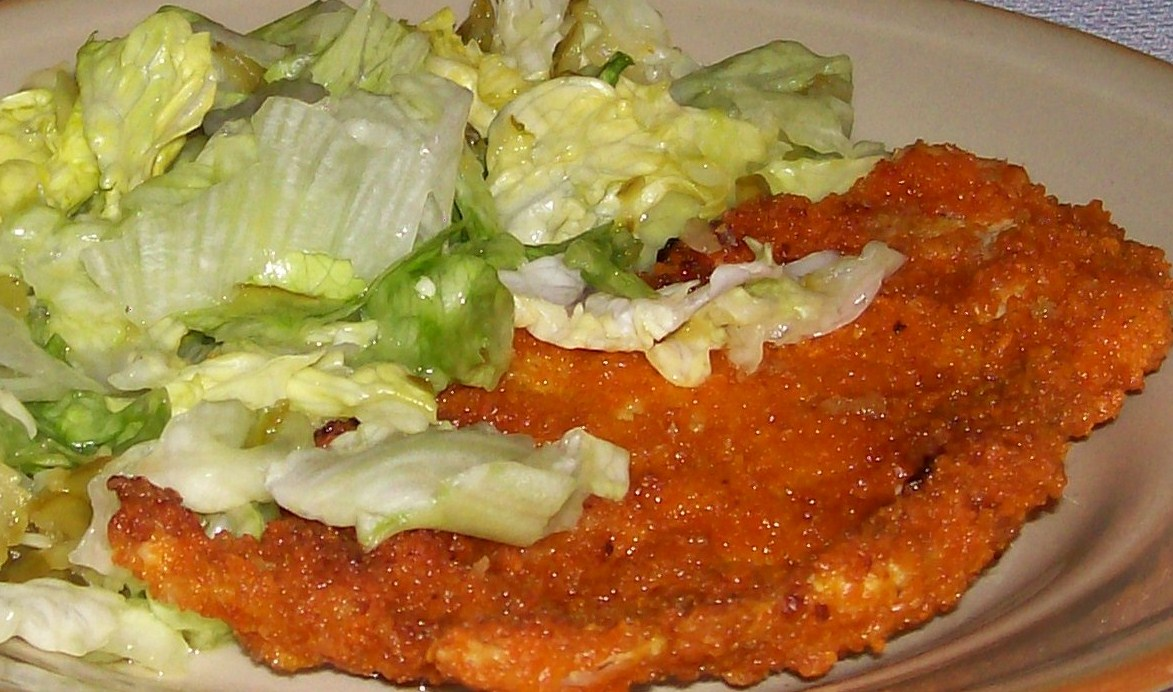
Polish kotlet z kurczaka breaded chicken cutlet with cabbage salad

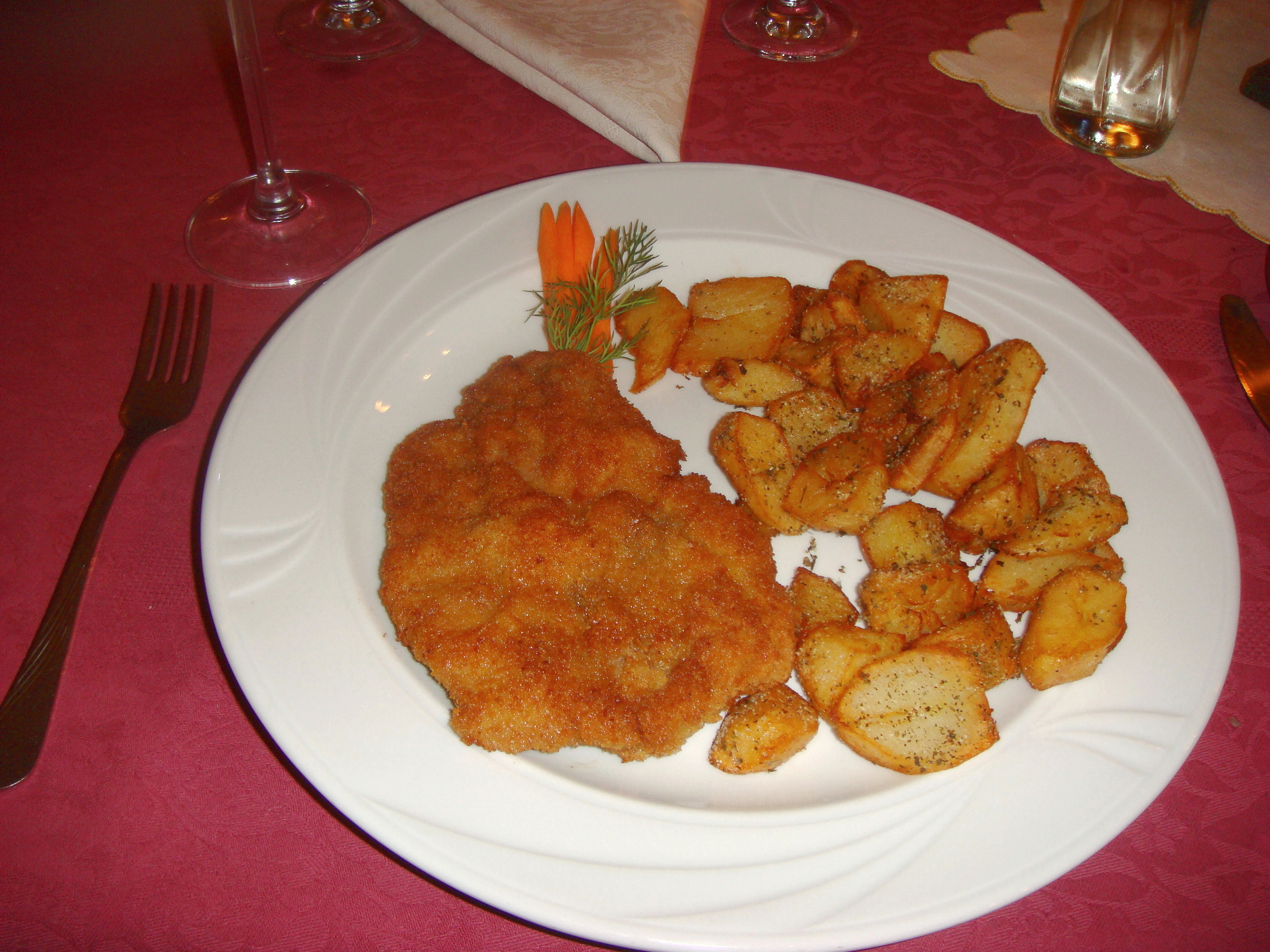
One of the typical ways of serving kotlet schabowy pork cutlet: on a plate with home fries.

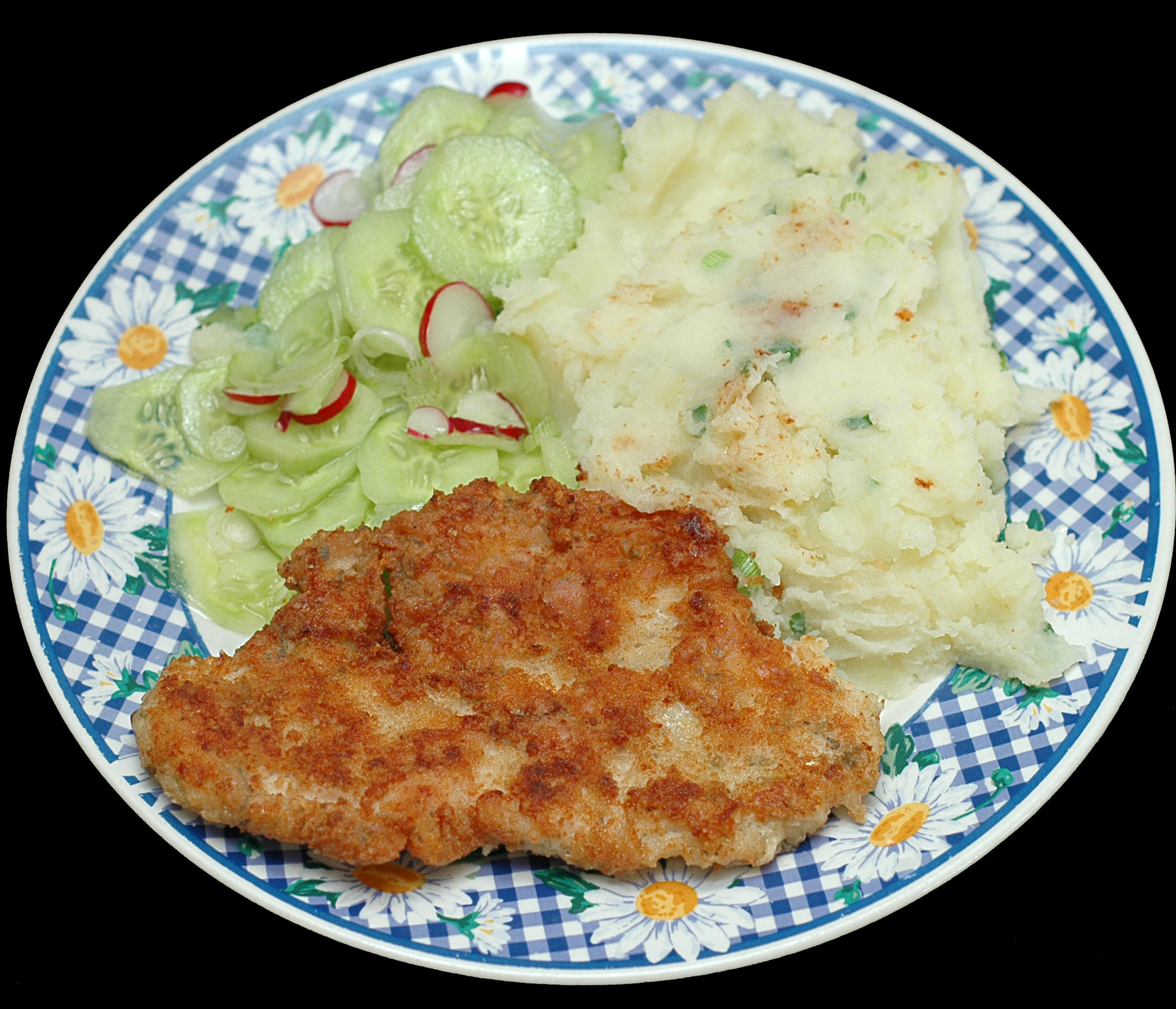
Kotlet z indyka turkey cutlet with spring onion mashed potato, cucumber and radish salad

== Russian cuisine ==
In modern Russian, the word kotleta (котлета) refers almost exclusively to pan-fried minced meat croquettes / cutlet-shaped patties. Bread soaked in milk, onions, garlic, and herbs is usually present in the recipe. When in a hurry, a "cutlet" can be eaten between bread slices like a hamburger, but this fast meal is rarely served in restaurants. It is usually served with pan-fried potatoes, mashed potatoes, pasta, etc.

In the middle of the 20th century, industrially produced, semi-processed ground meat cutlets were introduced in the USSR. Colloquially known as Mikoyan cutlets (named after Soviet politician Anastas Mikoyan, who served as a minister of the food industry from 1934 to 1938 he was responsible for introducing a lot of industrial-made products into the Soviet food chain), these were cheap pork or beef cutlet-shaped patties which resembled hamburger patties.

A particular form of the Russian kotleta known as Pozharsky cutlet is an elaborated version of minced poultry kotleta covered with breadcrumbs or small croutons. A distinct feature of this cutlet is that butter is added to minced meat, which results in an especially juicy and tender consistency.

Another Russian version of a cutlet, called otbivnaya kotleta (отбивная котлета), meaning "beaten cutlet", is a fried slice of meat, usually pork or beef, beaten flat with a tenderizing hammer or knife handle and covered with beaten eggs, dough or breadcrumbs. The recipe is similar to those of escalopes, schnitzel, Polish, or American cutlets. Today, this dish is simply called otbivnaya, with the word kotleta reserved for minced meat patties.

Chicken Kiev is called kotleta po-kievski (котлета по-киевски) in Russian which means "Kyiv-style cutlet".

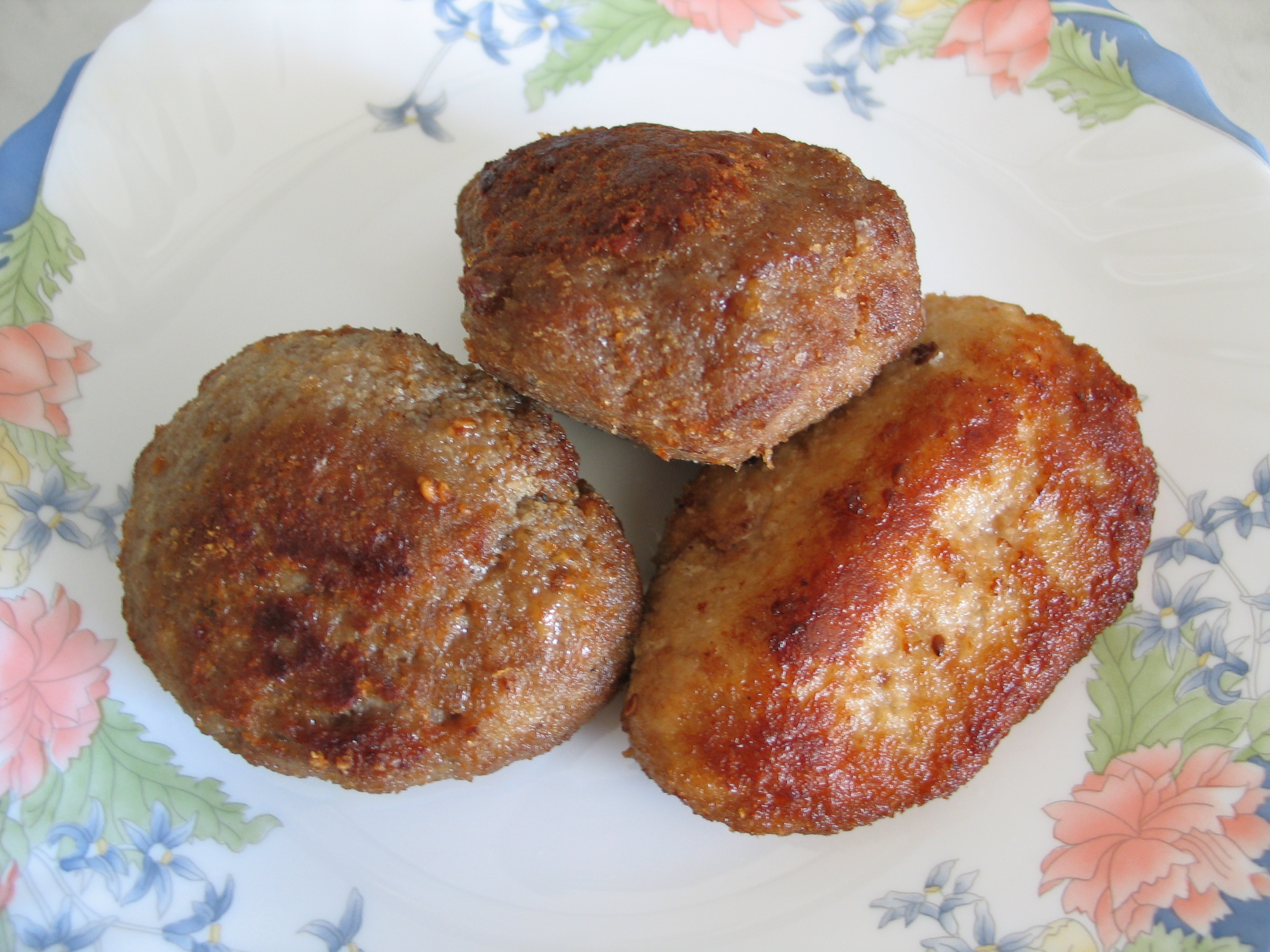
Two minced pork and one chicken kotleta

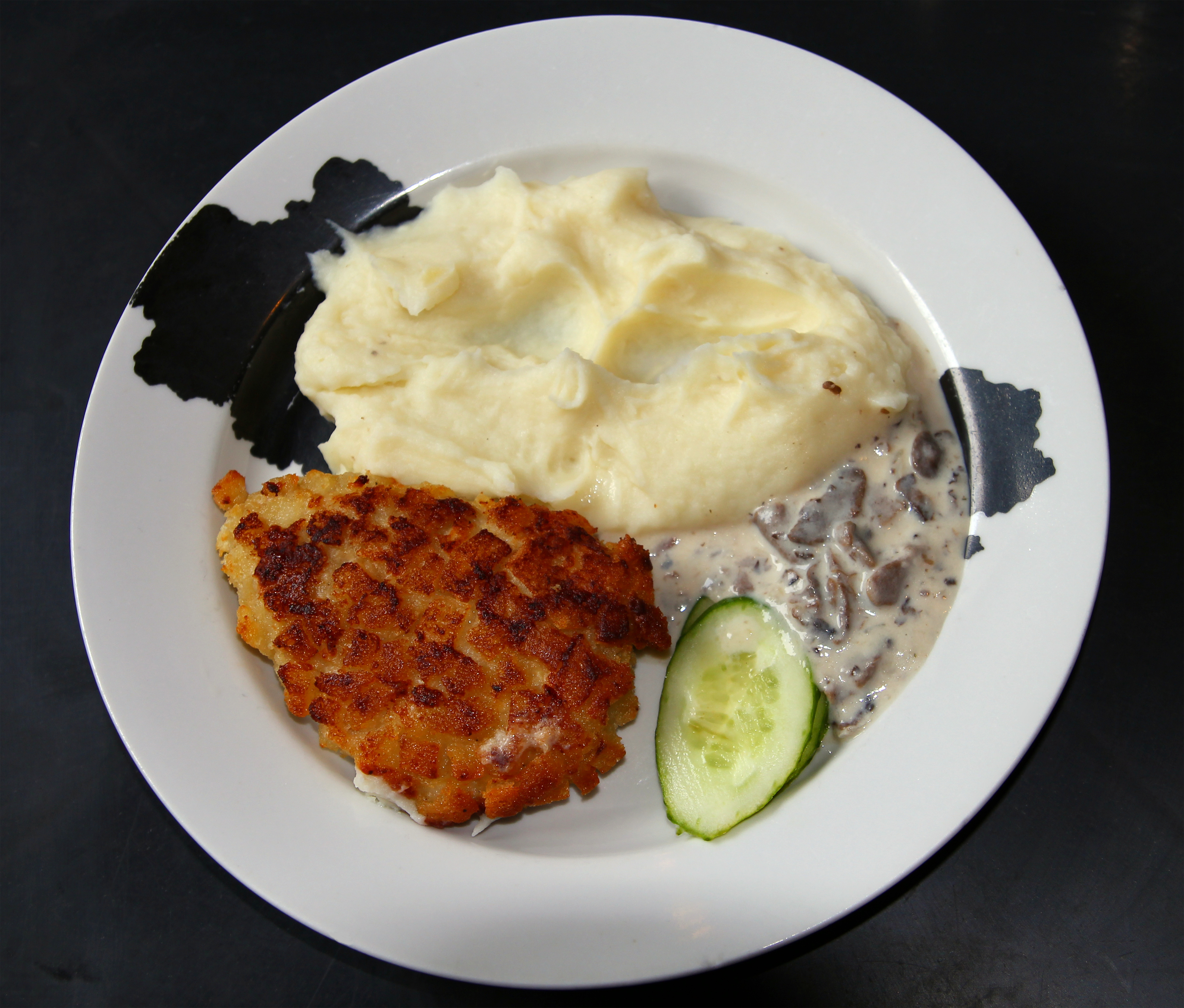
Pozharskaya kotleta served with mashed potatoes and a mushroom sauce

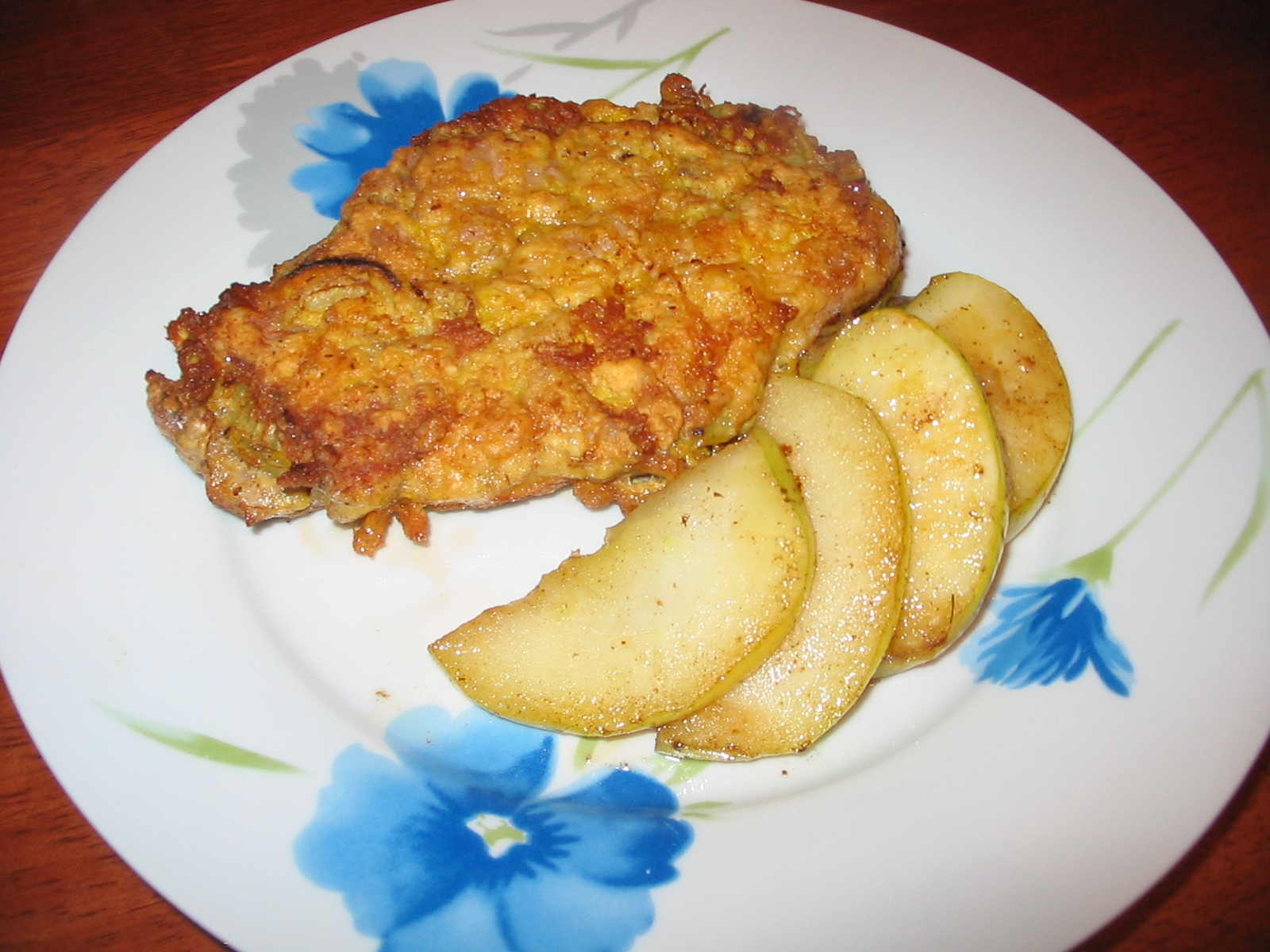
Otbivnaya kotleta

== Ukrainian cuisine ==
In Ukrainian Kotleta (Ukrainian: котлета) may refer both to a single serving of meat (fried or roasted) or to a dish made of minced meat. Variation of the latter known traditionally as sichenyk (Ukrainian: січеник) is made of minced meat or fish and vegetables and covered with bread crumbs.

Chicken Kiev is called kotleta po-kyivsky (котлета по-київськи) in Ukrainian and has a speech named after it.

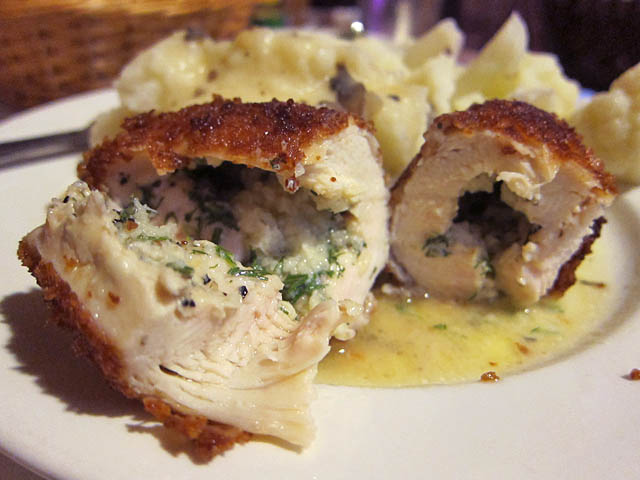
Kotleta po-kyivsky (chicken Kiev)

== Sri Lankan cuisine ==
In Sri Lankan cuisine, cutlets almost always refer to fish (usually tuna or mackerel) and potato croquettes. Usually the fish and potatoes are mixed with spices, green chilies and onions and dipped in a batter made of flour and eggs before being crumbed and fried.

== See also ==
- Escalope
