= Breaded cutlet =

Meat in breading or batter

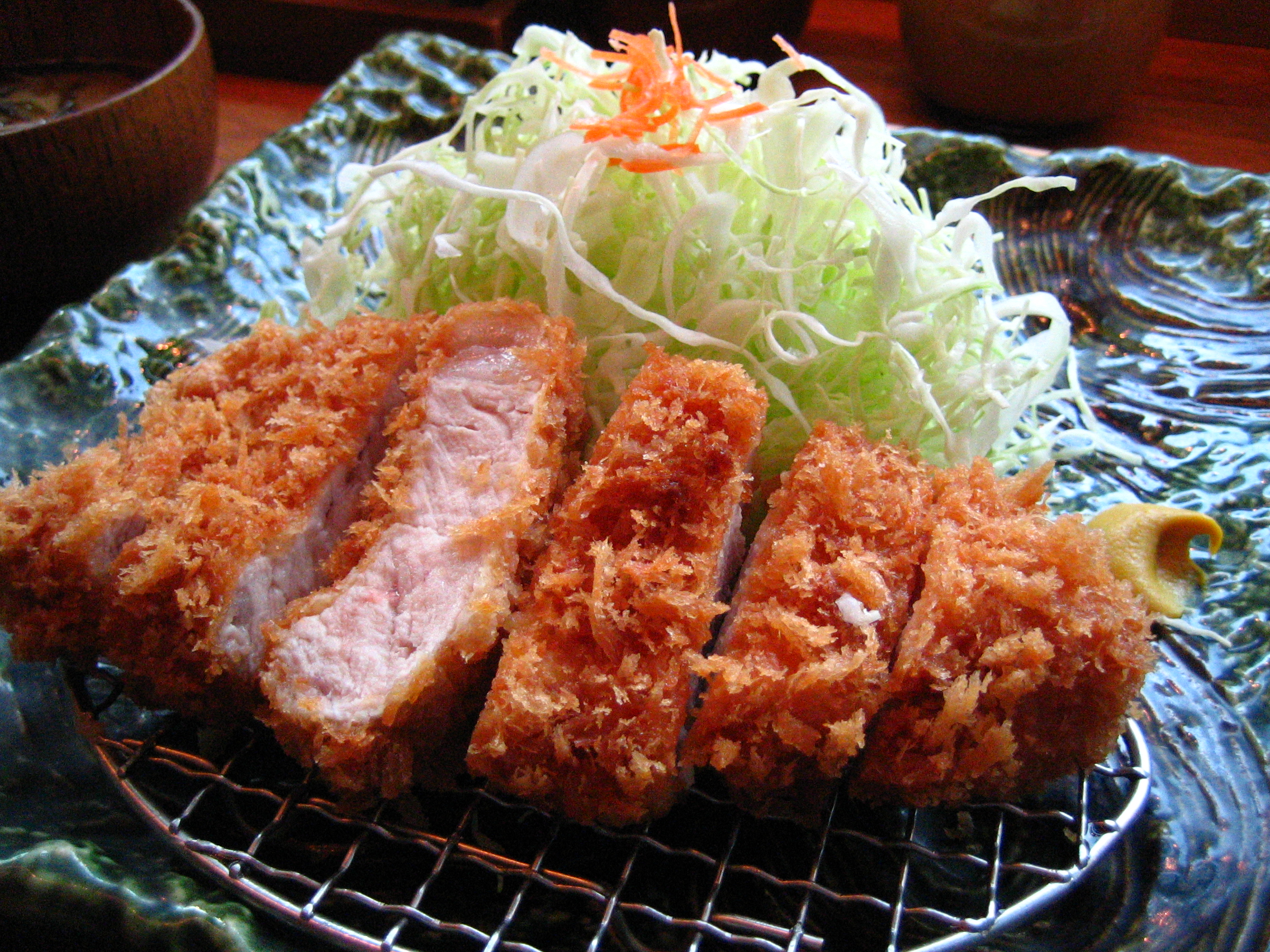
Breaded cutlet dishes are popular around the world. Katsu is the Japanese name for a breaded cutlet and tonkatsu refers to a pork cutlet.

Breaded cutlet or braised cutlet is a dish made from coating a cutlet of meat with breading or batter and either frying or baking it.

Breaded cutlet is known as schnitzel in German-speaking countries, cotoletta in Italy, escalope in France, filete empanado in Spain, filete empanizado in Cuba, milanesa in Latin America, katsu in Japan, kotlet in Poland, řízek in the Czech Republic, rezeň in Slovakia and kotleta in post-Soviet countries.

== Chicken fingers ==
Chicken fingers or chicken tenders are an American dish prepared by breading and deep frying the pectoralis minor muscle of the chicken, which is the smaller cut of the chicken breast located along its underside, attached to the ribs.

== Chicken-fried steak ==
Chicken-fried steak (also known as country-fried steak) is an American breaded cutlet dish that may have originated with German and Austrian immigrants to Texas in the 19th century. It is a piece of beef steak (tenderized cubed steak) coated with seasoned flour and fried. It is associated with Southern U.S. cuisine. Its name is likely related to the dish being prepared similarly to fried chicken. It is typically served with mashed potatoes with both the steak and potatoes covered with white, cracked pepper gravy.

== Chicken Kiev ==
Chicken Kiev is a breaded cutlet dish popular in the post-Soviet states, as well as in several other countries of the former Eastern Bloc, and in the English-speaking world. It is made of boneless chicken breast pounded and rolled around cold garlic butter with herbs, then breaded and either fried or baked. It is called kotleta po-kievski (котлета по-киевски) in Russian and similarly kotleta po-kyivski (котлета по-київськи) in Ukrainian, which means "Kyiv-style cutlet".

== Cordon bleu ==
The designation cordon bleu (French for "blue ribbon") describes a cutlet of veal, chicken or pork that has been stuffed with ham and cheese (or occasionally other combinations of ingredients), then breaded and either fried or baked.

== Côtelette Menon ==
Breaded veal cutlets have been a staple of French cuisine since at least the 18th century. One of the most famous recipes for this dish is found in a book written by the chef Joseph Menon in 1749, called côtelette de veau frite. This dish was also known as côtelette révolution as it gained popularity around the time of the French Revolution.

== Cotoletta ==
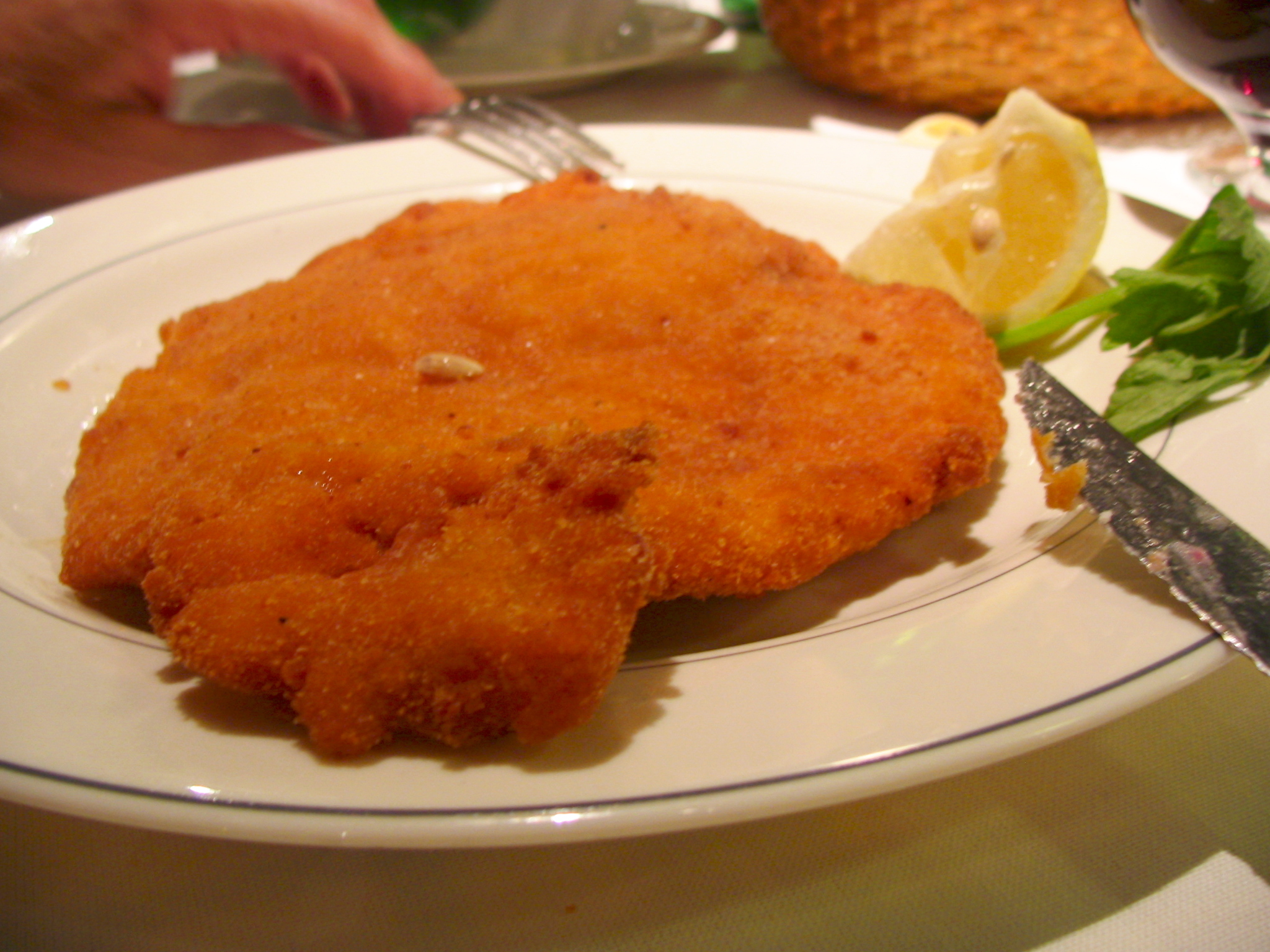
Cotoletta alla milanese

Cotoletta originates in Italy as cotoletta alla milanese and is very similar to Wiener schnitzel. However, it is a cutlet rather than an escalope, and it is traditionally cooked with its rib. Originally from Milan, it can now be found all over the country.

In Spain, breaded cutlet is normally called escalope milanesa in restaurants when served with French fries and a slice of lemon. When eaten in a sandwich, it is simply called filete empanado. It is usually made of veal or beef. Chicken is called pollo empanado, and pork is not usual.

Cotoletta was first documented in 1148 (Saint Ambrose's archive, Milan) in Latin, as Lumbolos cum panicio.

== Kotlet schabowy ==
Polish kotlet schabowy is similar to the traditional Austrian dish, but made with pork tenderloin. It is usually served with potatoes and a salad of either raw vegetables (surówka) or, most commonly, of pickled cabbage, the latter akin to coleslaw. Other versions are the kotlet z kurczaka, a variety of chicken cutlet coated in breadcrumbs, and the kotlet z indyka, a turkey cutlet coated in breadcrumbs.

== Kotleta ==
In modern Russian and Ukrainian, the word kotleta (котлета; pl. kotlety) refers almost exclusively to pan-fried minced meat croquettes or cutlet-shaped patties. Bread soaked in milk, onions, garlic, and herbs is usually present in the recipe. In some recipes, the patties are covered with bread crumbs. In Ukrainian cuisine, a breaded variety called sichenyk (січеник) is made of minced meat or fish and vegetables.

A particular form of the Russian kotleta known as Pozharsky cutlet is an elaborated version of minced poultry kotleta covered with breadcrumbs. A distinct feature of this cutlet is that butter is added to minced meat, which results in an especially juicy and tender consistency.

All these dishes are usually served with pan-fried potatoes, mashed potatoes, pasta etc.

=== Otbivnaya ===
Another Russian version of a cutlet, called otbivnaya kotleta (отбивная котлета), meaning "beaten cutlet", is a fried slice of meat, usually pork or beef, beaten flat with a tenderizing hammer or knife handle and covered with beaten eggs, dough or breadcrumbs. The recipe is similar to those of escalopes, schnitzel, Polish, or American cutlets. Today, this dish is simply called otbivnaya, with the word kotleta reserved for minced meat patties.

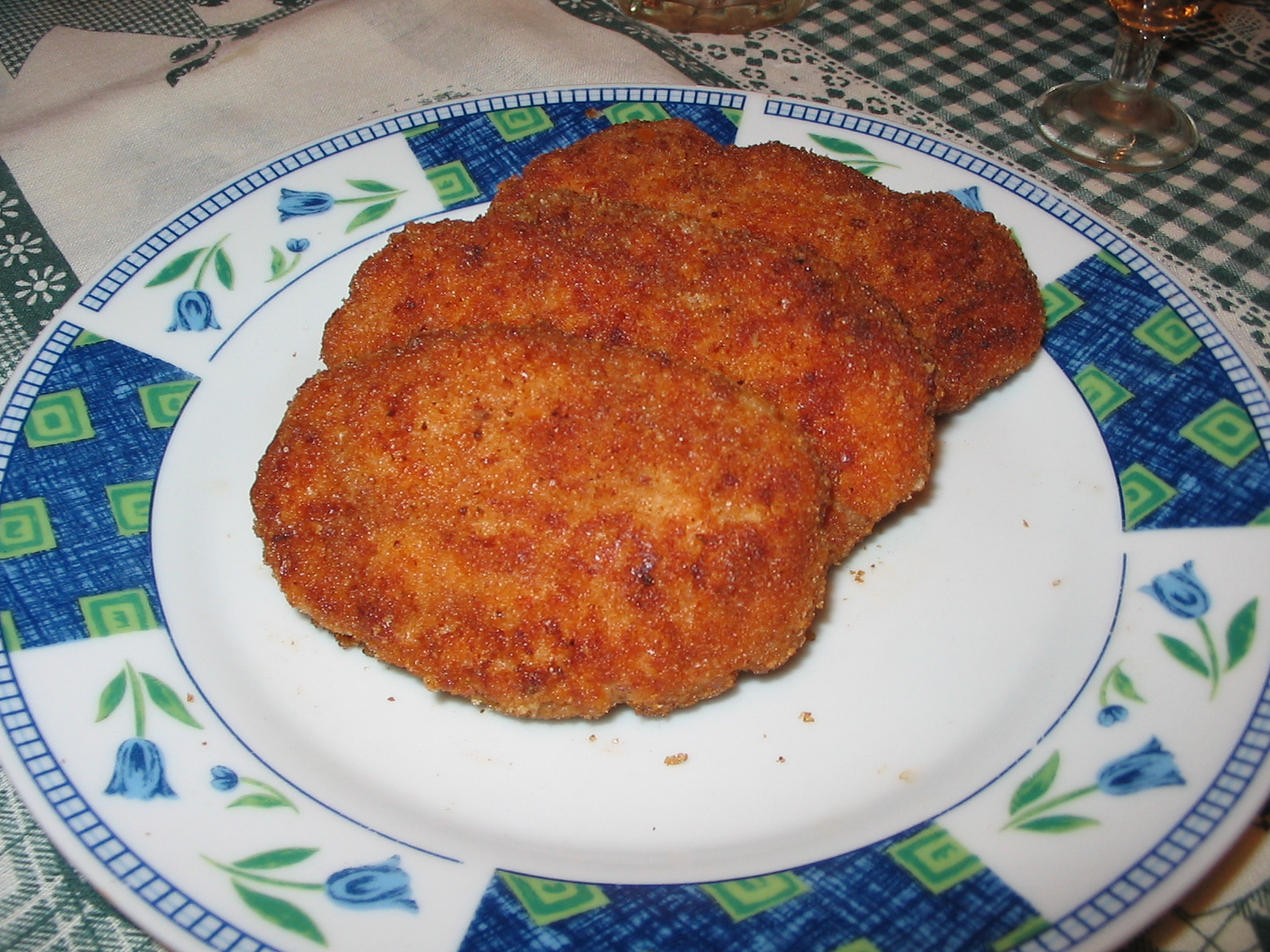
Breaded minced kotlety or sichenyky

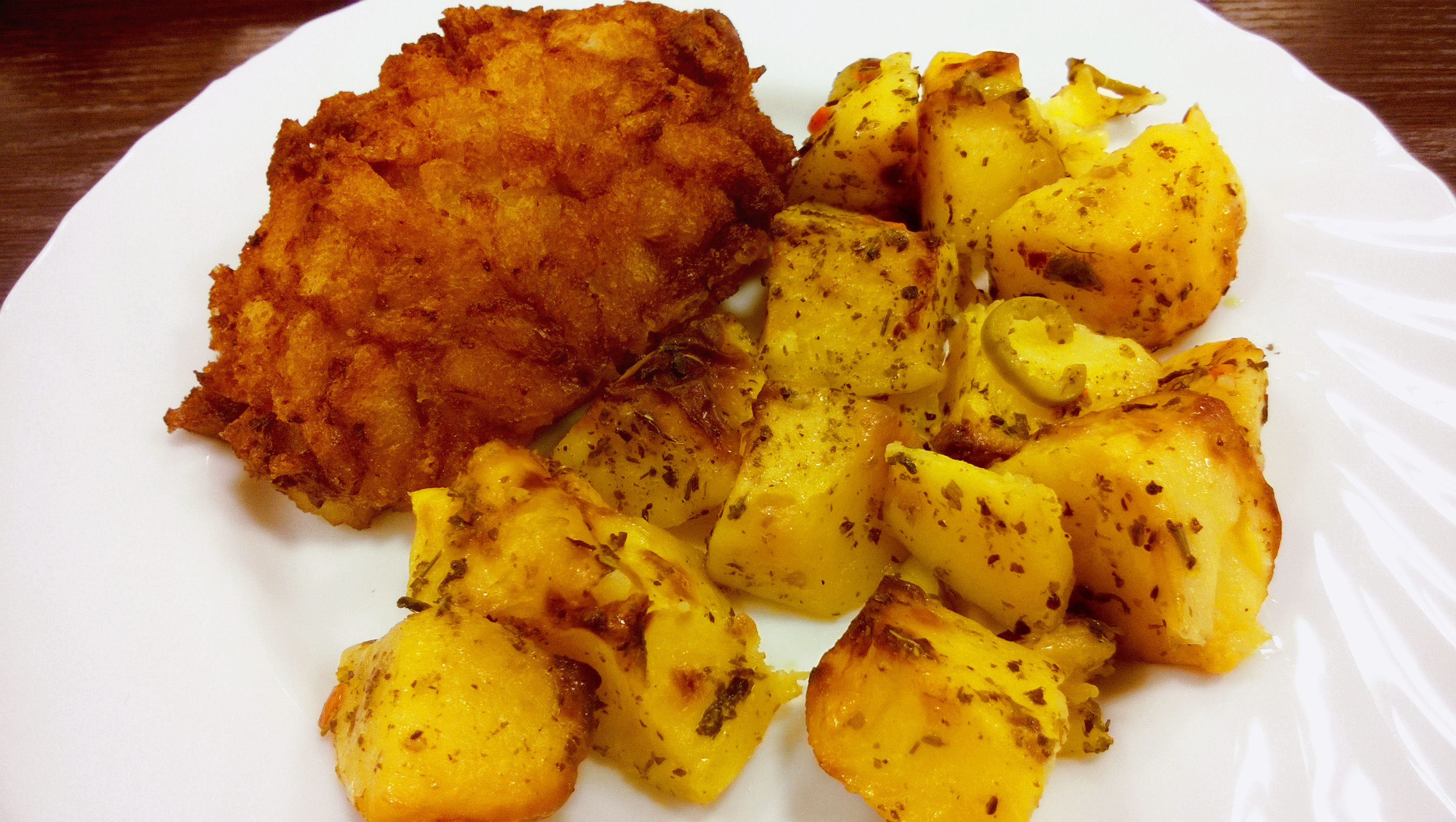
Pozharsky cutlet served with sautéed potatoes

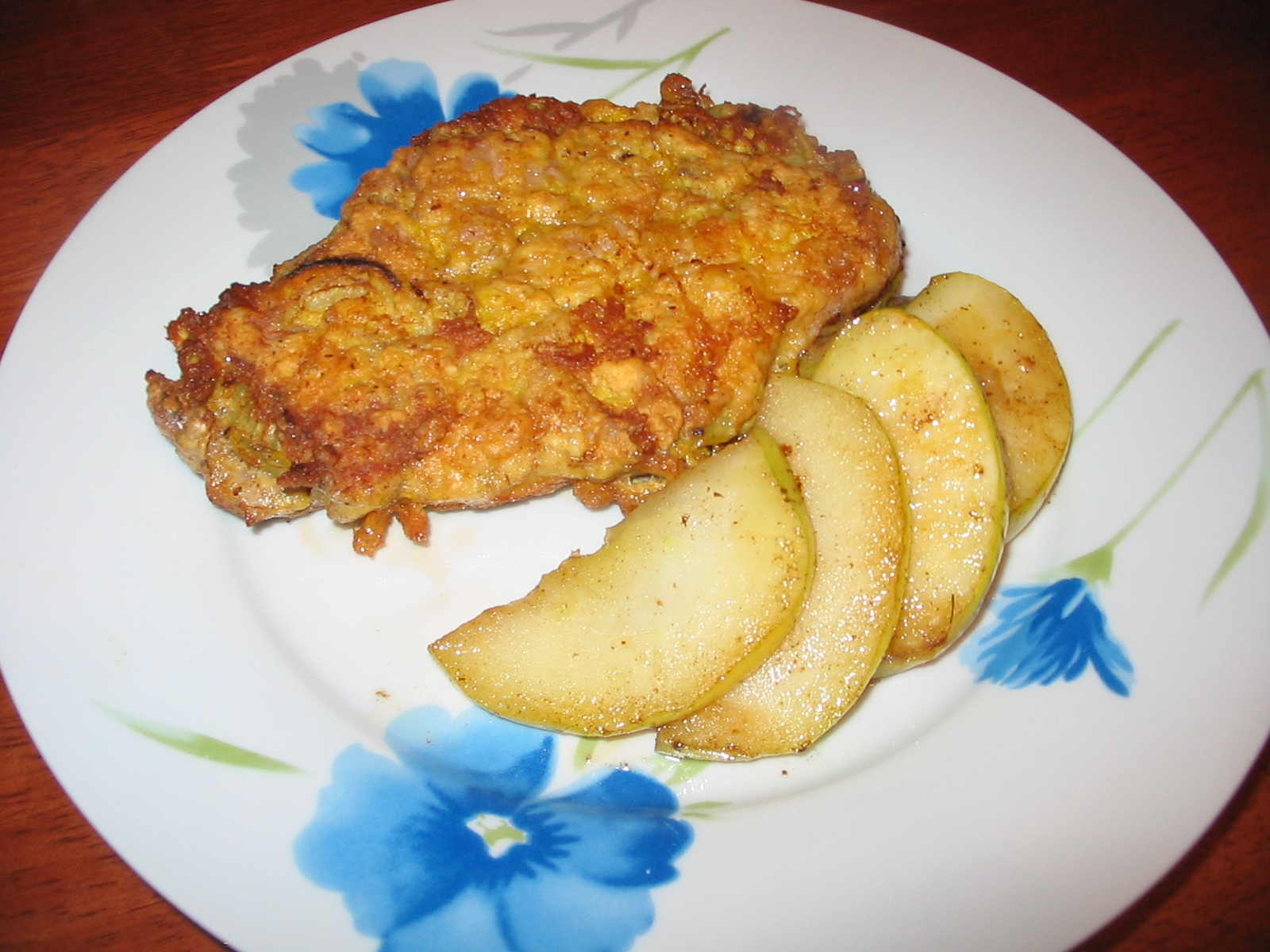
Otbivnaya kotleta

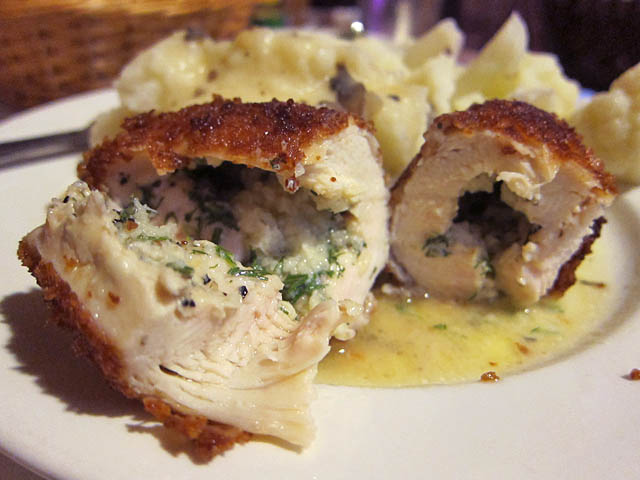
Kotleta po-kievski (chicken Kiev)

== Milanesa ==
=== South America ===
In Argentina and Uruguay the milanesa, a dish similar to the schnitzel, is a typical dish. Its name means 'from Milan'. The milanesa is made of beef or veal, dipped in egg, and then breadcrumbs, and fried, while a milanesa napolitana is topped with ham, melted mozzarella cheese and tomato slices or tomato sauce.

Due to the strong influence of Italian culture in Brazil, breaded cutlets are known as filé à milanesa (Milanese steak) or bife à milanesa. It is found easily in street restaurants and often cooked at home. Servings often include white rice, salted brown or black beans, mashed potatoes or French fries, lettuce and tomato salad. Milanesa sandwiches are somewhat less common, and there is also the parmigiana version—filé à milanesa with tomato sauce, ham, and melted mozzarella cheese.

In Colombia, the dish is called milanesa or chuleta valluna, and is made with a thin cut of pork, breaded and fried.

In Chile, breaded cutlet is known as escalopa, and it is usually made of beef, pork or chicken. This dish is also known as a milanesa, and it is prepared by breading and frying thin pieces of meat. Escalopas can be found from fancy to simple restaurants.

=== Mexico, Central America, and Spanish Caribbean ===
In Cuba, breaded cutlet is served as steak milanesa, made with a thin cut of sirloin, breaded and fried, with tomato sauce on top and sometimes melted cheese. It is usually served with traditional Cuban side dishes.

If not accompanied by the tomato sauce, it is merely known as bistec empanizado, bistec empanado or empanada. It is sometimes eaten with slices of lime or key lime on the side to squirt on top.

In Mexico, thinly sliced meat, breaded and fried, known as milanesa, is a popular ingredient in tortas, the sandwiches sold in street stands and indoor restaurants in Mexico City. It is usually a beef (also pork or chicken) cut tenderized thin, and coated with flour, whisked eggs, and breadcrumbs. It can be part of a main dinner course, or used as a breaded and fried filet in torta style sandwiches.

In Panama, cutlet is known as milanesa, and is most commonly made of thinly sliced beef (usually sirloin steaks) but also thin chicken fillets. The meat is seasoned with salt and pepper, dipped in beaten eggs and covered with flour or bread crumbs and fried in vegetable oil. If breaded, they are normally covered with flour first before being dipped in the egg. Lime juice is then squeezed over the cutlets before serving or eating them, and they are also seasoned with hot sauce often. Milanesas are eaten with white rice and other common side dishes, such as salad, lentils or beans. The latter two are poured over the rice as they are usually served in Panama while the salad is served off to the side where there is still space left on the plate. When served as sandwiches, they are known as emparedado de milanesa or sandwich de milanesa when tomatoes, onions, lettuce, ketchup or American cheese (known as queso amarillo i.e. yellow cheese). Sandwich bread and pan flauta (a Panamanian type of baguette that is thicker and softer) are the types used to make these sandwiches.

== Panado ==
In Portugal, breaded cutlet is called bife panado or just panado (which means "breaded" in Portuguese). Different varieties of panado can be made with chicken (panado de frango), turkey (panado de peru), pork (costeleta panada for pork chop, febra panada for pork without bone), or veal (escalope de vitela panado). The meat is usually seasoned with black pepper, garlic, and lemon juice. It is commonly served with spaghetti, fried potatoes, or rice (plain or with beans). It is also popular as a sandwich, served in a bun with lettuce (sandes de panado).

== Parmesan ==
In North America, chicken parmigiana is an Italian-American dish, consisting of a breaded chicken breast topped with tomato sauce and mozzarella, parmesan or provolone cheese. It is commonly offered as a sit-down entree, with a side of Italian-style pasta. It is also offered as a submarine sandwich.

In Australia, chicken parmigiana is a popular pub food, typically served with chips and salad.

== Parmo ==
In Teesside in the north-east of England, breaded chicken or pork is served with béchamel sauce and a grilled cheese topping. This is known as Parmesan or "parmo". It can be served as the main course of a meal, but is also popular as a takeaway snack, served like pizza and sometimes topped with vegetables or additional meat.

== Scaloppine ==
Scaloppine, an Italian dish, consists of breaded cutlets of meat, commonly veal or chicken, pan-fried and served with a pan sauce.

== Řízek ==
Řízek is one of the Czech Republic's many breaded dishes. It consists of pork, chicken, or veal that is pounded with a meat tenderizer until thin, coated with flour, egg wash, and bread crumbs before being fried in hot oil. It can also be served without the breading, known as přírodní řízek (a natural cutlet). In some cases, řízek can be stuffed with eggs, ham, peppers, peas, or Edam cheese, which is presented in dishes such as Brněnský řízek and Holandský řízek. Řízek is commonly served with potato salad, boiled potatoes, French fries, bread dumplings, or rice.

== Schnitzel ==
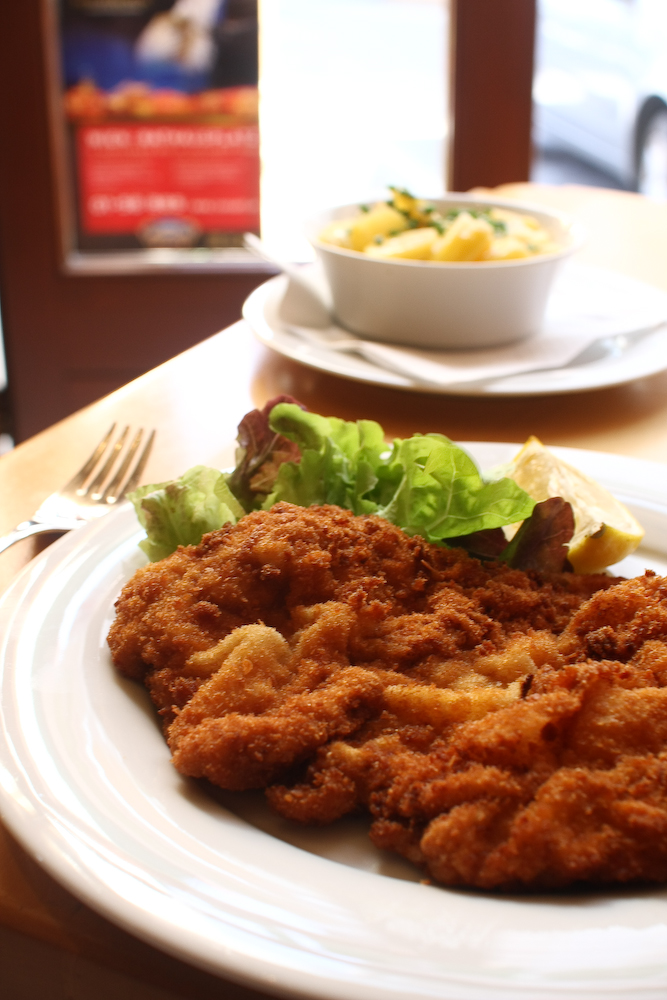
Wiener schnitzel

Schnitzel (German pronunciation: [ˈʃnɪtsl̩]) is a breaded cutlet dish made with boneless meat thinned with a hammer (escalope-style preparation), coated in bread crumbs and fried. In Austria, the dish called Wiener Schnitzel (Viennese schnitzel) is from veal and is traditionally garnished with a slice of lemon and either potato salad or potatoes with parsley and butter.

In Austria and Germany, the term Wiener Schnitzel is protected by law and the schnitzel must be made from veal. There are also regional versions of schnitzel, such as Salzburger schnitzel, which is stuffed with mushrooms, bacon, onions, and various other herbs.

== Tonkatsu ==
In Japan, tonkatsu is a deep-fried pork cutlet breaded with panko. Katsu of other meats cooked in a similar manner include chicken katsu, gyū katsu or bifukatsu (beef) and menchi-katsu (ground meat patty). Katsukarē is a Japanese curry dish topped with tonkatsu.

In Hawaii, chicken katsu is a part of local cuisine.

In Korea, pork cutlet is called donkasu, derived from the Japanese tonkatsu. The most common types of donkasu are kyeongyangsik (Western-style) and ilbonsik (Japanese-style).

In China and Taiwan, pork cutlets are called zhu-pai, and are a common restaurant dish originating from Japanese influence. Zhu-pai are usually accompanied with rice and vegetables such as broccoli or bell peppers.

Another type of cutlet found in Taiwan, ji-pai, is made of chicken and is commonly found in night markets.

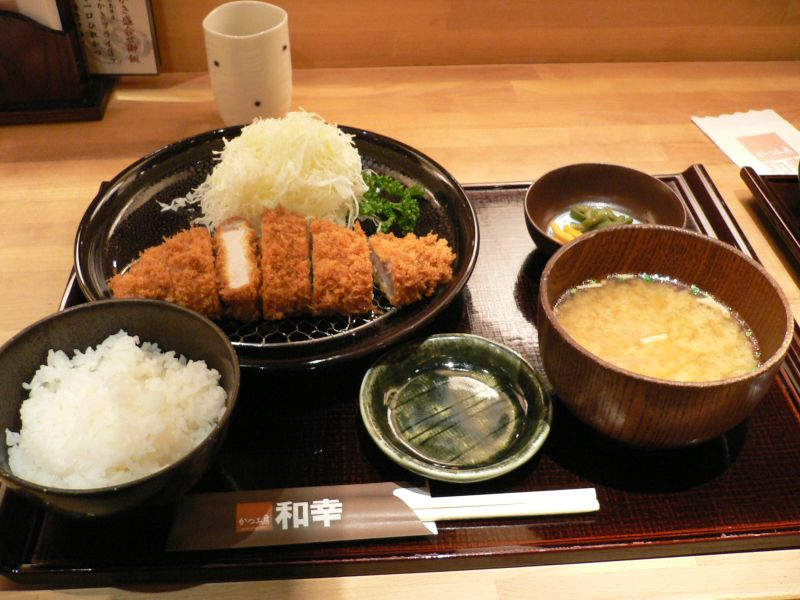
Tonkatsu served with shredded cabbage, boiled rice and miso soup in Sapporo, Hokkaido, Japan

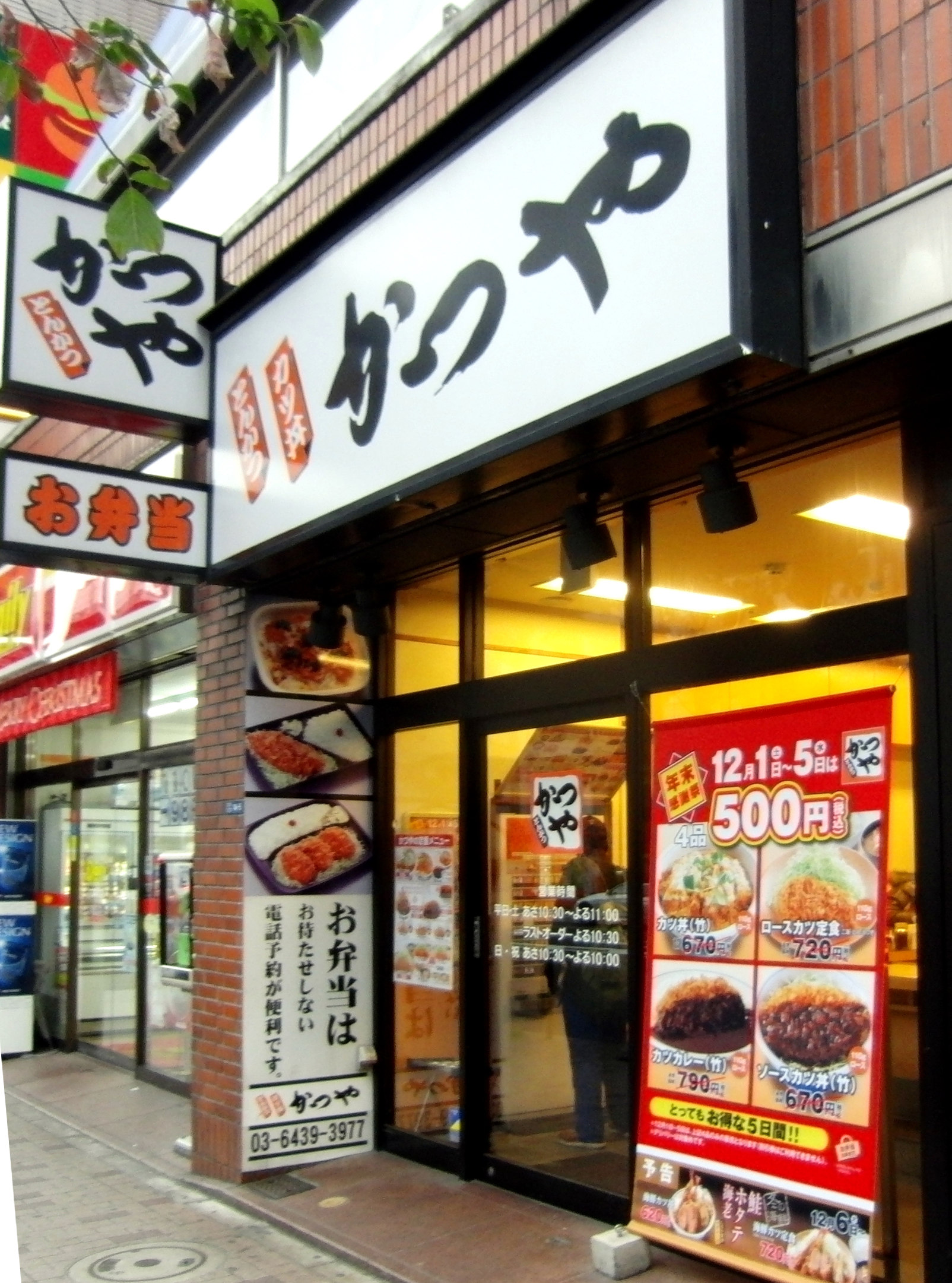
A tonkatsu restaurant in Tokyo, Japan

== See also ==
- Collops
- List of deep-fried foods
- List of meat dishes
