= Scaloppine =

Type of Italian meat dish

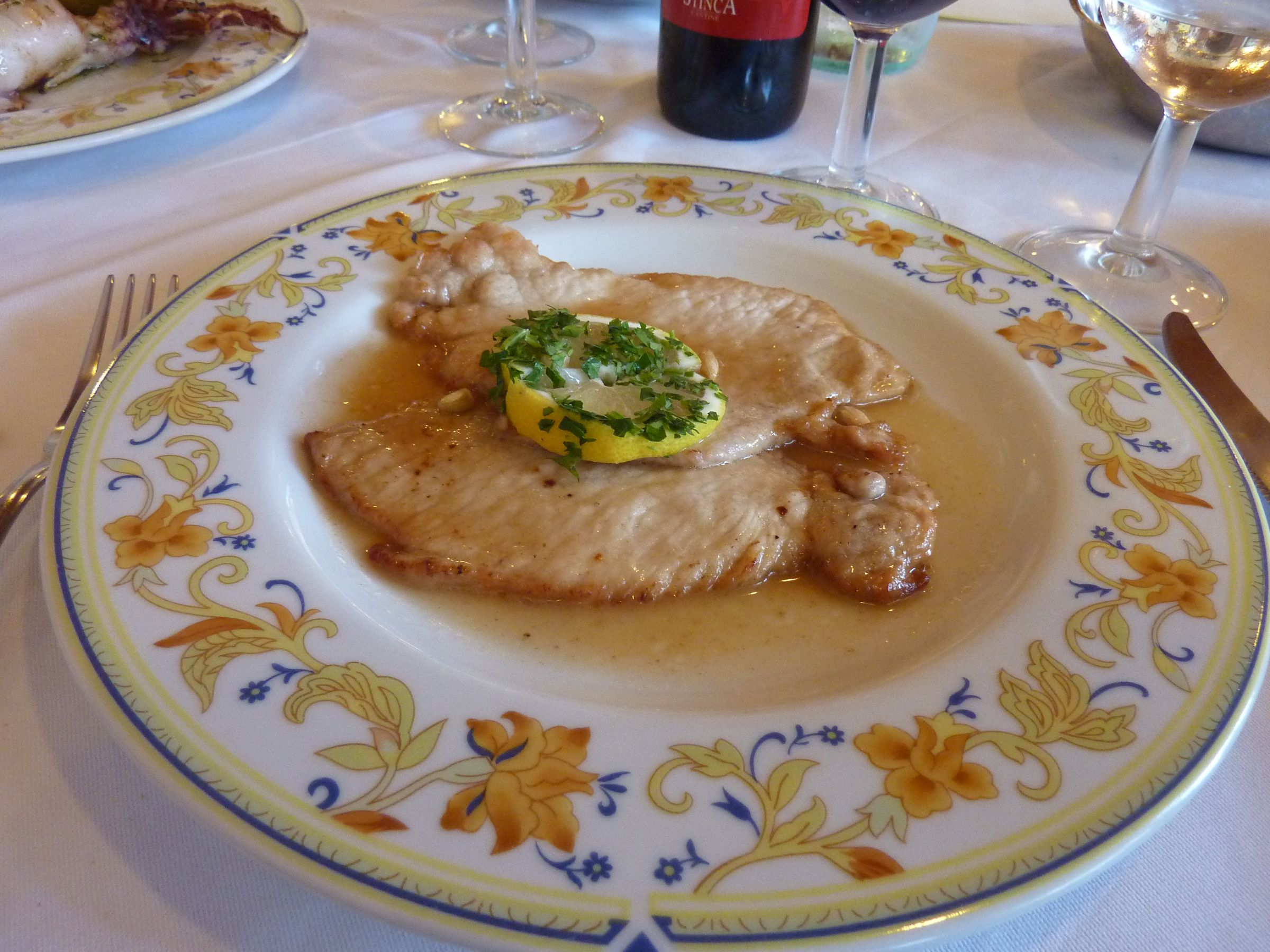
- Scaloppine al limone
- Course: Secondo (Italian course)
- Place of origin: Italy
- Main ingredients: Meat (either beef, veal, or chicken), wheat flour, redux sauce

Scaloppine (plural and diminutive of scaloppa—a small escalope, i.e., a thinly sliced cut of meat) is a type of Italian dish that consists of thinly sliced meat, most often beef, veal, or chicken, that is dredged in wheat flour and sautéed in a reduction sauce, which varies by region.

Popular sauces include tomato-wine reduction; scaloppine al limone or piccata, which denotes a caper-and-lemon sauce; scaloppine ai funghi, a mushroom-wine reduction; and pizzaiola, a pizza-style tomato sauce. Veal scaloppine served with tomato sauce, prosciutto, and mozzarella has been popular in Italian-American cuisine since World War II, where a heavier version is made than in Campania. It is speculated that the dish was created in a luxury resort hotel in Sorrento, which had better access to tender veal than home cooks.

The term scaloppa derives from the French escalope. The untranslated term was used until the beginning of the twentieth century in the publications of various Italian gastronomes such as Giovanni Vialardi and Ada Boni.

== See also ==
Media related to Scaloppine at Wikimedia Commons

- List of veal dishes
