= Piccata =

Italian dish

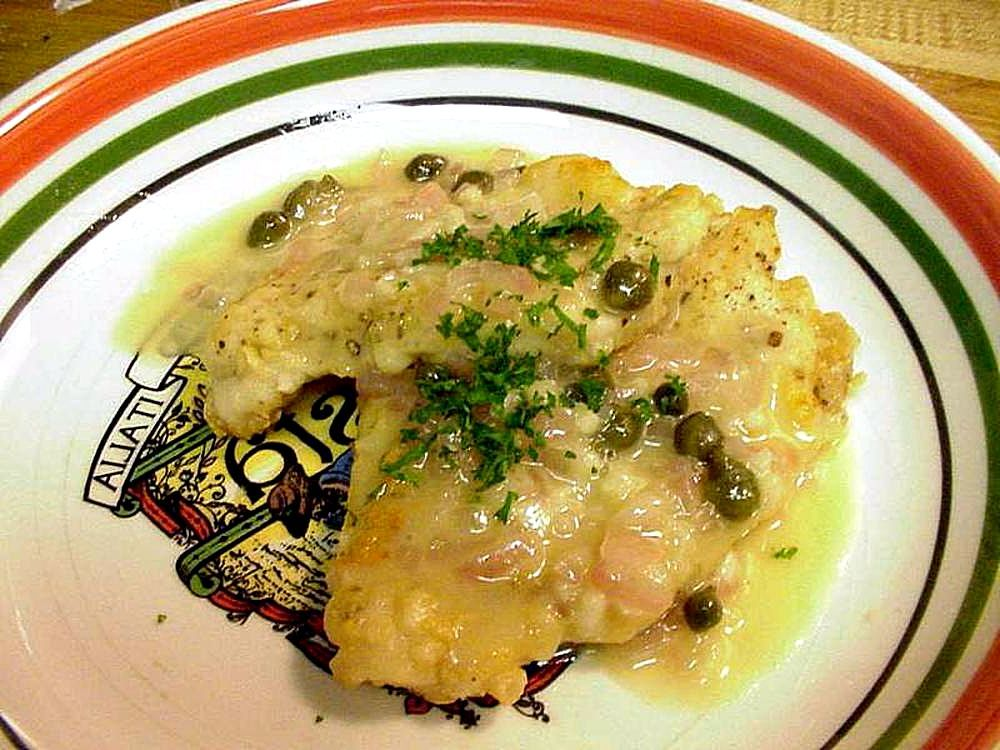
Chicken piccata

Piccata is an Italian dish of thin pan-fried flour-dredged meat in a sauce of lemon juice, butter, parsley, and often capers. In Italian cuisine, piccata is prepared with veal (piccata di vitello al limone, lit. 'veal piccata with lemon'), whereas in American cuisine, chicken is more common. A similar dish, pesce spada con capperi e limone, is made with swordfish.

== Etymology ==
Piccata, the past passive participle of piccare, literally means 'larded', 'seasoned', or 'pounded flat'.

== Preparation ==
The meat is cut thin and flattened to an even thickness with a tenderizer. It is seasoned and dredged in flour before being browned in butter or olive oil.

The sauce is made using pan drippings; lemon juice and white wine or chicken stock are added and reduced. Chopped parsley and often capers are added, and sometimes also shallots or garlic. After reduction, butter is stirred in to finish the sauce. It is often garnished with slices of lemon.

In the United States, it is usually served with a vegetable or starch, such as pasta, polenta, or rice. In Italy, it is a secondo (lit. 'second') served after the primo course, usually pasta.

In Japan, piccata is understood as meat coated in an egg mixture and pan-fried largely due to the influence of Swiss chef Saly Weil who the first head chef of Hotel New Grand .

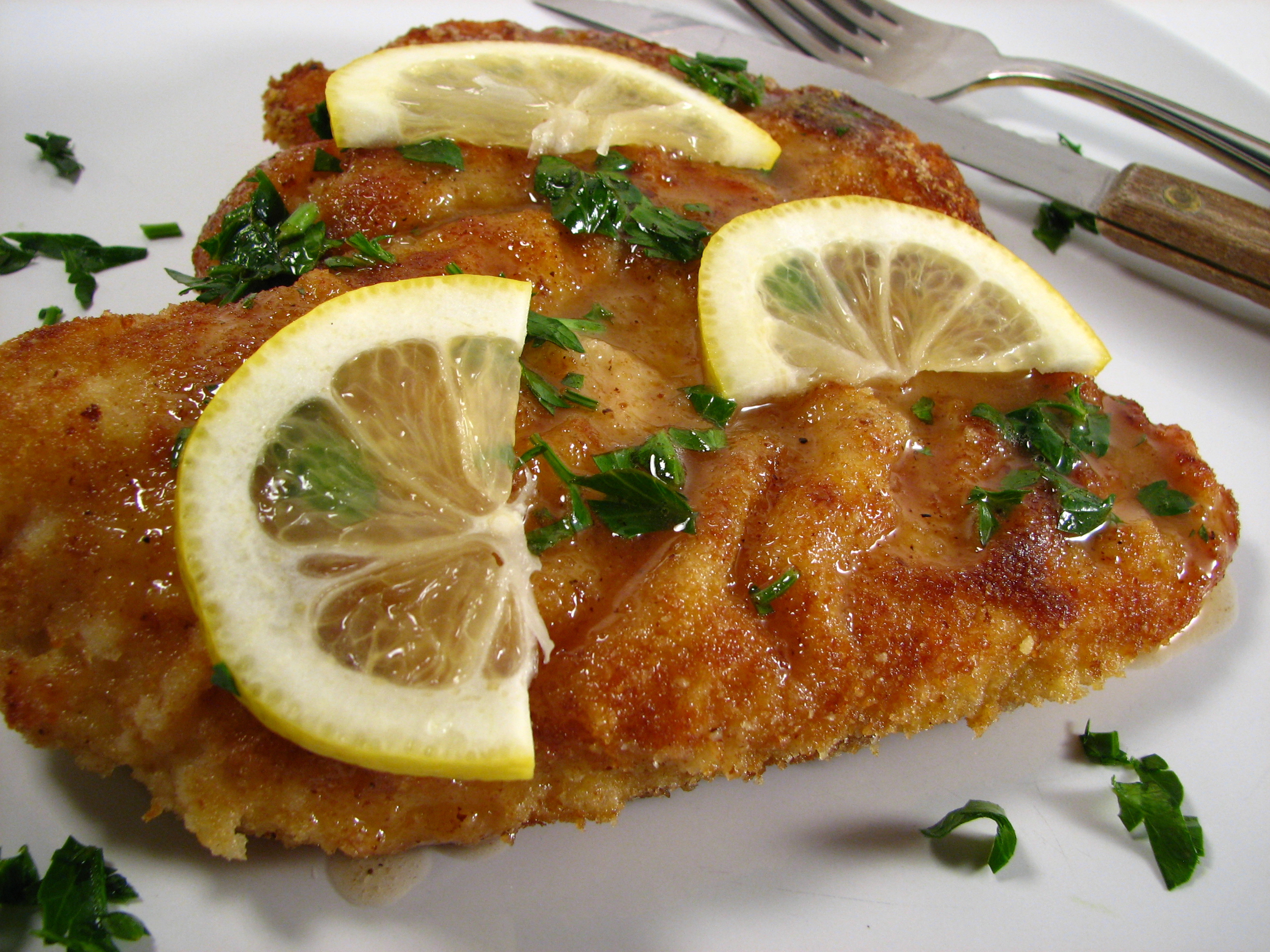
Chicken piccata

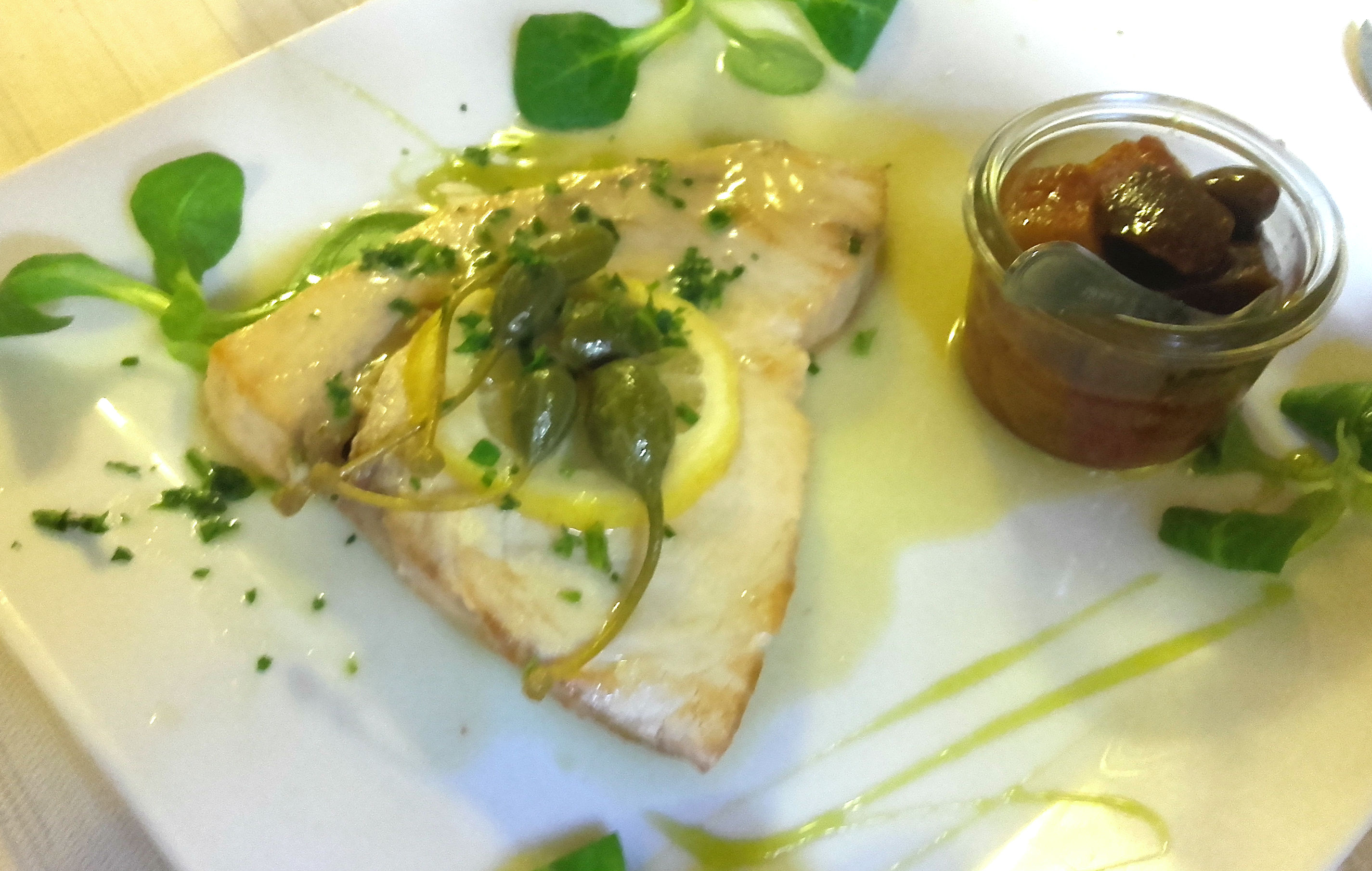
Swordfish in piccata sauce

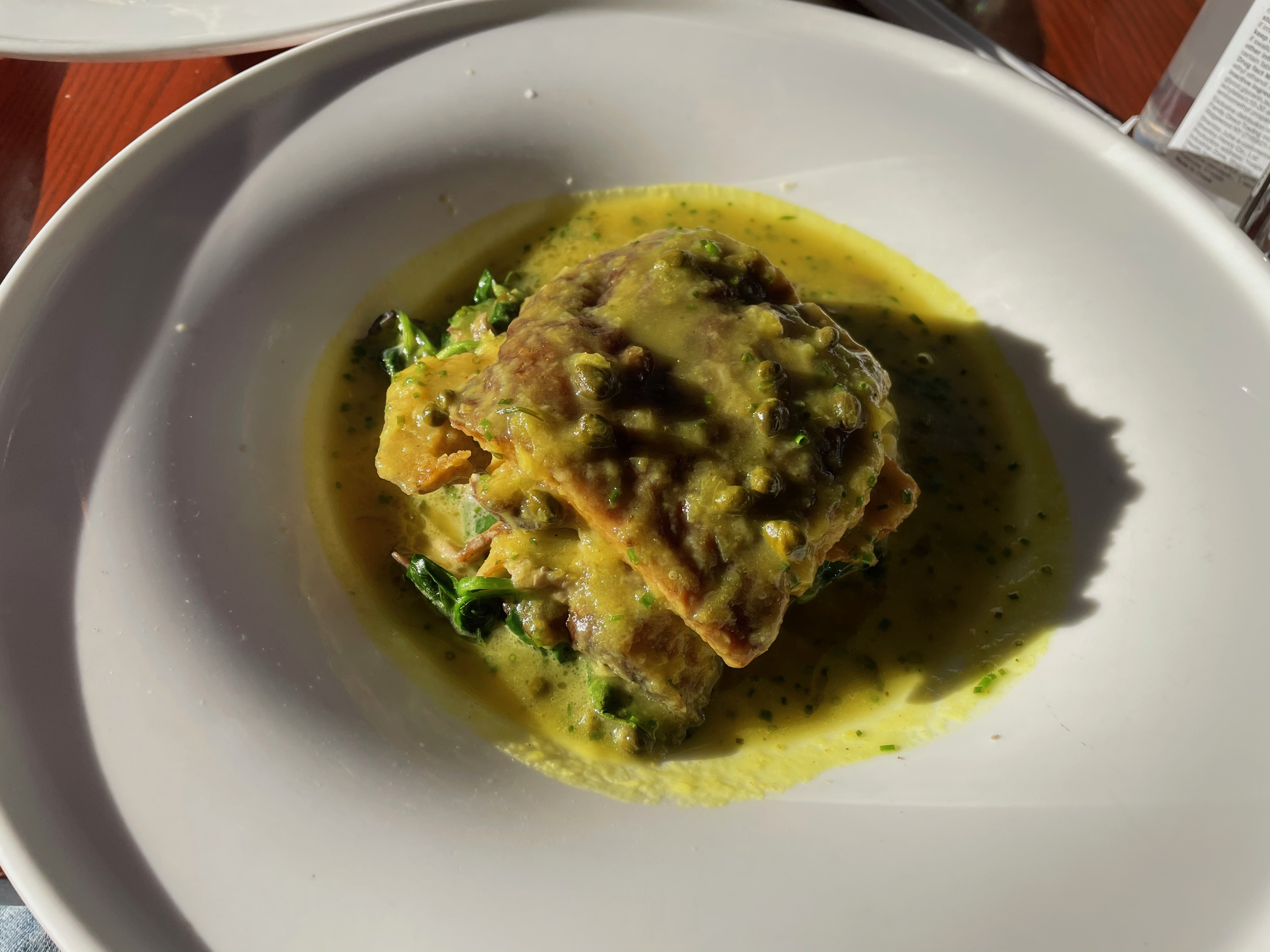
Seitan piccata

== See also ==
Media related to Piccata at Wikimedia Commons
