= Kotlet schabowy =

Polish variety of breaded pork cutlet

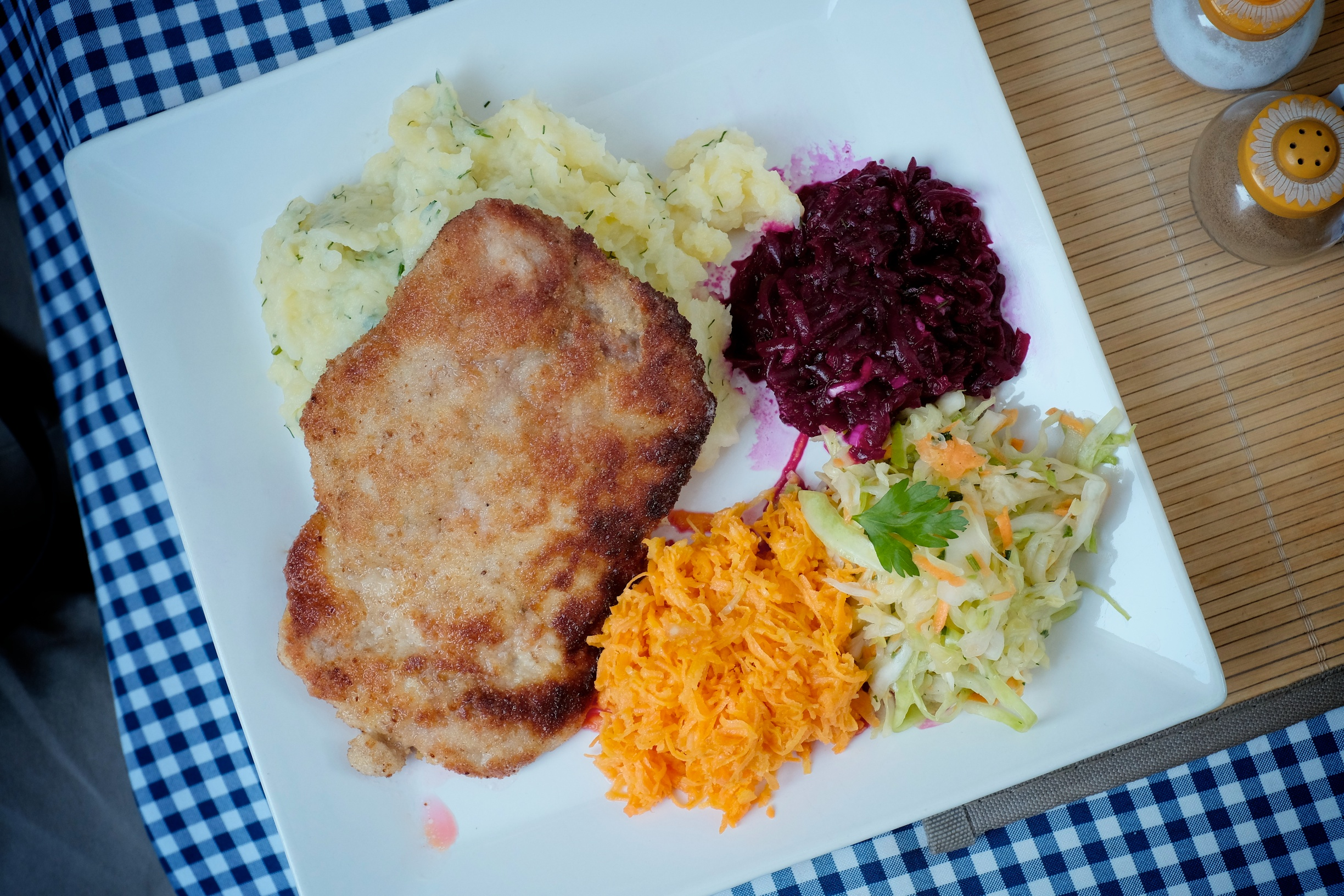
- Kotlet schabowy with mashed potatoes and a side of salads
- Alternative names: Schabowy, Schaboszczak
- Course: Main
- Place of origin: Poland
- Serving temperature: Hot
- Main ingredients: Pork or chicken or turkey, eggs, lard or oil, spices, breadcrumbs, flour

Kotlet schabowy (Polish pronunciation: [ˈkɔtlɛt sxaˈbɔvɨ]) is a Polish variety of a breaded cutlet of pork coated with breadcrumbs. It is similar to Viennese schnitzel or Italian cotoletta, French côtelette de veau frite (or côtelette Menon), North and South American milanesa, Spanish cachopo and Japanese tonkatsu.

The history of schabowy dates back to the 19th century. Different recipes for cutlets such as schabowy are featured in an 1860 cookbook by Lucyna Ćwierczakiewiczowa, 365 obiadów za pięć złotych (365 Dinners for Five Złoty), but are missing from the 1786 cookbook by Wojciech Wielądko called Kucharz doskonały (The Perfect Chef), suggesting that the dish was not known (or at least not popular) before the 19th century. Typical ingredients include eggs, lard or oil, spices, pork loin with or without the bone, breadcrumbs and flour.

== Preparation ==
Pork tenderloin is cut into one-inch slices and pounded with a mallet until it becomes thinner and soft. The meat is dipped in flour, then in egg, and then covered in breadcrumbs. Oil or lard is heated in a frying pan until it starts to sizzle and the meat is placed onto it, then turned over a couple of times. Kotlet schabowy can be served with cooked potatoes, mashed potatoes, fried mushrooms, cooked vegetables (seared cabbage), salads or coleslaw.
