= Escalope =

Thin, flat piece of meat

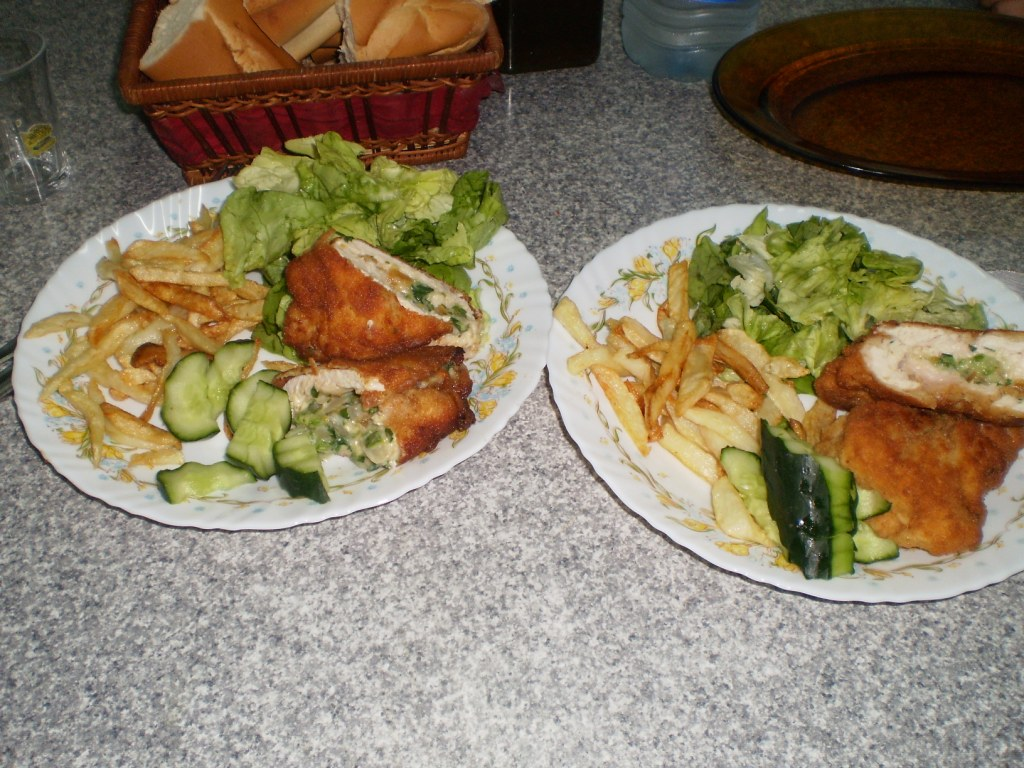
- Escalopes farcies
- Alternative names: Scallop
- Type: Meat
- Place of origin: France
- Associated cuisine: French cuisine

An escalope (UK: /ˈɛskəlɒp/ ESK-əl-op, US: /ɪˈskɑːləp, ˈɛskəloʊp/ isk-AH-ləp, ESK-əl-ohp, French: [ɛskalɔp]), also scallop in the US (not to be confused with the shellfish), is traditionally a piece of boneless meat that has been thinned out using a mallet or rolling pin or beaten with the handle of a knife, or merely butterflied. The mallet breaks down the fibres in the meat, making it more tender. The meat is then coated and fried. The thinner meat cooks faster with more moisture loss.

== Common sizes ==
The typical sizes of an escalope used in the food industry range from 110 to 225 g (4–8 oz).

== Paillard or scallop ==
Paillard is an older French culinary term referring to a quick-cooking, thinly sliced or pounded piece of meat. In France, it has been largely replaced by the word escalope.

== Origin ==
The term escalope originated in France. It first appeared in cookery terminology late in the 17th century as a dialectal expression in the northeast of rural France, originally meaning a shelled nut or mollusk: veau à l'escalope (veal cooked in the style of an escalope). In those days, an escalope was undoubtedly always veal.

== Other uses ==
The term "escalope" is also applied to meat-free products such as Quorn (mycoprotein) escalopes, which have a cheese and broccoli sauce encased in bread crumbs. In Australia the term escalope is also applied to potatoes that have been thinly sliced. Potatoes that are thinly sliced, battered, then fried are often called "scallops".

== See also ==
- Chicken Kiev
- Cotoletta
- Cutlet
  - Chicken katsu
  - Tonkatsu
- Milanesa
- Scaloppine
- Schnitzel
- Wiener schnitzel
