= List of beef dishes =

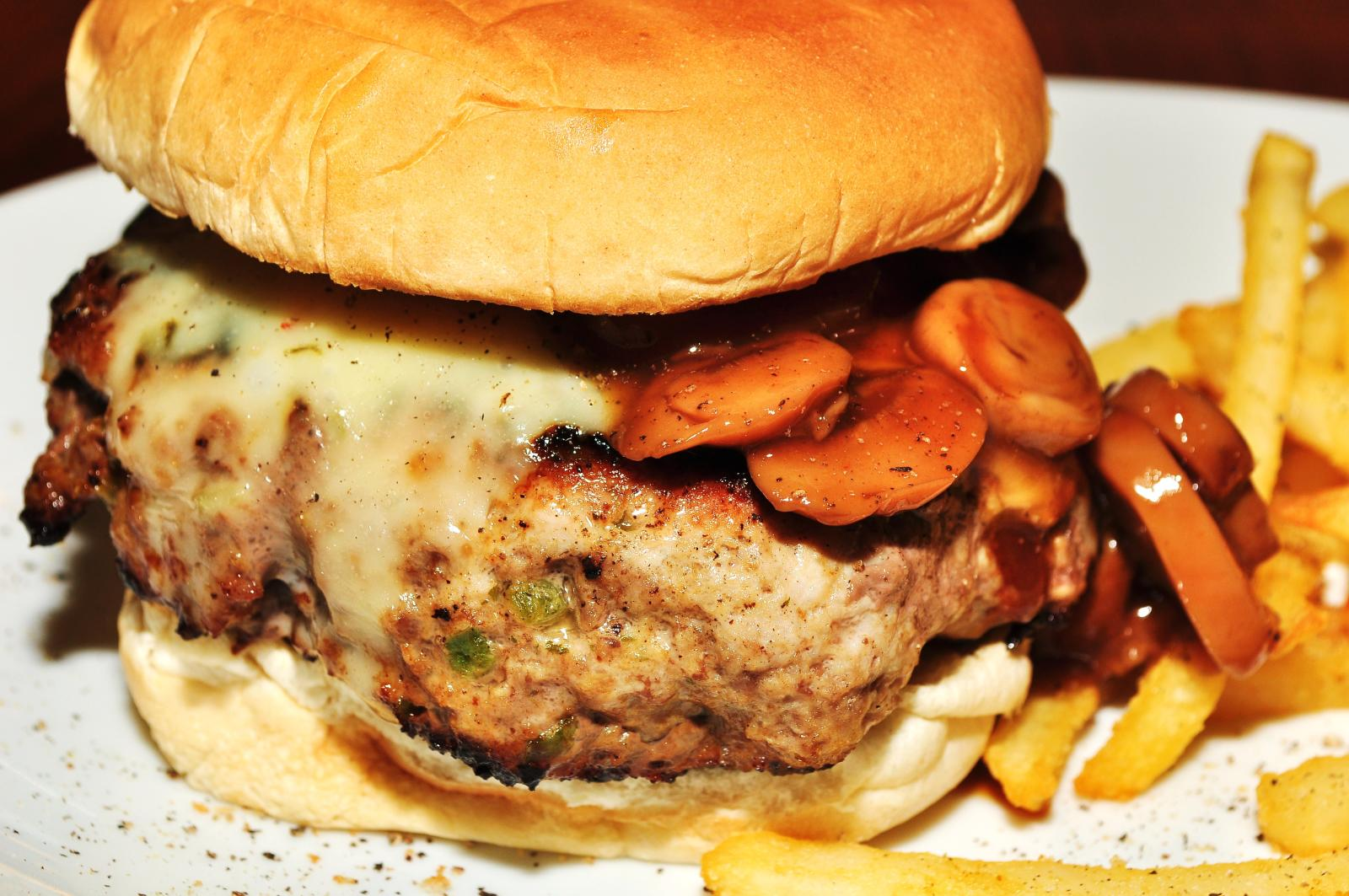
A cheeseburger with mushroom sauce and fries

This is a list of notable beef dishes and foods, whereby beef is used as a primary ingredient. Beef is the culinary name for meat from bovines, especially cattle. Beef can be harvested from cows, bulls, heifers or steers. Acceptability as a food source varies in different parts of the world.

Beef is the third most widely consumed meat in the world, accounting for about 25% of meat production worldwide, after pork and poultry at 38% and 30% respectively. In absolute numbers, the United States, Brazil, and the People's Republic of China are the world's three largest consumers of beef. On a per capita basis in 2009, Argentines consumed the most beef at 64.6 kg per person; people in the U.S. ate 40.2 kg, while those in the E.U. ate 16.9 kg.

== Beef dishes ==
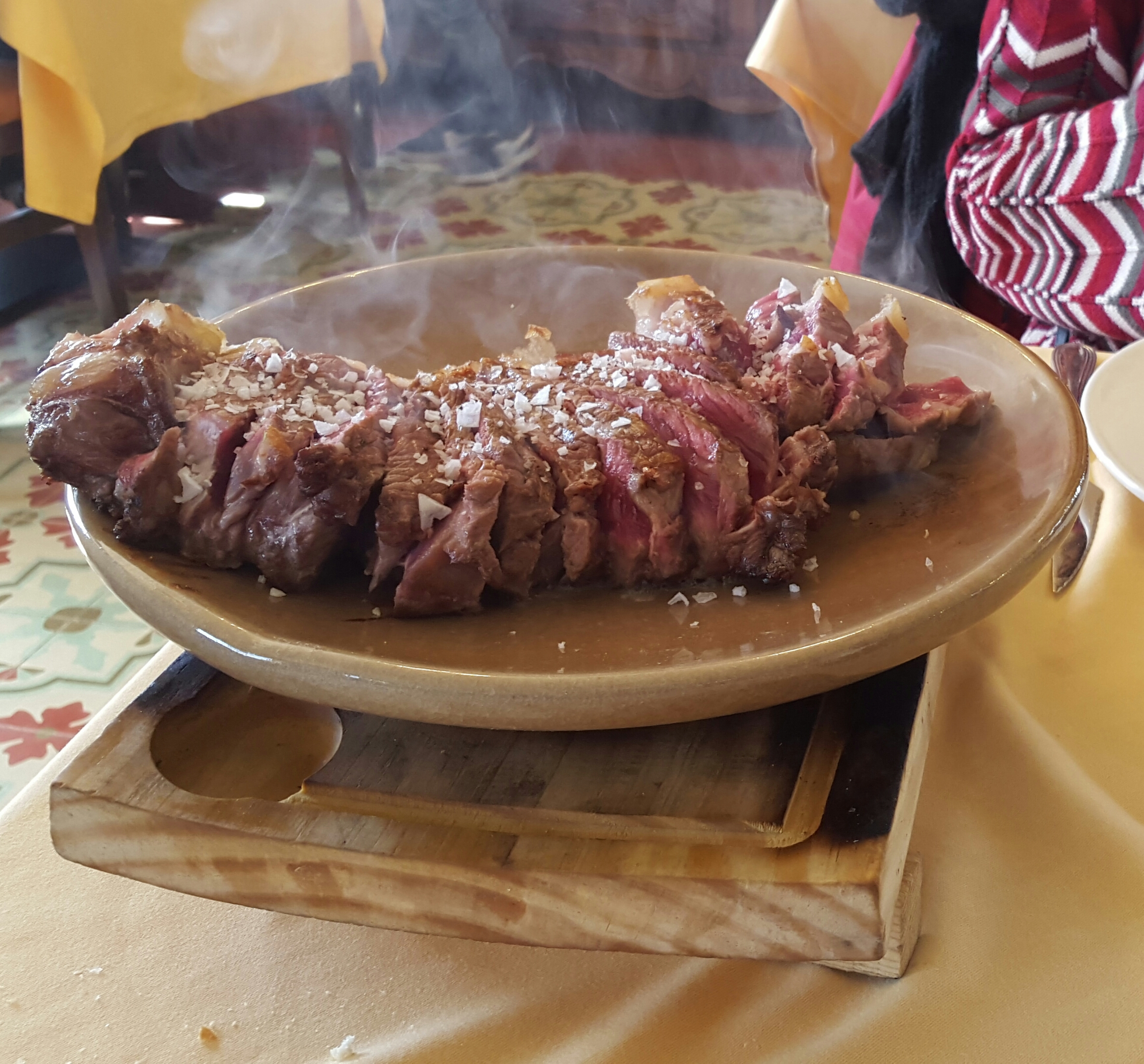
Carne de Ávila

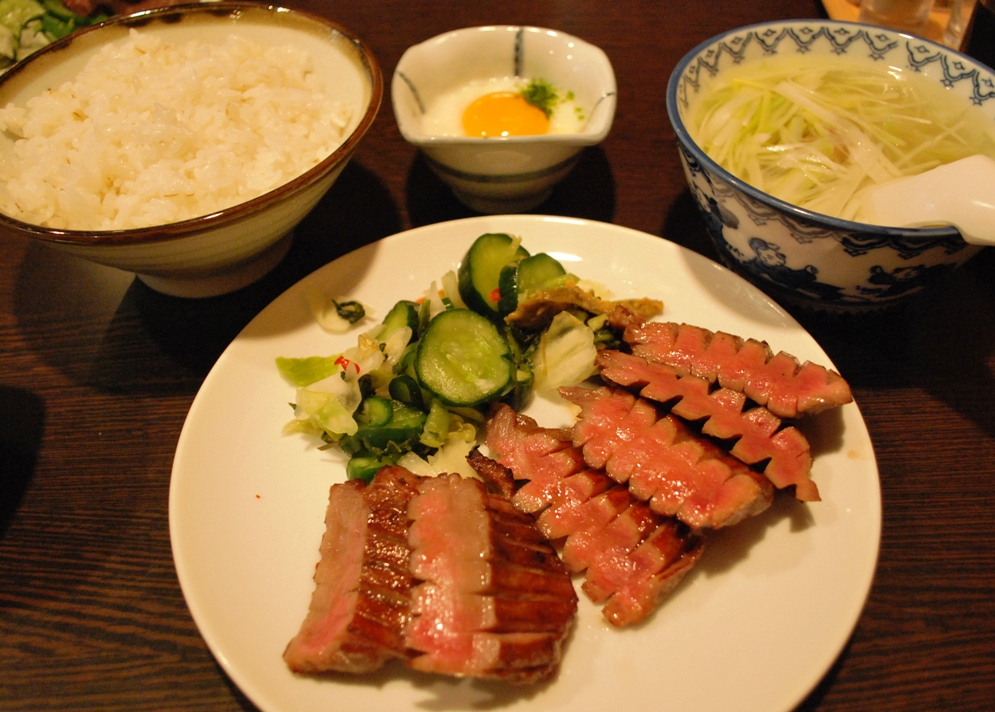
Gyūtan teishoku, a table d'hôte of grilled beef tongue in Sendai. Gyūtan is Japanese for beef tongue, a portmanteau of the Japanese word for beef (gyū) and tan (tongue).

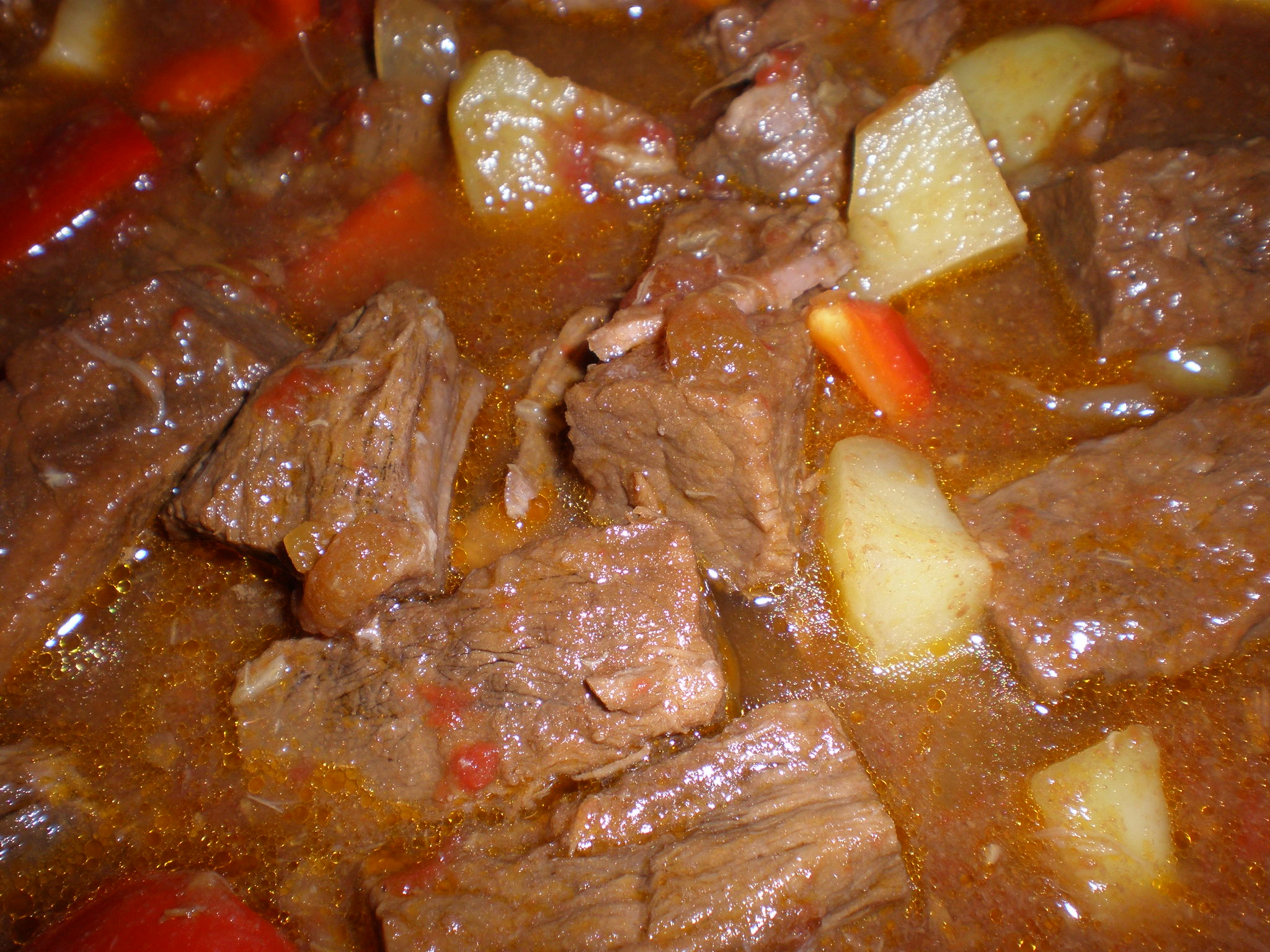
Mechado is a beef dish from the Philippines.

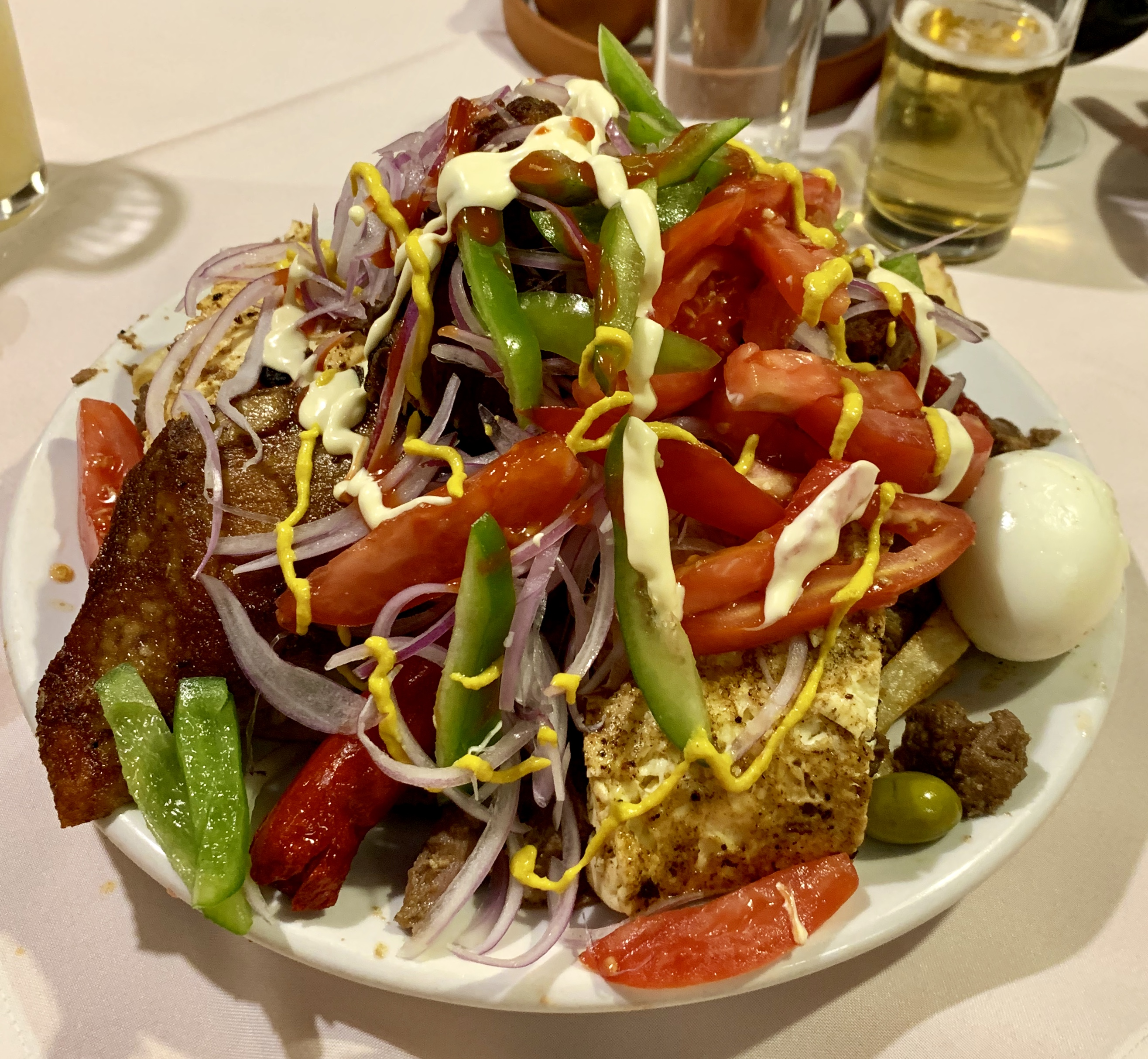
Pique macho, a beef dish from Bolivia

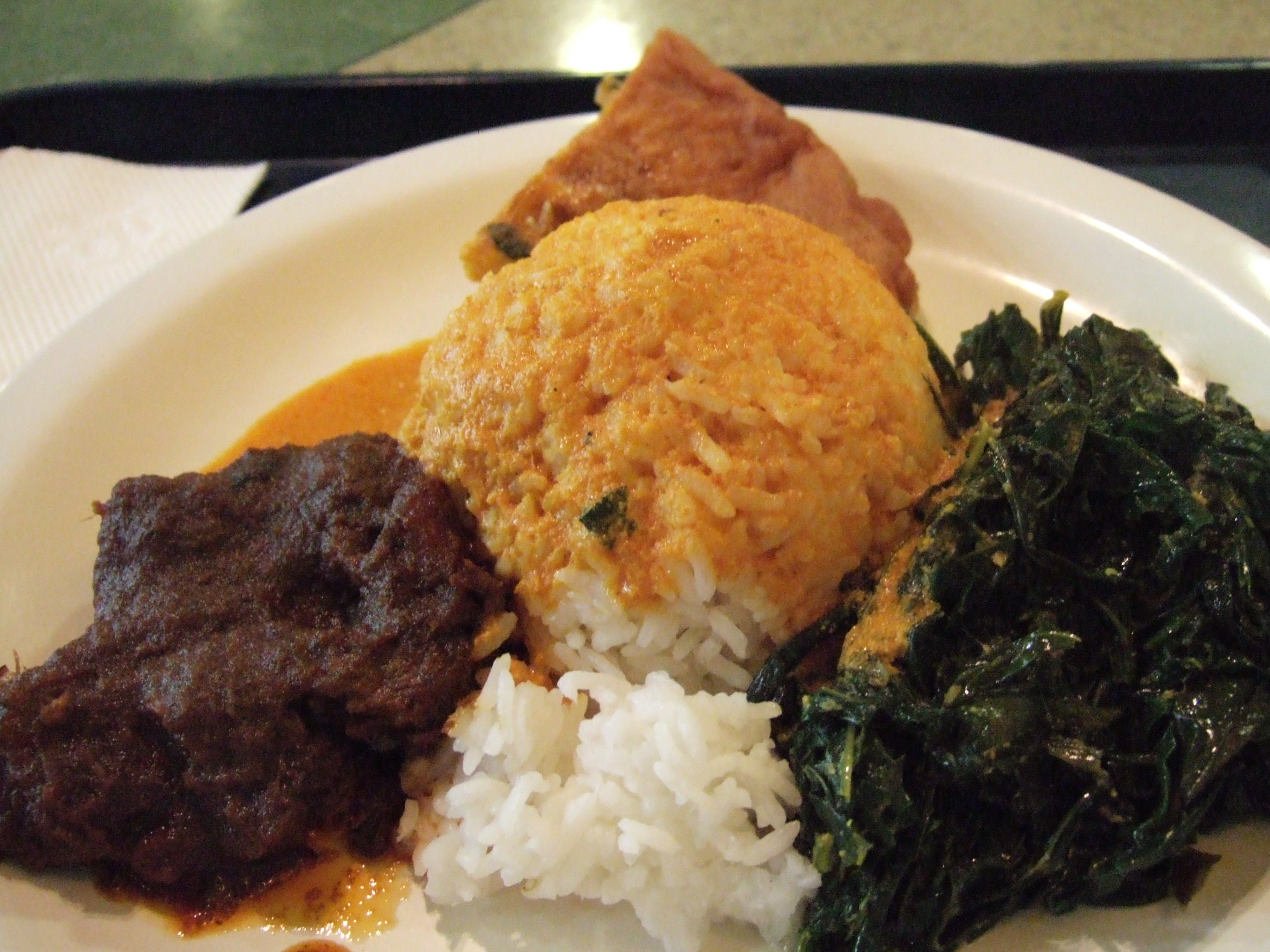
Rendang, beef slowly simmered in rich spice and coconut milk served in nasi padang, a Minang cuisine of Indonesia

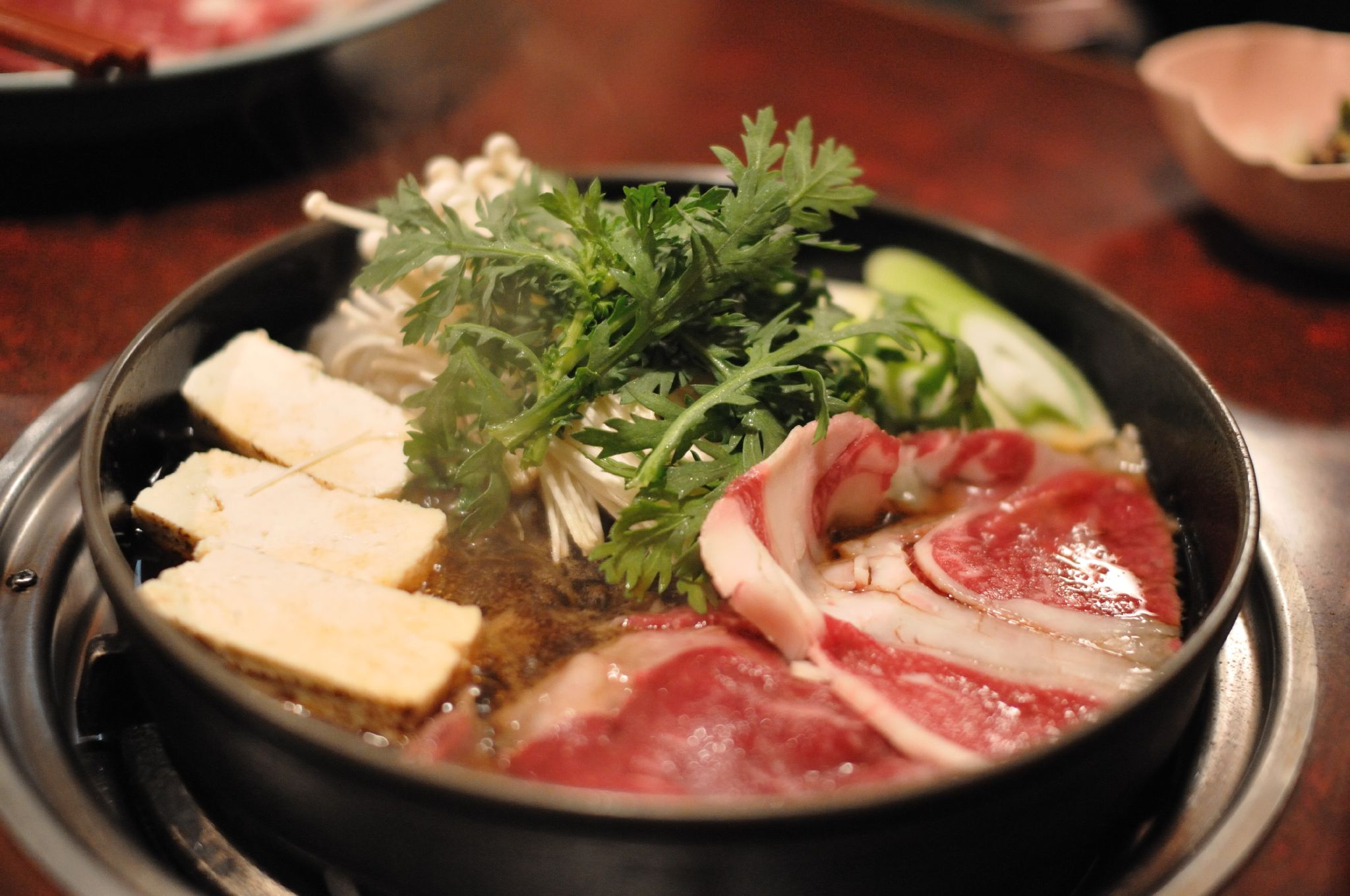
Sukiyaki

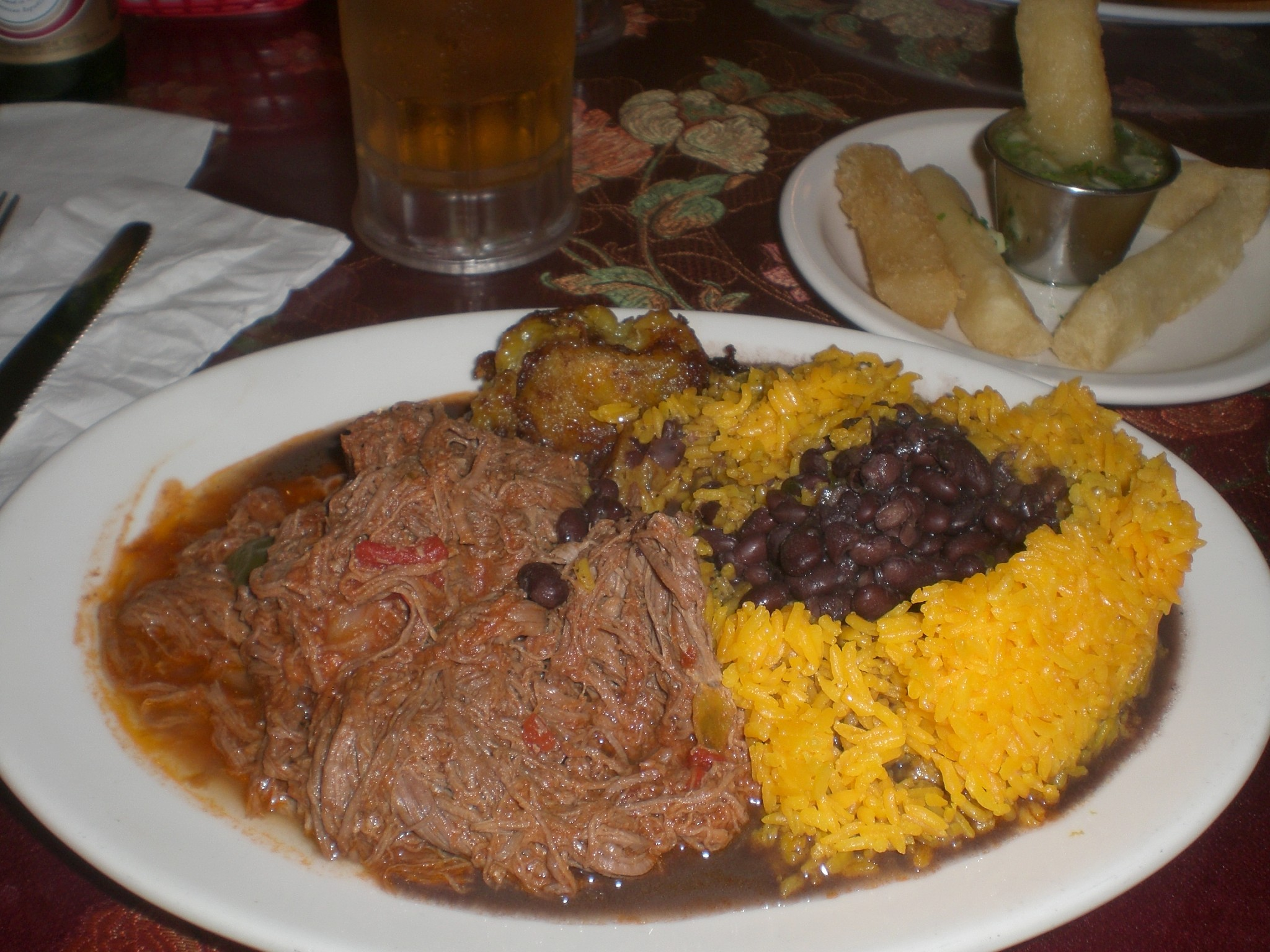
Ropa vieja (shredded flank steak in a tomato sauce base) with black beans, yellow rice, plantains and fried cassava

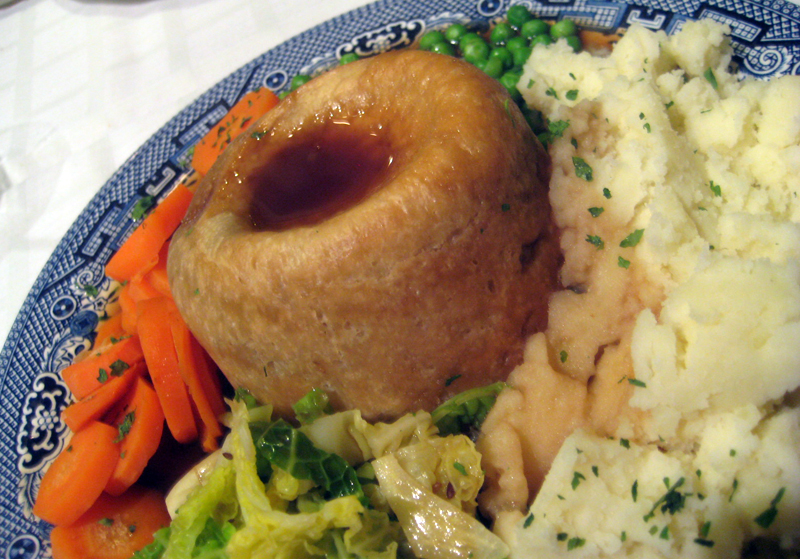
A small steak and kidney pudding, served with mashed potatoes and other vegetables

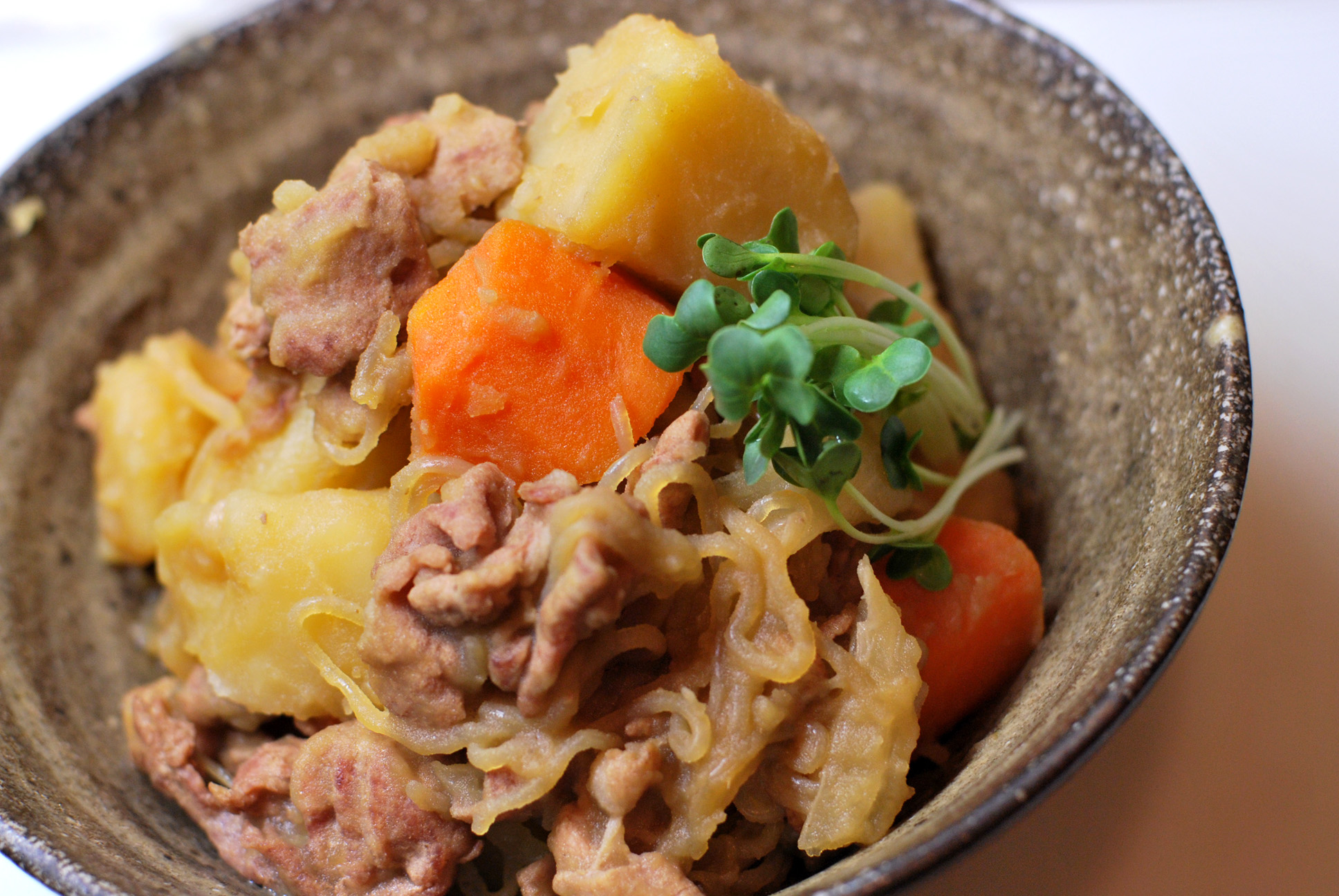
Nikujaga, a Japanese dish of meat, potatoes and onion

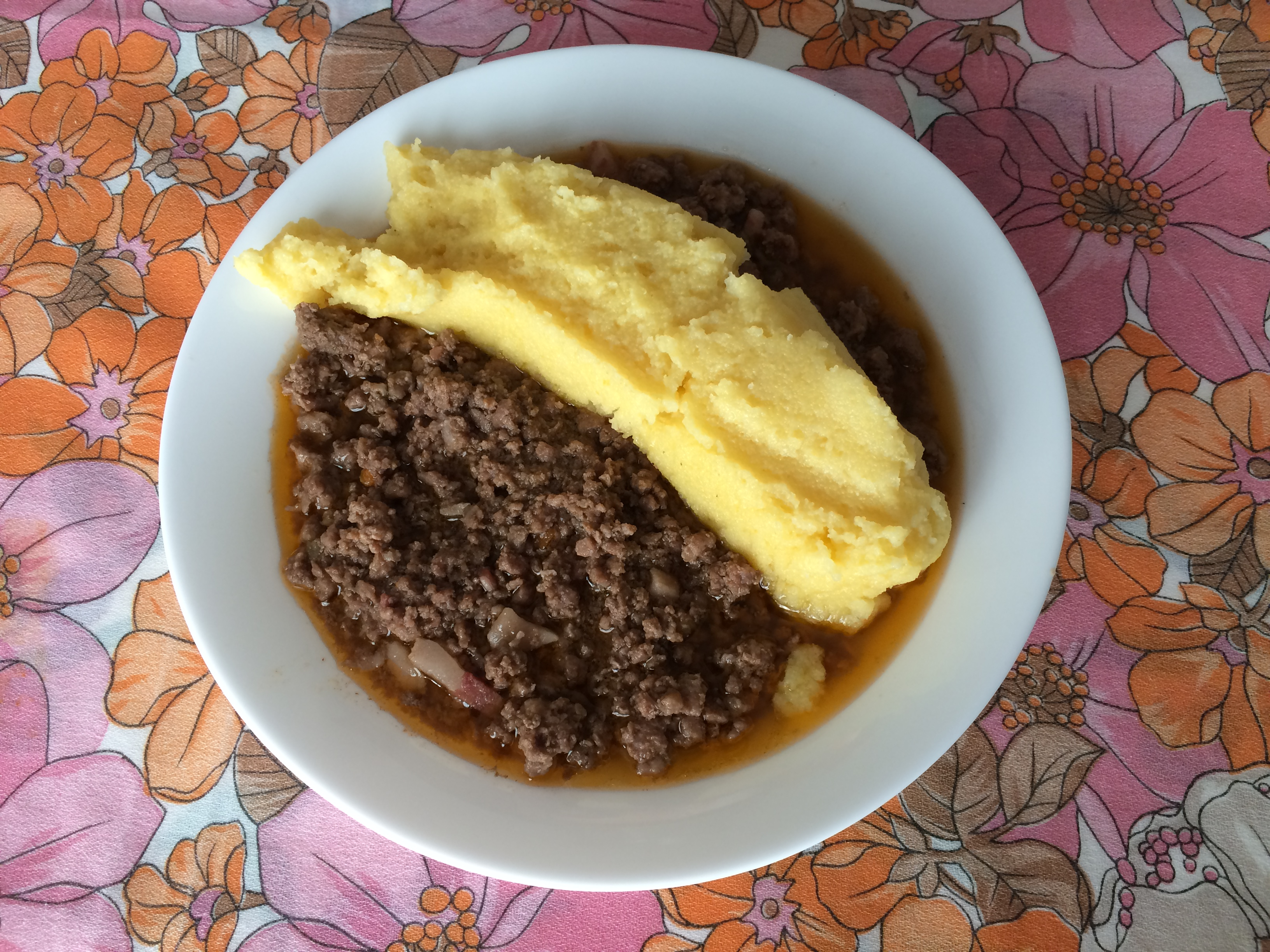
Bruscitti, an Italian single-course meal, served with polenta porridge

- Alambre – Mexican food
- Bakso – Indonesian meatball dish
- Balbacua – Filipino beef stew
- Bandeja paisa – Typical meal popular in Colombian cuisine
- Beef ball – Cantonese traditional beef dish
- Beef bun – Bun with beef filling
- Beef chow fun – Beef and noodle Cantonese dish
- Beef Hatkora – Bengali dish
- Beef Manhattan – Dish of roast beef and gravy
- Beef on weck – Roast beef sandwich on a kummelweck roll
- Beef Stroganoff – Russian sautéed beef dish with sauce
- Beef Wellington – Steak dish
- Beefsteak – Flat cut of beef
- Bife a cavalo – Steak and egg dish
- Bistecca alla fiorentina – Italian steak dish
- Bistec de Palomilla – Cuban beef dish
- Bistek – Filipino dish
- Bitok – Franco-Russian dish of minced meat formed into patties and fried; often served with a sour cream sauce
- Bitterballen – Savory Dutch meat-based snack
- Bò 7 món – Set selection of beef dishes
- Boeuf à la mode – French braised beef dish
- Boiled beef – Beef boiled with vegetables
- Borscht – Eastern European sour soup
- Braciolone – Italian meat dish
- Bruscitti – Italian beef dish
- Bulalo – Beef dish from the Philippines
- Bulgogi – Korean meat dish
- Bún bò Huế – Vietnamese beef noodle soup
- Carne asada – Grilled and sliced beef
- Carne de Ávila – Spanish protected geographic designation for beef
- Carne-de-sol – Beef dish from northeastern Brazil
- Chả lụa – Vietnamese sausage
- Chairo – Traditional soup in South America
- Charqui – Lean meat dried to prevent spoilage
- Chateaubriand – Front cut of a beef tenderloin
- Cheeseburger – Hamburger topped with cheese
- Chorrillana – Chilean dish
- Coda alla vaccinara – Oxtail stew in modern Roman cuisine
- Corned beef sandwich – Type of meat sandwich
- Cottage Pie – Pie of minced meat topped with mashed potato
- Cowboy beans – Popular dish in southwestern USA
- Crispy tadyang ng baka – Beef dish
- Curry beef turnover – Hong Kong pastry with curry beef filling
- Daube glacé – Jellied stew appetizer in New Orleans cuisine
- Dendeng – West Sumatran (Minangkabau) meat dish
- Empal gentong – Indonesian beef soup
- Empal gepuk – Indonesian sweet and spicy fried beef dish
- Filet mignon – Cut of beef
- Fillet of Beef Prince Albert – Foie gras wrapped in pounded beef tenderloin wrapped in bacon
- Flaki – Traditional Polish tripe stew
- French dip – Hot beef sandwich on a roll with broth
- Fuqi feipian – Spicy Sichuan beef dish
- Gaisburger Marsch – Traditional Swabian beef stew
- Galbi – Korean grilled beef or pork ribs
- Ghormeh – Type of curry
- Ginger beef – Canadian-Chinese beef dish
- Goulash – Hungarian meat and vegetable stew
- Guatitas – Ecuadorian tripe stew
- Gulyásleves – Hungarian soup
- Gyudon – Japanese cuisine
- Gyūtan – Japanese dish made from beef tongue
- Hamburger – Dish with patty between buns
  - List of hamburgers
- Hayashi rice – Japanese rice dish
- Hortobágyi palacsinta – Hungarian crêpes stuffed with meat
- Horumonyaki – Japanese dish of beef or pork offal
- Hot hamburger plate
- Kala bhuna – Bangladeshi meat curry
- Kamounia – Beef and liver stew prepared with cumin
- Kerala Beef Fry – Dish made of beef in Kerala
- Khash – Traditional dish in western Asia
- Labskaus – German corned beef dish
- Lengua estofado – Filipino beef tongue stew
- Lobscouse – Meat and potato stew
- Lomo a lo pobre – Peruvian beef tenderloin dish
- Lomo saltado – Peruvian stir-fry dish
- Machaca – Mexican dish
- Machacado con huevo – Mexican dish made of shredded beef
- Matambre – Thin cut of beef in South American cuisine
- Meat jun – Korean-Hawaiian fusion dish
- Meatball – Dish of ground meat rolled into a ball
- Meatloaf – Dish of baked or smoked shaped ground meat
- Mechado – Filipino braised beef dish
- Menudo – Mexican soup
- Millionbøf – Danish beef dish
- Mince and tatties – Scottish dish made from beef and potato
- Mocotó – Brazilian dish made from cow's feet
- Mongolian beef – Taiwanese beef dish
- Morcón – Filipino braised beef roulade
- Nikujaga – Japanese meat and potato dish
- Panackelty – Beef casserole dish from North East England
- Pares – Filipino braised beef stew
- Pašticada – Croatian braised beef dish
- Pho – Vietnamese noodle soup dish
- Picadillo – Ground meat and tomato dish popular in Latin America and the Philippines
- Pipikaula – Hawaiian dish of salted and dried beef similar to beef jerky
- Pique macho – Bolivian beef dish
- Pit beef – Roast beef prepared over a charcoal fire
- Posta sudada – Traditional Colombian meat dish
- Pot roast – Type of roasted beef dish
- Prime rib – Cut of steak
- Quesobirria – Mexican dish
- Rambak petis – Javanese snack food
- Rendang – Southeast Asian dish
- Rinderbraten – German stuffed beef dish
- Roast beef – Traditional English dish of beef which is roasted
- Roast beef sandwich – Sandwich made from roast beef
- Rocky Mountain oysters – Fried bull testicles
- Rollatini – Italian-style dish
- Ropa vieja – Stewed beef with vegetables dish
- Rouladen – Dish of filled rolled meat or pastry
- Rundstück warm – Warm slice of meat served in a halved roll
- Salată de boeuf – Cold beef salad
- Scaloppine – Type of Italian meat dish
- Semur – Indonesian meat stew
- Sha cha beef – Chinese dish of shacha sauce and beef strips
- Sha Phaley – Tibetan dish of bread, beef, and vegetables
- Shabu-shabu – Japanese hotpot dish
- Shredded beef – Preparation of beef that features in various cuisines
  - List of shredded beef dishes – Preparation of beef that features in various cuisines
- Skomakarlåda – Swedish meat dish
- Sloppy joe – Variety of sandwich made with ground meat
- Spiced beef – Form of salt beef
- Steak – Flat cut of meat
  - List of steak dishes
- Steamed meatball – Cantonese dim sum dish
- Stovies – Scottish potato dish
- Suadero – Thin cut of meat in Mexican cuisine
- Sukiyaki – Japanese hot pot dish
- Surf and turf – Dish containing seafood and meat
- Svíčková – Meat and vegetable stew
- Tafelspitz – Dish made of boiled meat in Viennese cuisine
- Tarta de seso – Beef brain pie in Colombian cuisine
- Tavern sandwich – Ground beef sandwich
- Thịt bò nướng lá lốt – Vietnamese beef in lolot leaves
- Tongue toast – Open sandwich of beef tongue and eggs
- Tournedos Rossini – French steak dish
- Tourtière – French-Canadian meat pie dish
- Vanillerostbraten – Austrian beef cutlet dish
- Wagyu Japanese beef
- Yakiniku – Korean-style grilled meat cuisine in Japan
- Yukgaejang – Korean spicy beef soup
- Yukhoe – Korean raw meat dish
- Yukpo – Korean dried meat strips
- Zrazy – Meat roulade dish
Beef dishes

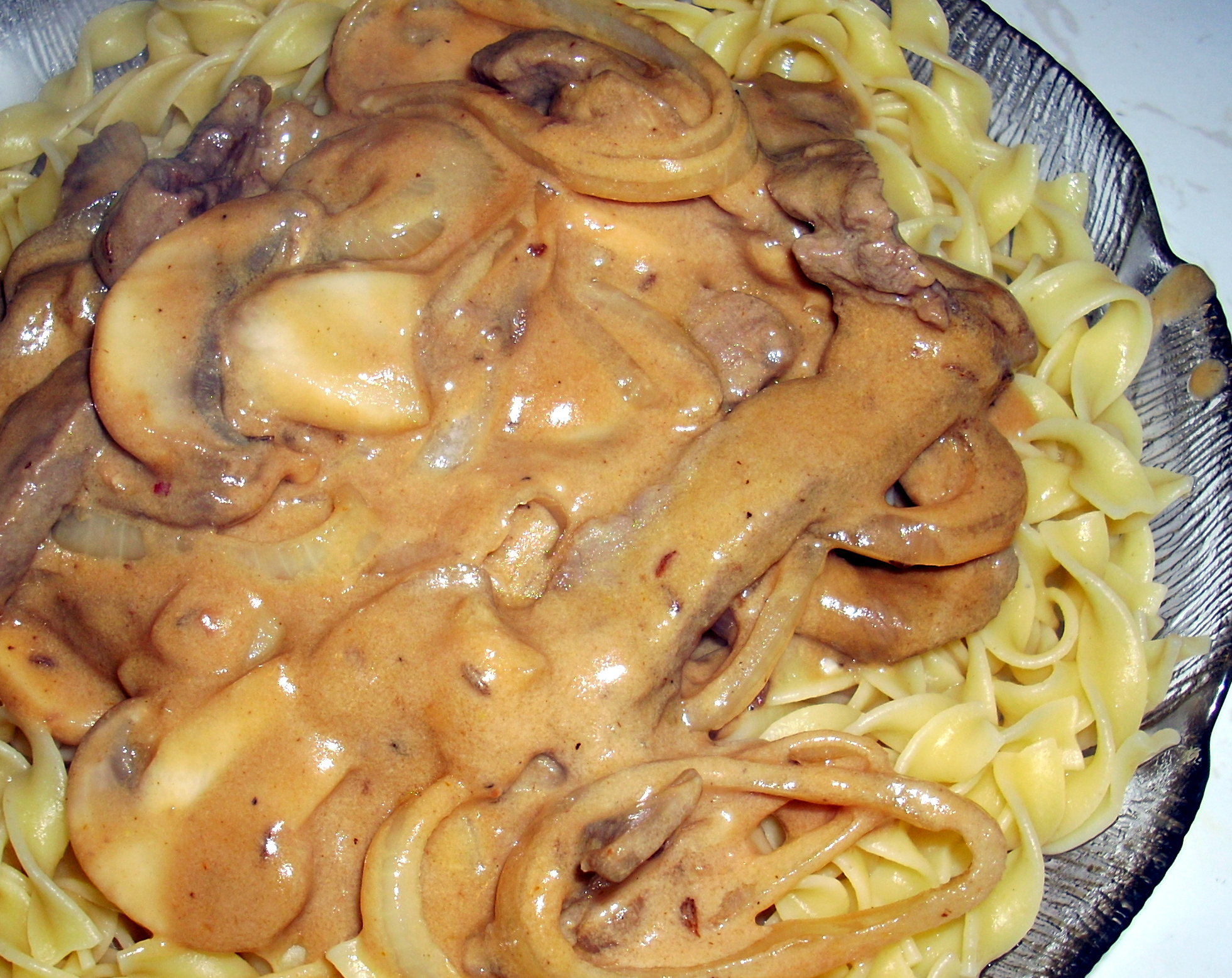
Beef Stroganoff atop pasta

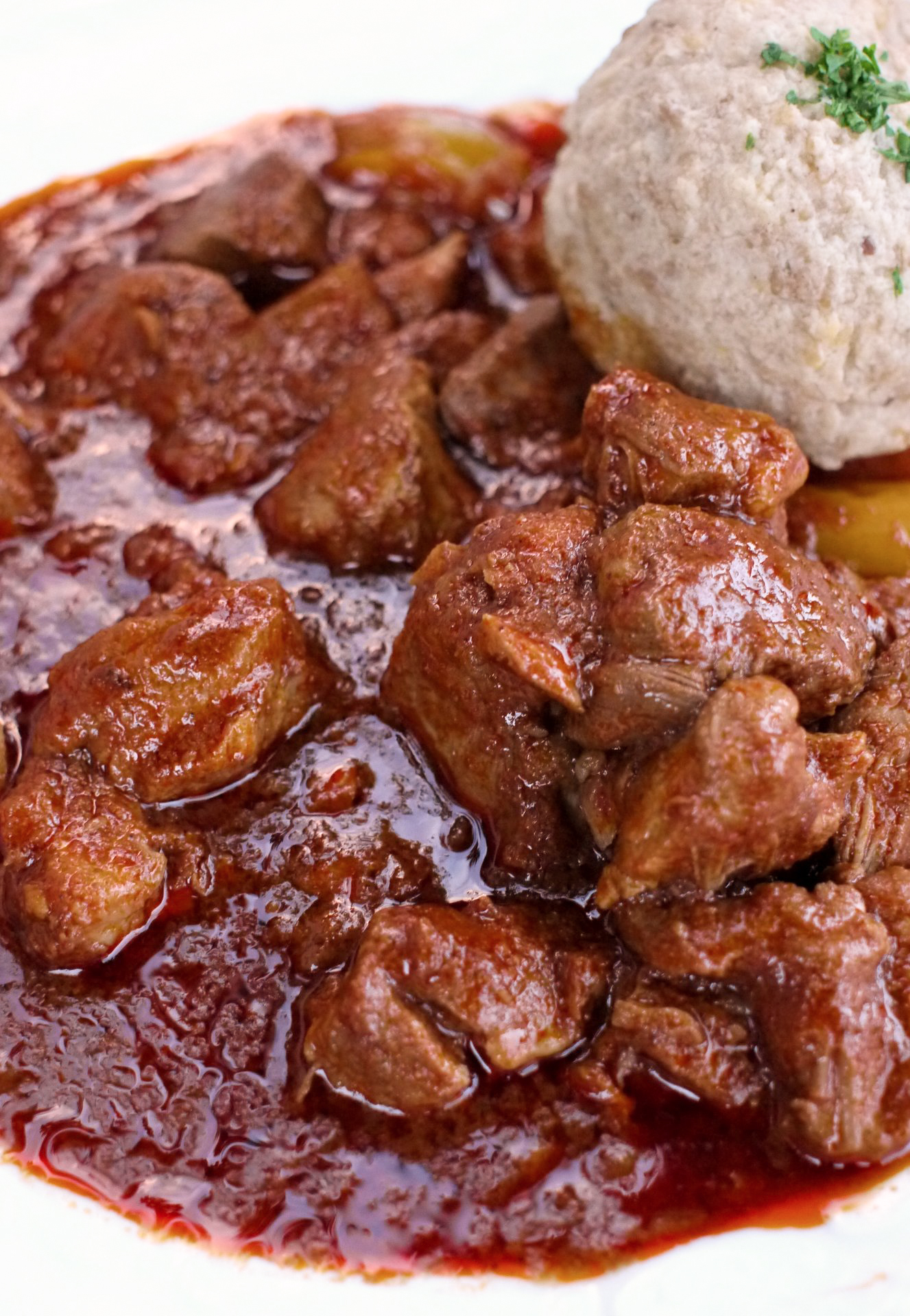
Goulash in Bavaria is often made with a mix of beef and pork, and served with a bread dumpling.

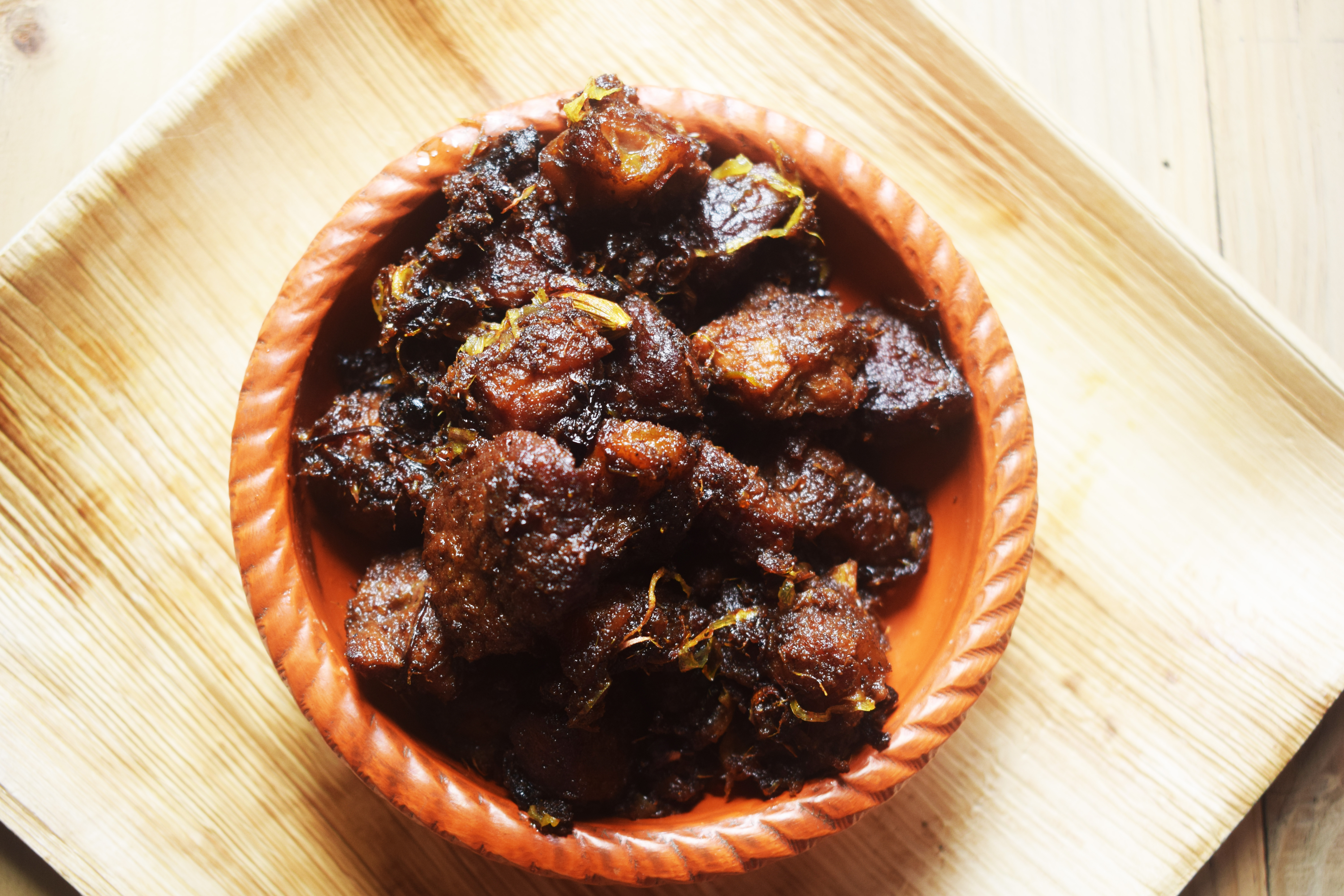
Kala bhuna, a traditional beef curry from Chittagong, Bangladesh. It can be also made with mutton.

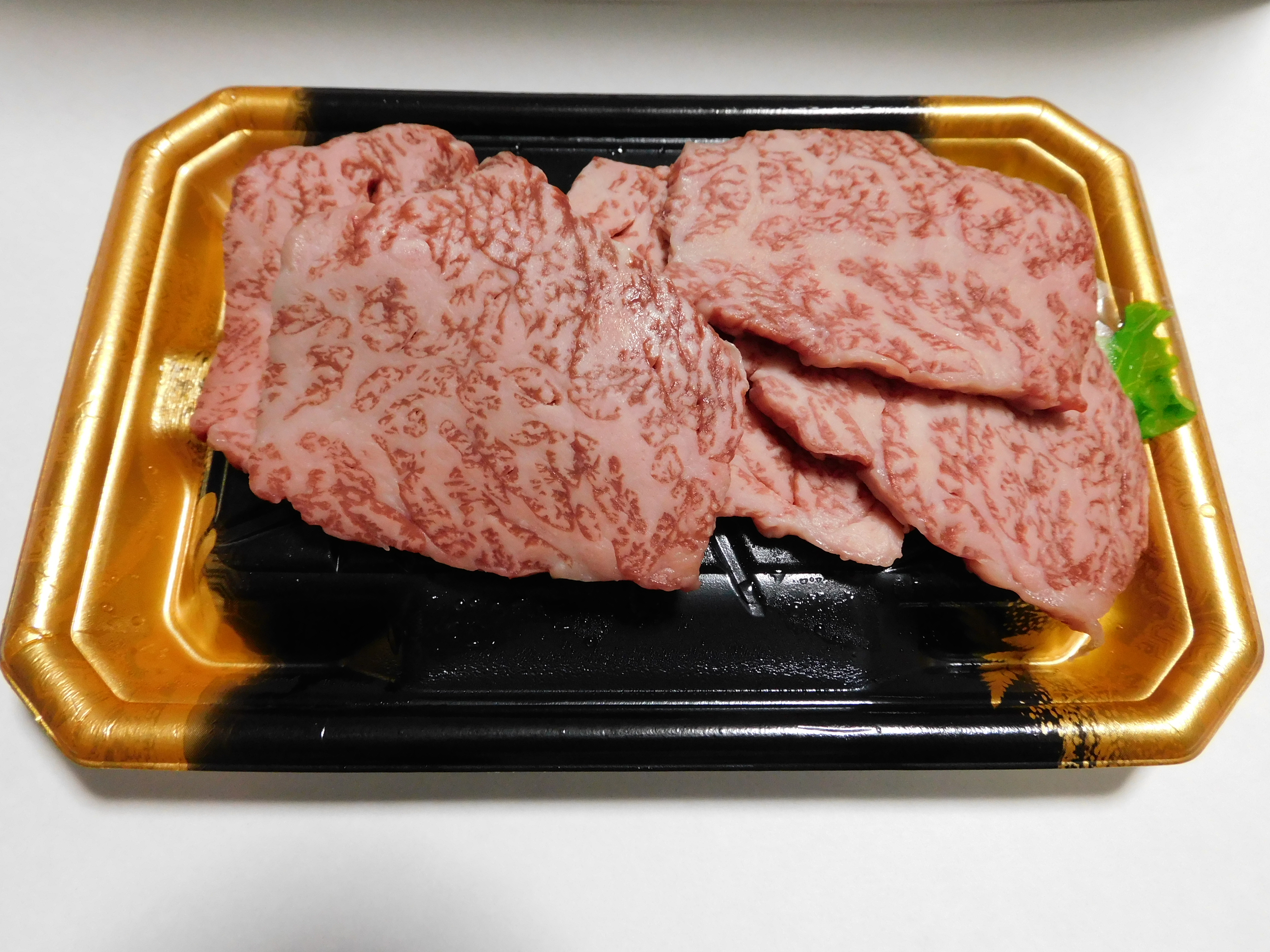
Wagyu beef plate

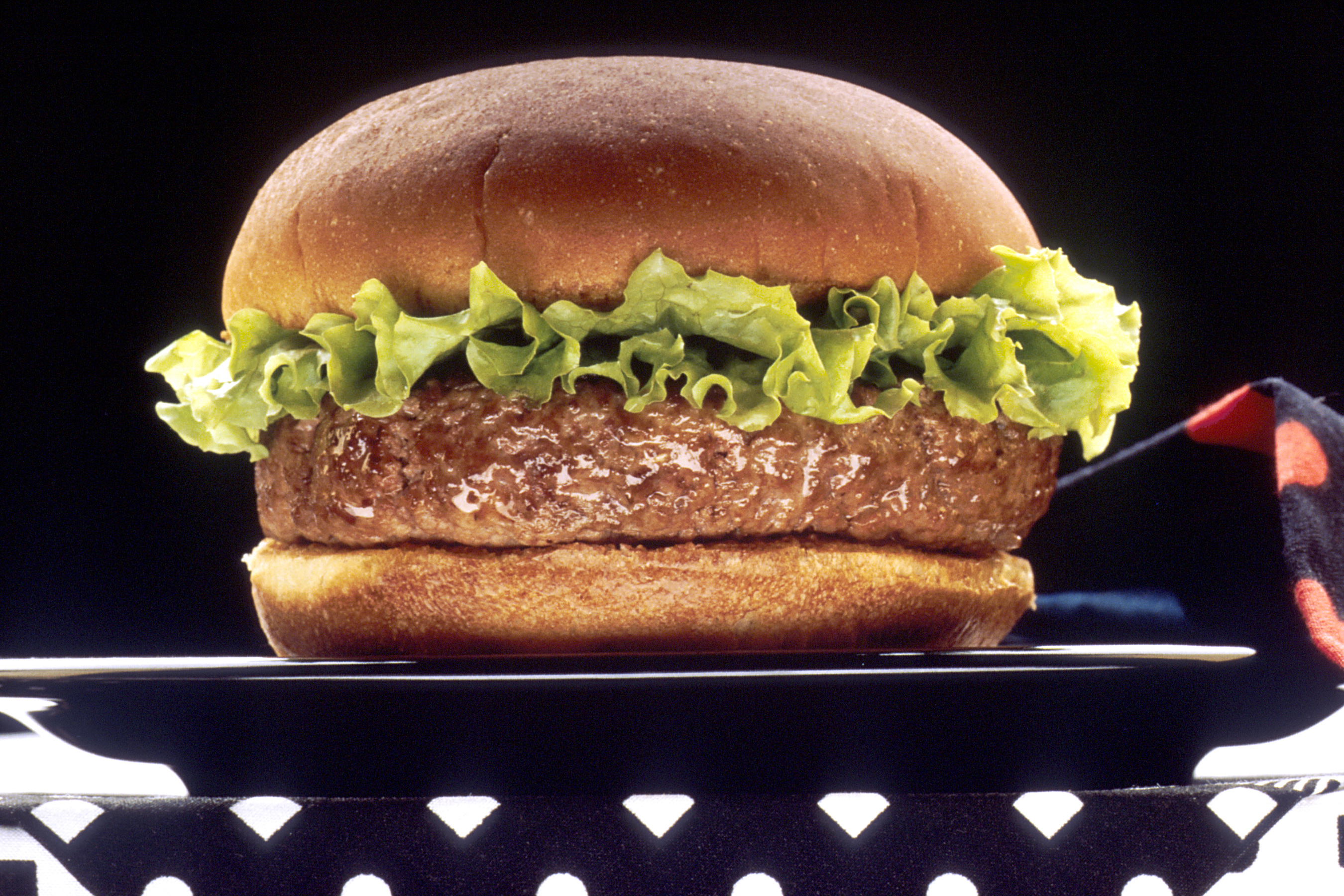
A hamburger

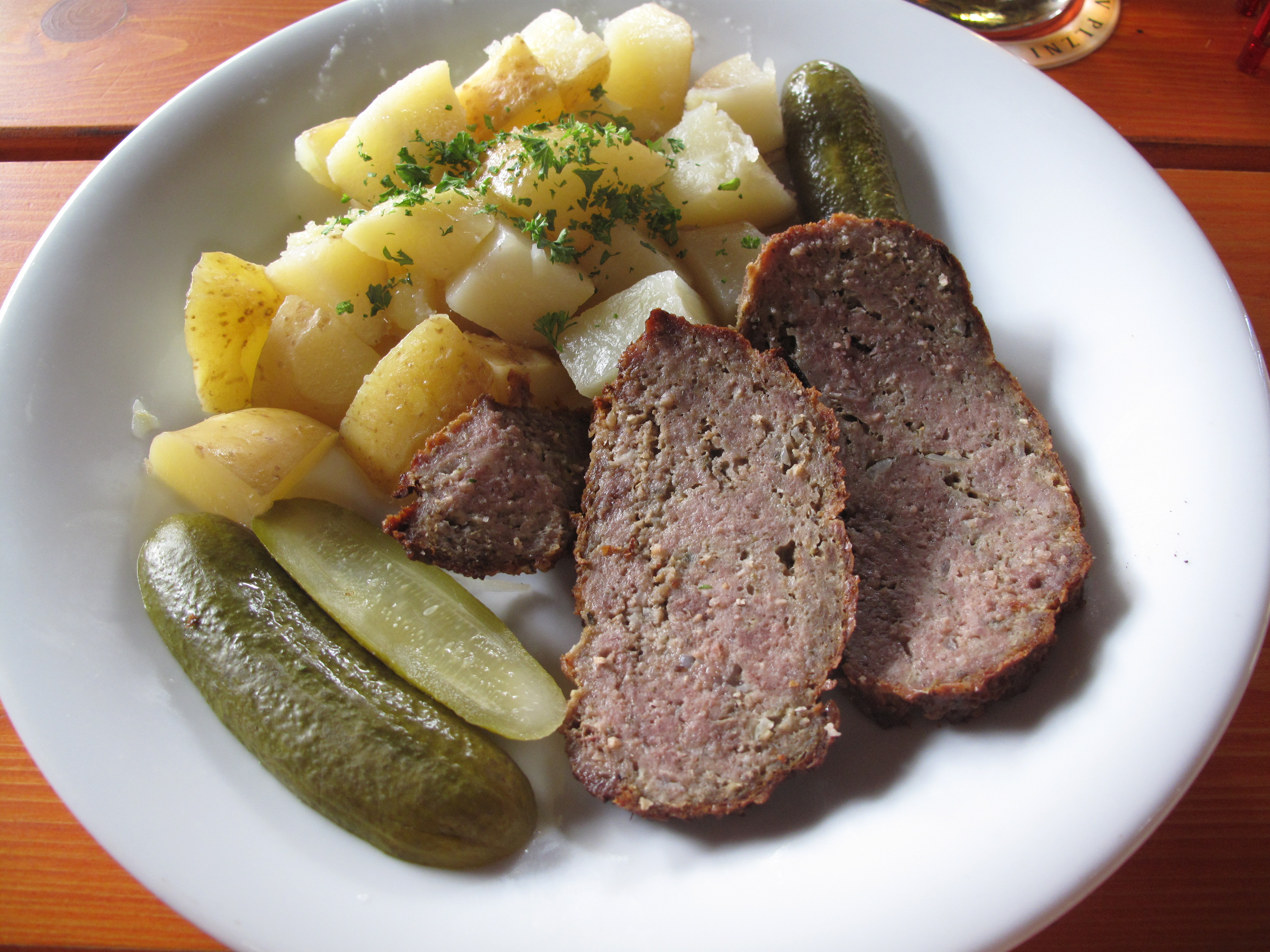
Meatloaf with potatoes and pickled cucumber

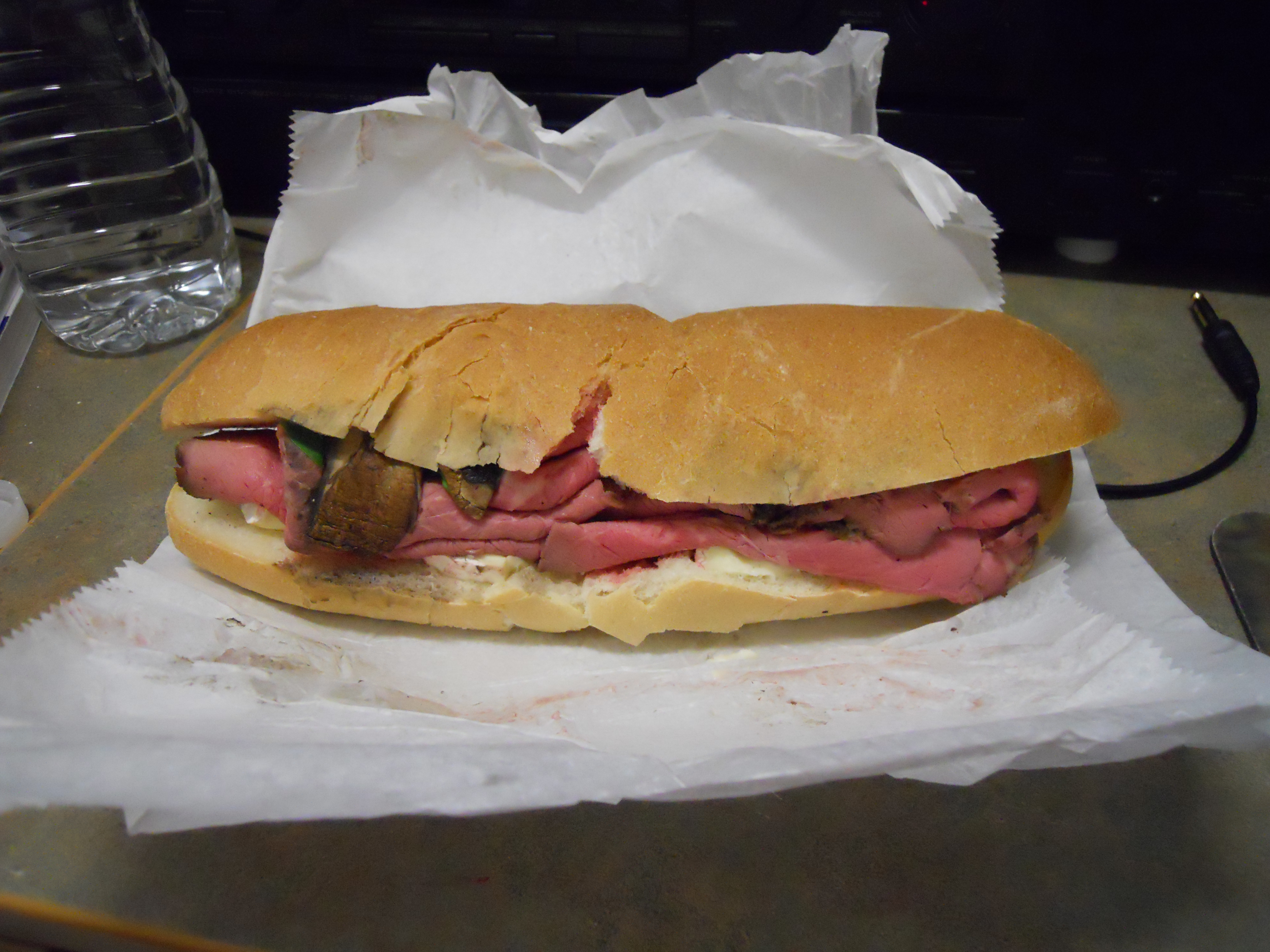
A roast beef sandwich

== Raw beef dishes ==
- Amsterdam ossenworst – Dutch sausage
- Carpaccio – Thin pieces of fish or meat, served raw as an appetiser
- Çiğ köfte – Middle Eastern raw meatball dish
- Crudos – German-Chilean dish with raw beef and bread
- Gored gored – Ethiopian raw beef dish
- Kachilaa – Newari marinated raw minced meat from Nepal
- Kibbeh nayyeh – Levantine mezze
- Kitfo – Ethiopian raw beef dish
- Pittsburgh rare – Method of cooking steak
- Steak tartare – Dish of finely chopped raw beef
- Tiger meat – Raw beef dish
- Yukhoe – Korean raw meat dish
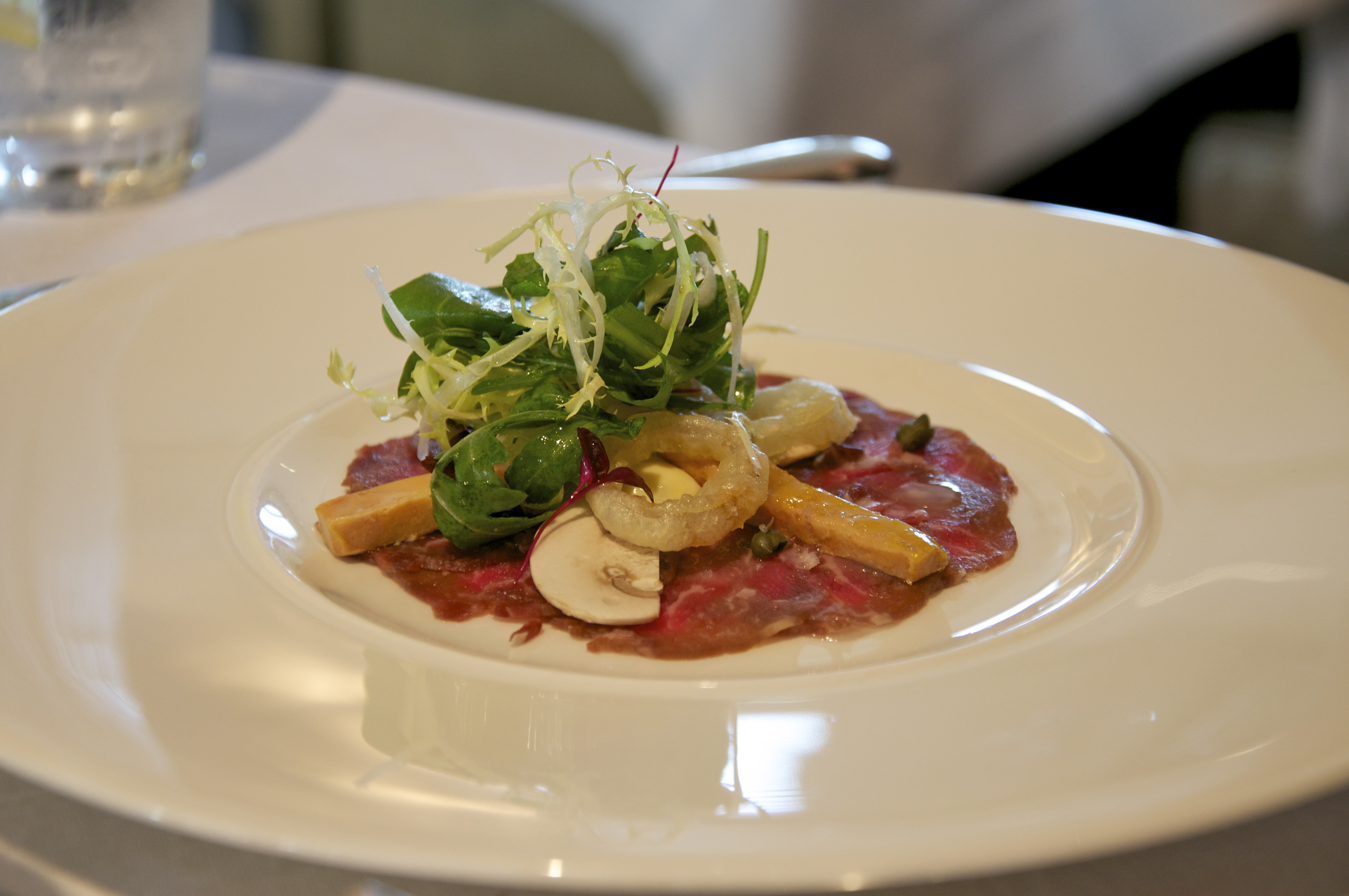
Beef carpaccio with toppings

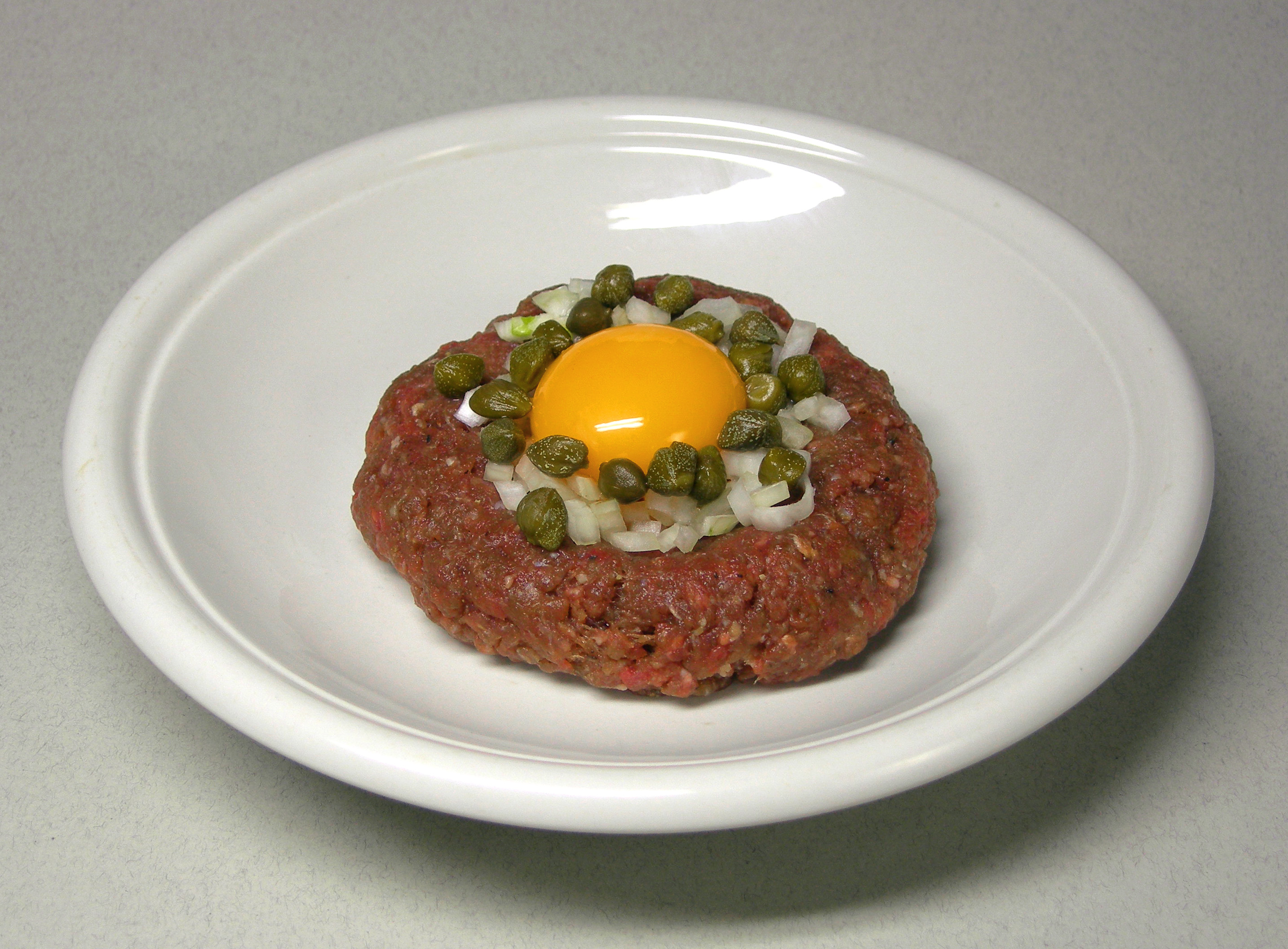
Steak tartare is a meat dish made from finely chopped or minced raw beef, venison, or horse meat.

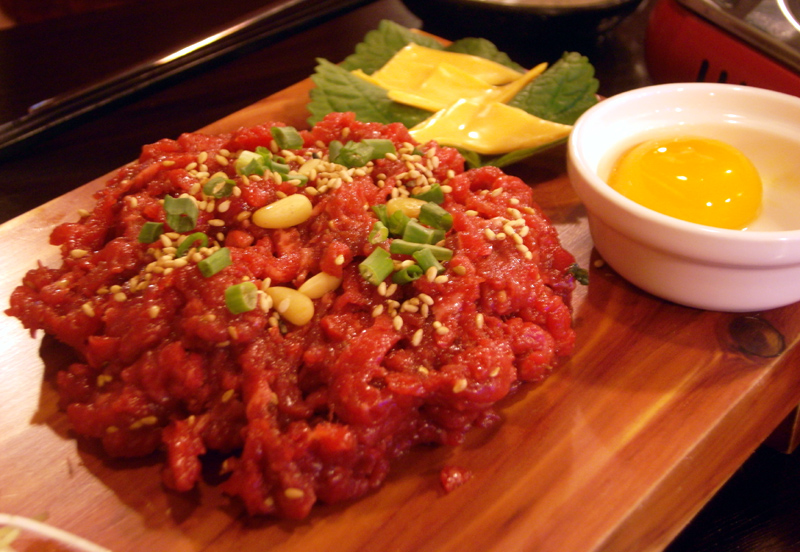
Yukhoe is a variety of hoe (raw dishes in Korean cuisine), which are usually made from raw ground beef seasoned with various spices or sauces.

== Veal dishes ==
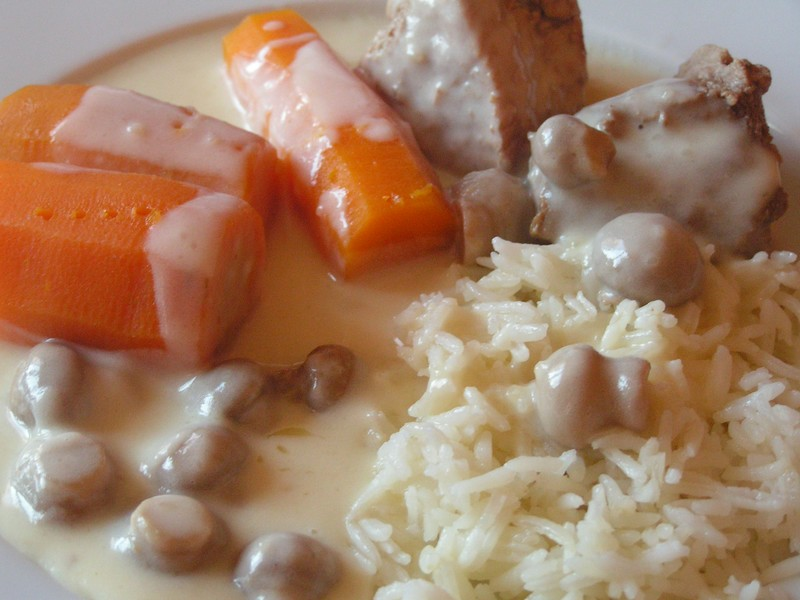
Blanquette de veau is a French veal ragout.

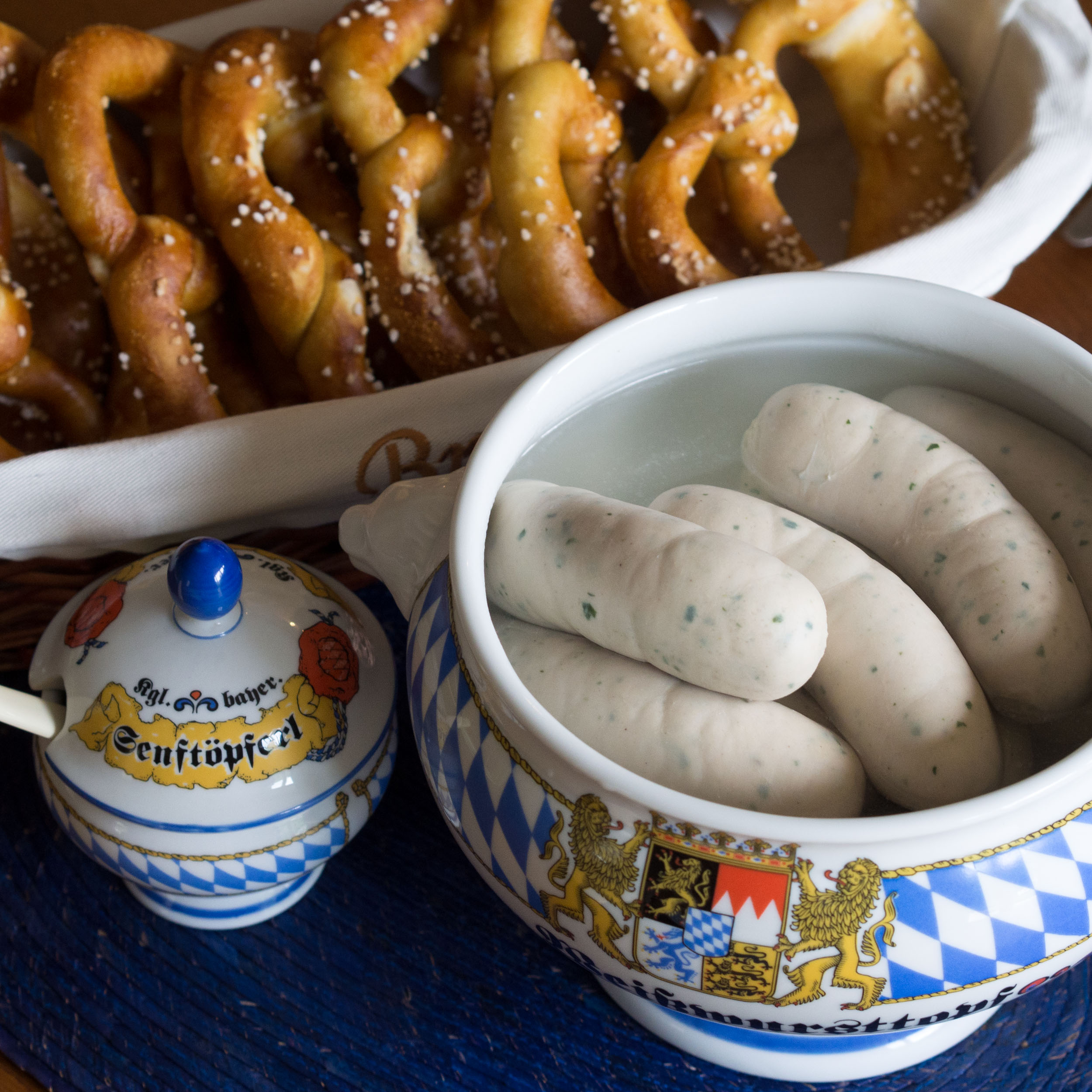
Weisswurst is a traditional Bavarian sausage made from very finely minced veal and fresh pork back bacon. It is served here with pretzels and sweet mustard.

Veal is the meat of young cattle (calves), in contrast to the beef from older cattle. Though veal can be produced from a calf of either sex and any breed, most veal comes from male calves (bull calves) of dairy cattle breeds. Generally, veal is more expensive than beef from older cattle.

- Blanquette de veau – French veal ragout
- Bockwurst – German sausage
- Bratwurst – Type of sausage
- Calf's liver and bacon – Dish containing calf's liver and bacon
- Carpaccio – Thin pieces of fish or meat, served raw as an appetiser
- Cotoletta – Italian word for a breaded veal cutlet
- Hortobágyi palacsinta – Hungarian crêpes stuffed with meat
- Jellied veal – Swedish cold cut dish
- Ossobuco – Italian dish from Lombard region
- Pariser Schnitzel – French veal cutlet
- Parmigiana – Italian dish of eggplant with cheese and tomato sauce
- Paupiette – French meat dish
- Ragout fin – Food
- Saltimbocca – Italian dish
- Scaloppine – Type of Italian meat dish
- Schnitzel – Breaded, fried flat piece of meat
- Tourtière – French-Canadian meat pie dish
- Veal Orloff – French dish named for Russian diplomat
- Veal Oscar – Dish of veal or beef, crab, and sauce
- Vitello tonnato – Veal dish
- Wallenbergare – Swedish veal dish
- Weisswurst – Traditional Bavarian sausage
- Wiener Schnitzel – Viennese meat dish, breaded veal cutlet
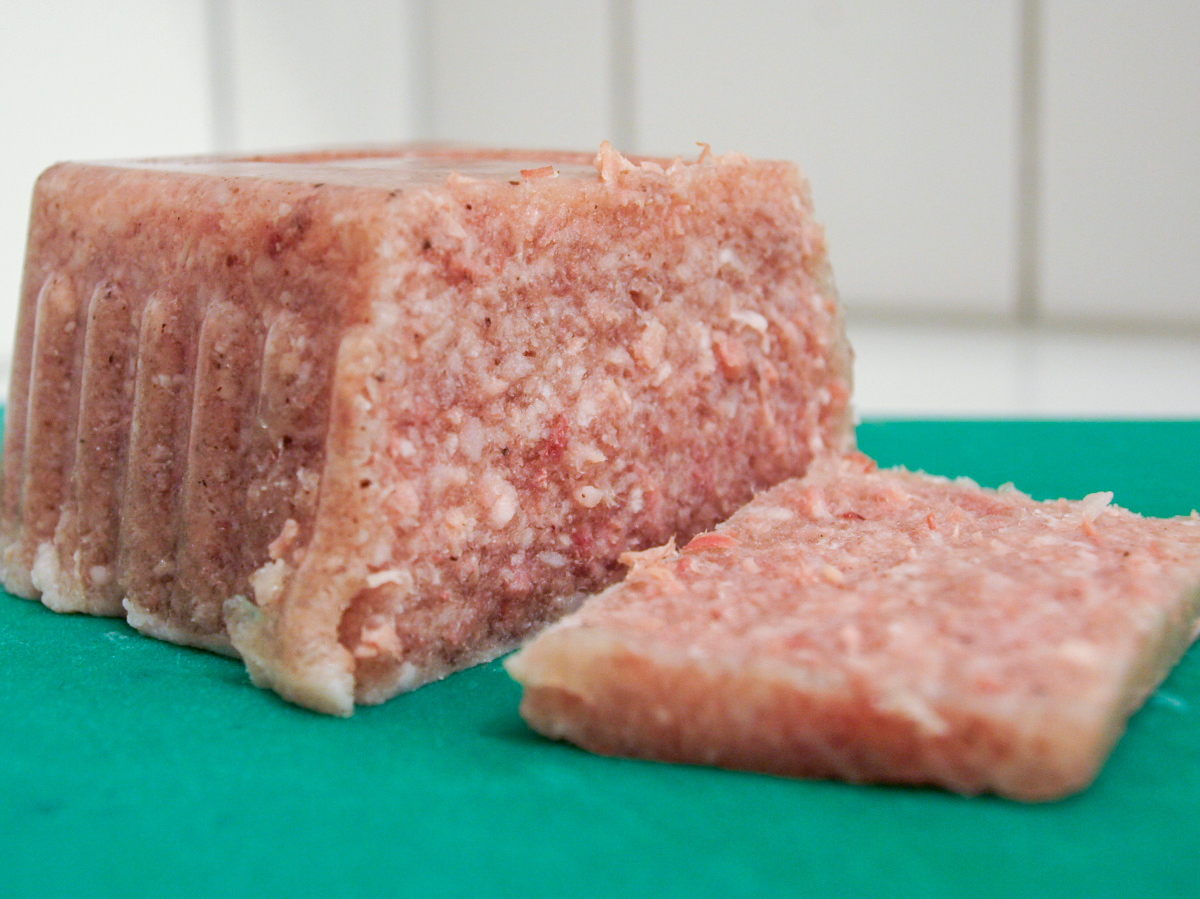
Jellied veal is a cold cut dish made from veal, sometimes pork, stock, onion and spices such as allspice, bay leaf and white pepper.

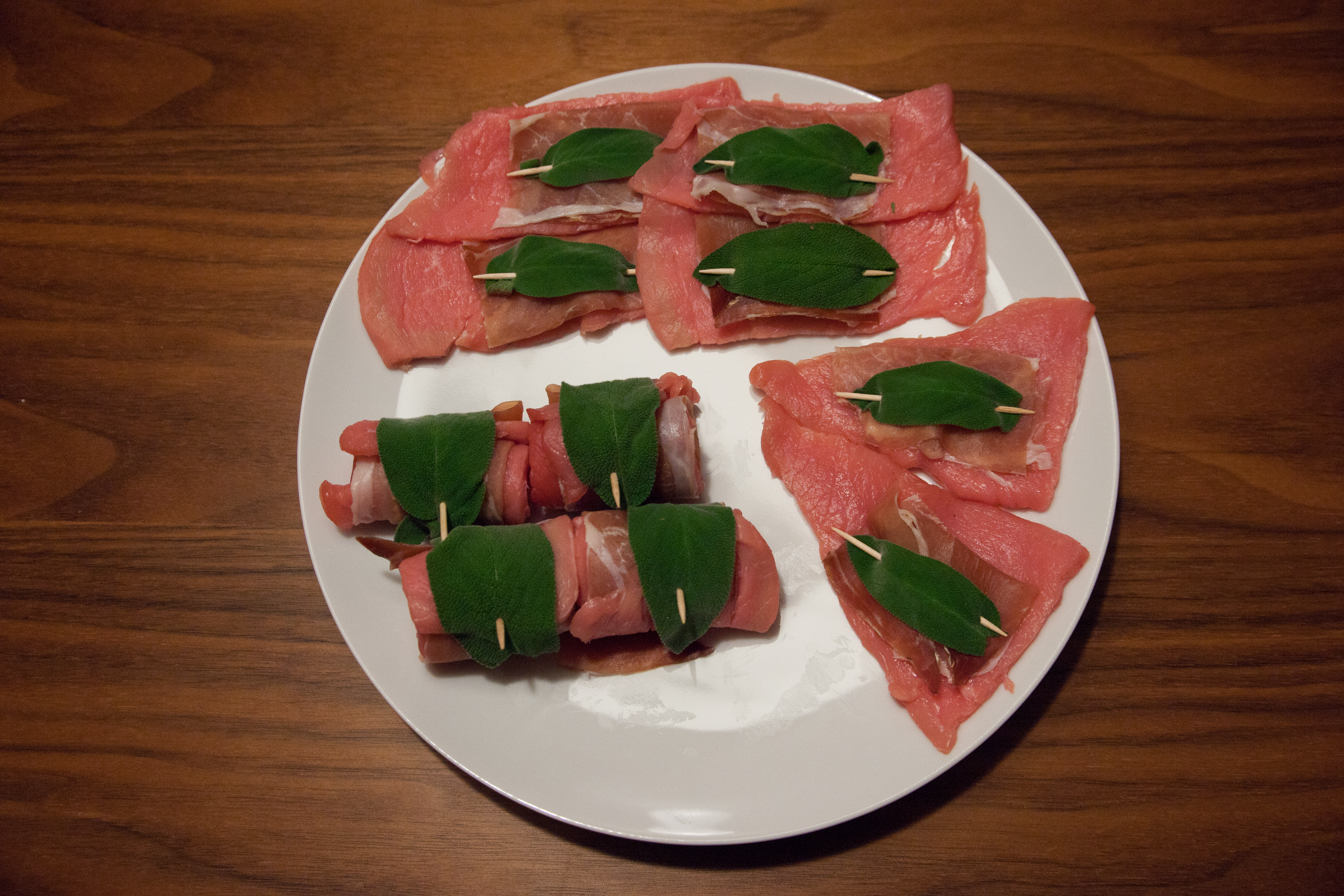
Raw saltimbocca prior to being cooked

== See also ==
- Beefsteak
- Cut of beef
- List of chicken dishes
- List of fish dishes
- List of hamburgers
- List of lamb dishes
- List of meatball dishes
- List of pork dishes
- List of seafood dishes
- List of steak dishes
- List of veal dishes
- Steakhouse
- Wagyu
