= Shredded beef =

Preparation of beef that features in various cuisines

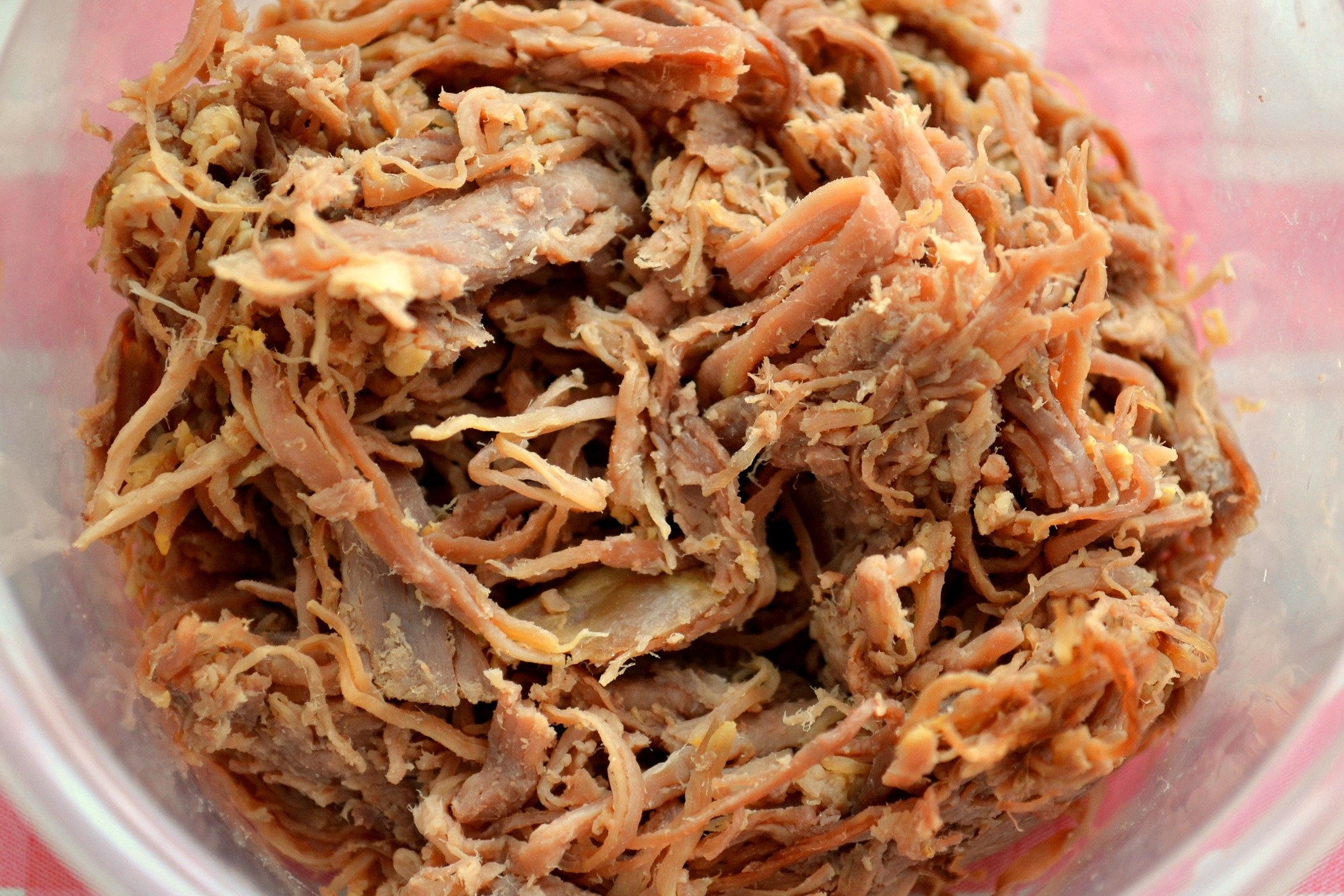
Shredded beef

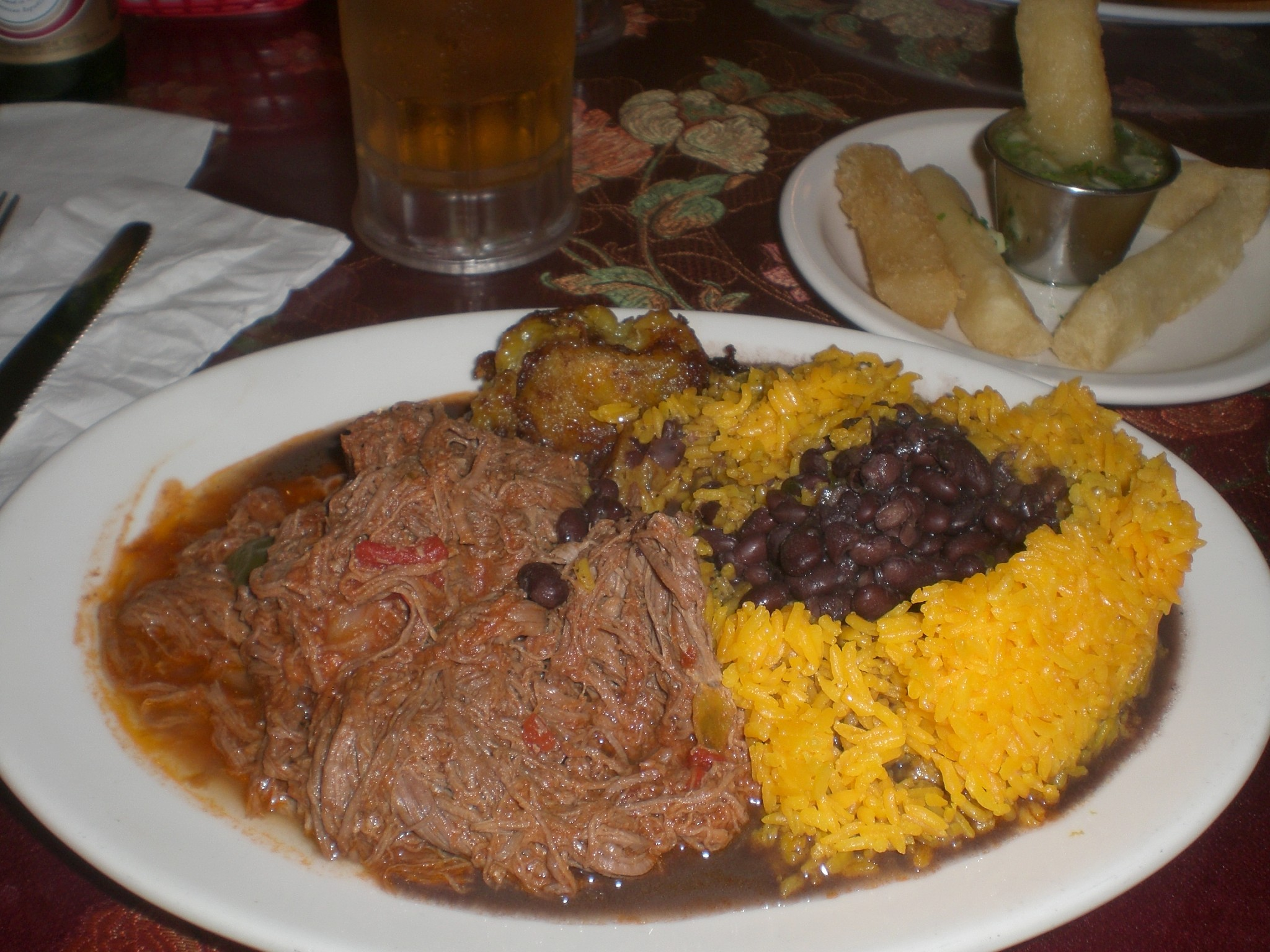
Cuban ropa vieja (shredded flank steak in a tomato sauce base), black beans, yellow rice, plantains and fried yuca served with a beer

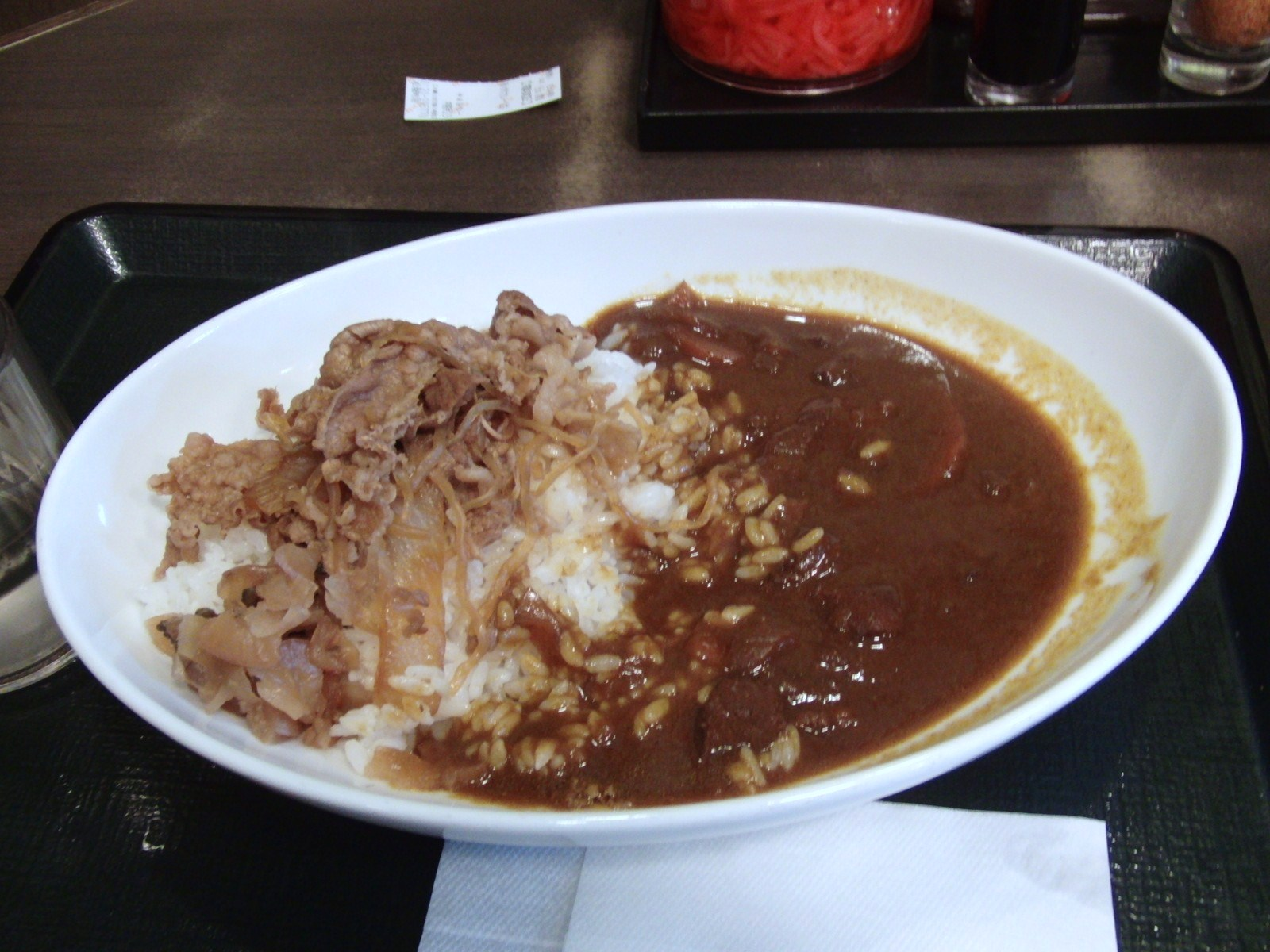
Japanese curry with shredded beef

Shredded beef, also known as pulled beef, is a preparation of beef that features in dishes from various cuisines. Shredded beef is sometimes prepared using beef brisket and chuck roast. Pot roast is also sometimes shredded.

== List of shredded beef dishes ==
- Burritos are sometimes prepared with shredded beef.
- Carne asada is sometimes shredded.
- Shredded beef is one of several meat fillings that can be used to make gorditas.
- Enchiladas are sometimes prepared with shredded beef.
- Jang-jorim is made with shredded beef.
- Machacado con huevo is a shredded dry beef and scrambled egg dish believed to have originated in Ciénega de Flores, Mexico.
- Mission burritos can be made with stewed and shredded beef (machaca).
- Pabellón criollo is a shredded beef stew served with a plate of rice and black beans that is considered by many to be Venezuela's national dish.
- In Mexico, picadillo is made with shredded beef.
- Quesadilla
- Ropa vieja (old clothes) originated in the Canary Islands (Spain) and is typically a shredded flank, brisket or skirt steak in a tomato sauce base.
- Salpicon is a salad that includes shredded beef and is common in Mexico.
- Sandwiches
- Tacos are sometimes prepared with shredded beef.
- Tangpyeongchae (Korean pronunciation: [tʰaŋpʰjʌŋtɕʰɛ]) is a Korean cuisine dish made by mixing julienned nokdumuk, mung bean sprouts, watercress, stir-fried shredded beef, thinly shredded red pepper and lightly broiled gim. It was part of the Korean royal court cuisine. It is seasoned with a sauce made with ganjang, vinegar, sugar, sesame seeds and sesame oil. It is often made with nokdumuk, a type of jelly.
- Tinga is a Mexican dish usually prepared with shredded beef or chicken.
- Yukgaejang is a spicy Korean soup made from shredded beef with scallions and other ingredients simmered together. It is a variety of gomguk once part of Korean royal court cuisine and is believed to be healthful.
- Yukhoe was made with shredded beef marinated in spring onion, minced garlic, pepper, oil, honey, pine nuts, sesame and salt, according to the 19th-century cookbook Siuijeonseo It is served with a dipping sauce, chogochujang (Hangul: 초고추장), chili pepper condiment mixed with vinegar and sugar) can be altered to taste, with pepper or honey.
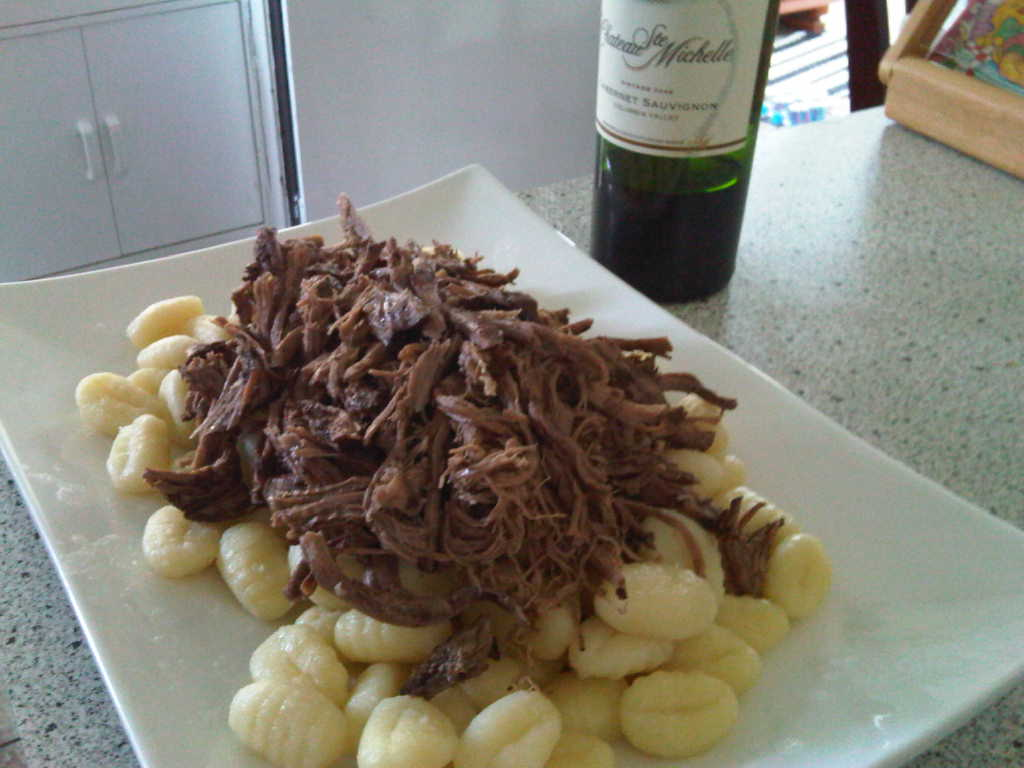
Unsauced shredded beef atop gnocchi

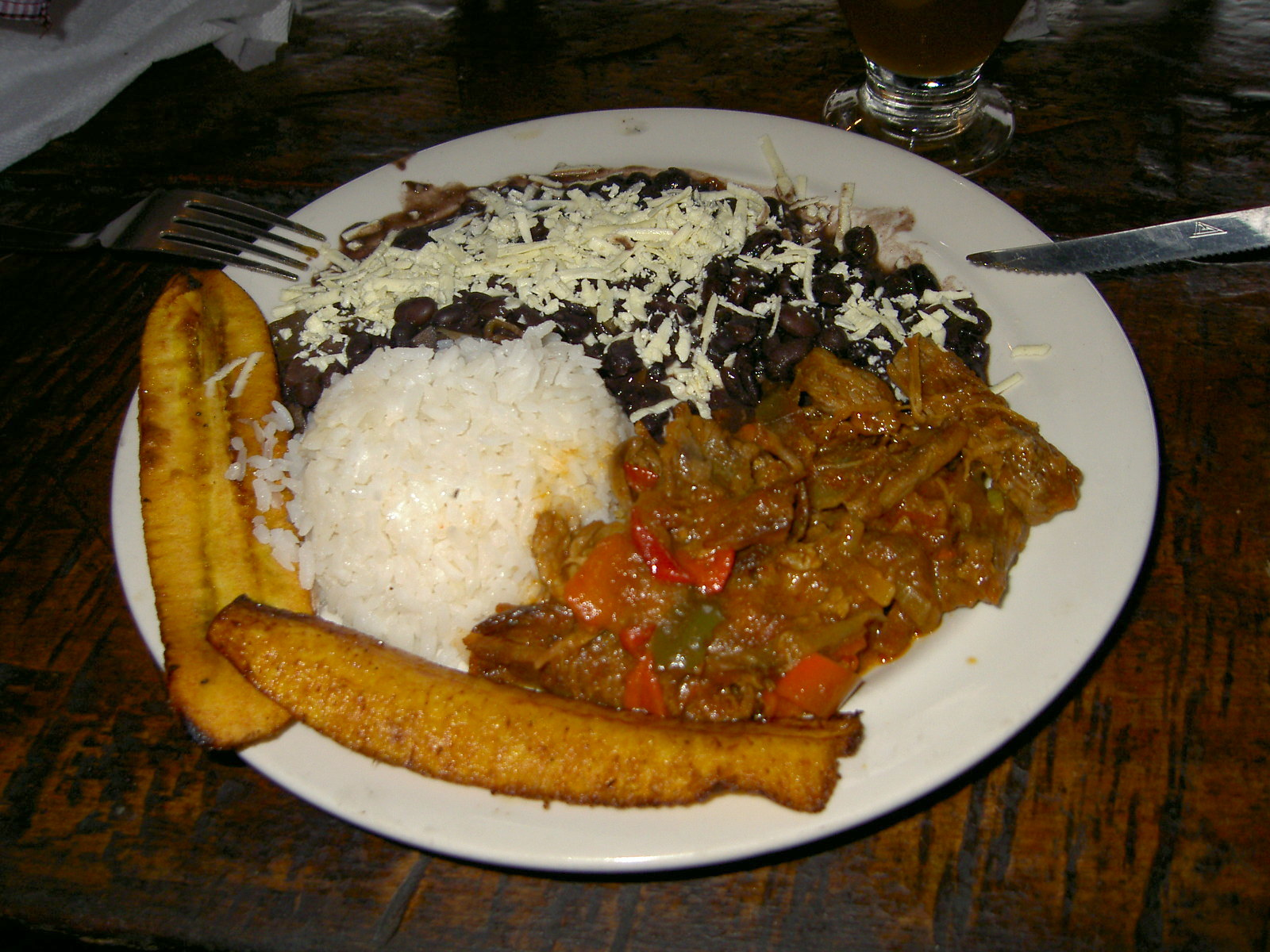
Pabellón criollo (below right), with beans, fried plantain and rice

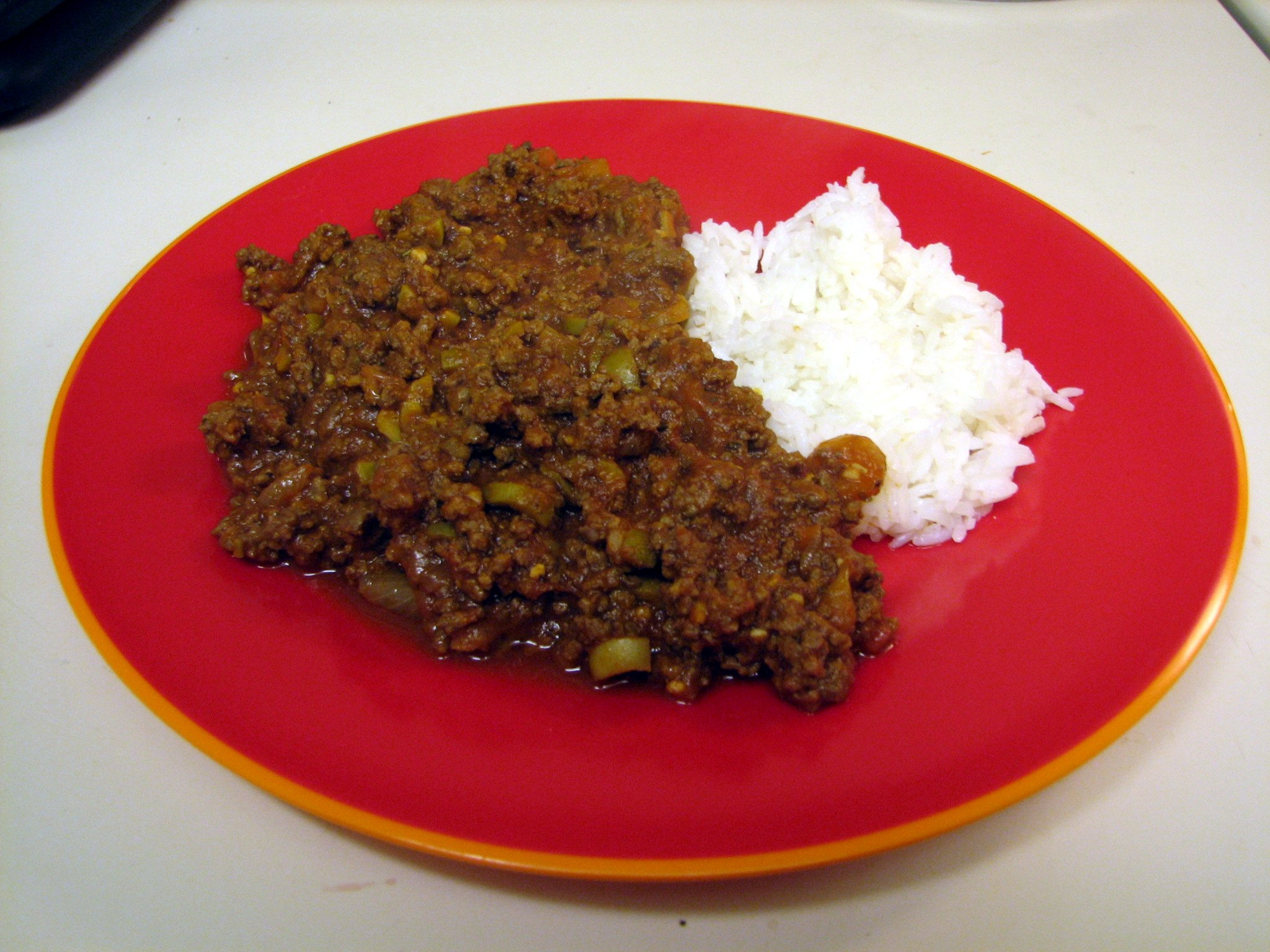
Picadillo served with rice

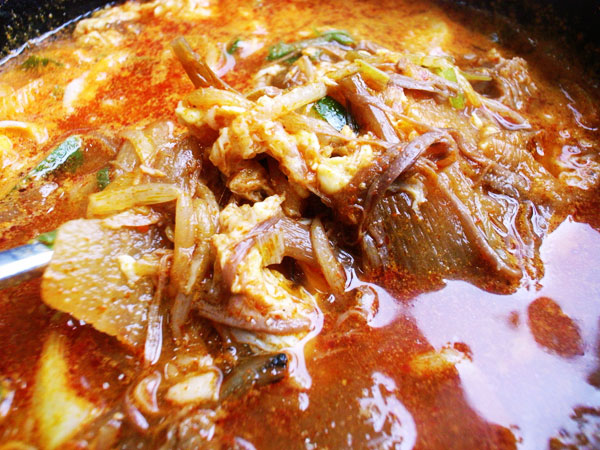
Yukgaejang

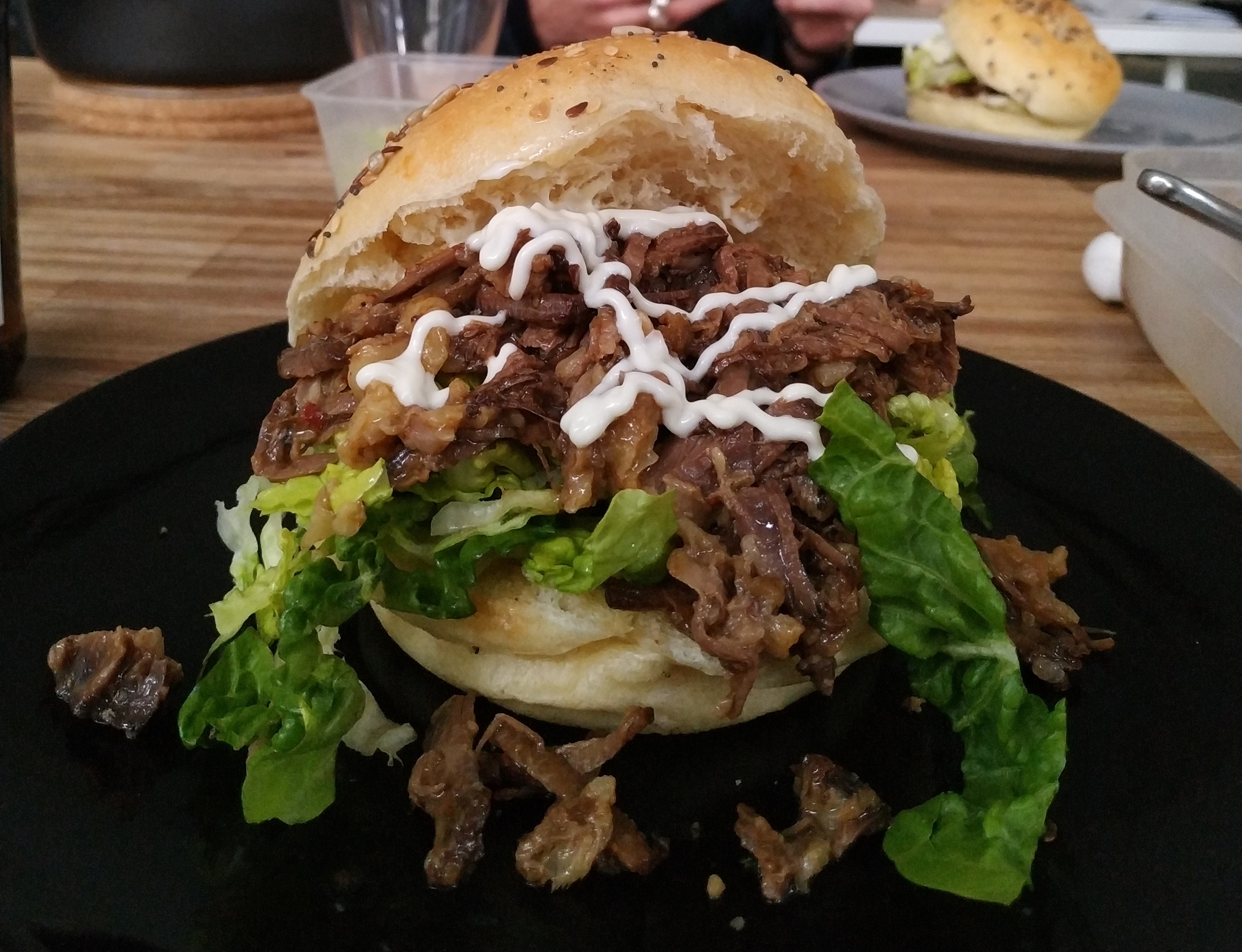
Shredded beef in a bun with lettuce and mayonnaise

== See also ==
- Dried shredded squid
- Ground beef – typically chopped with a meat grinder
- List of beef dishes
- Pulled pork – shredded pork
- Rousong – a dried pork, fish or chicken food that includes pulling the meat fibers apart in its preparation
