= Crispy tadyang ng baka =

Beef dish

In the Philippines, crispy tadyang ng baka is deep-fried beef ribs that is served with a side of soy sauce and vinegar (toyo't suka) or pickled vegetables (atchara). The ribs are regarded as a pulutan, best served with beer. Crispy tadyang is similar to baby back ribs but made of beef and fried instead of grilled.

== See also ==
- List of beef dishes
- List of deep fried foods
