= Pulled pork =

Pork barbecue dish of the Southern United States

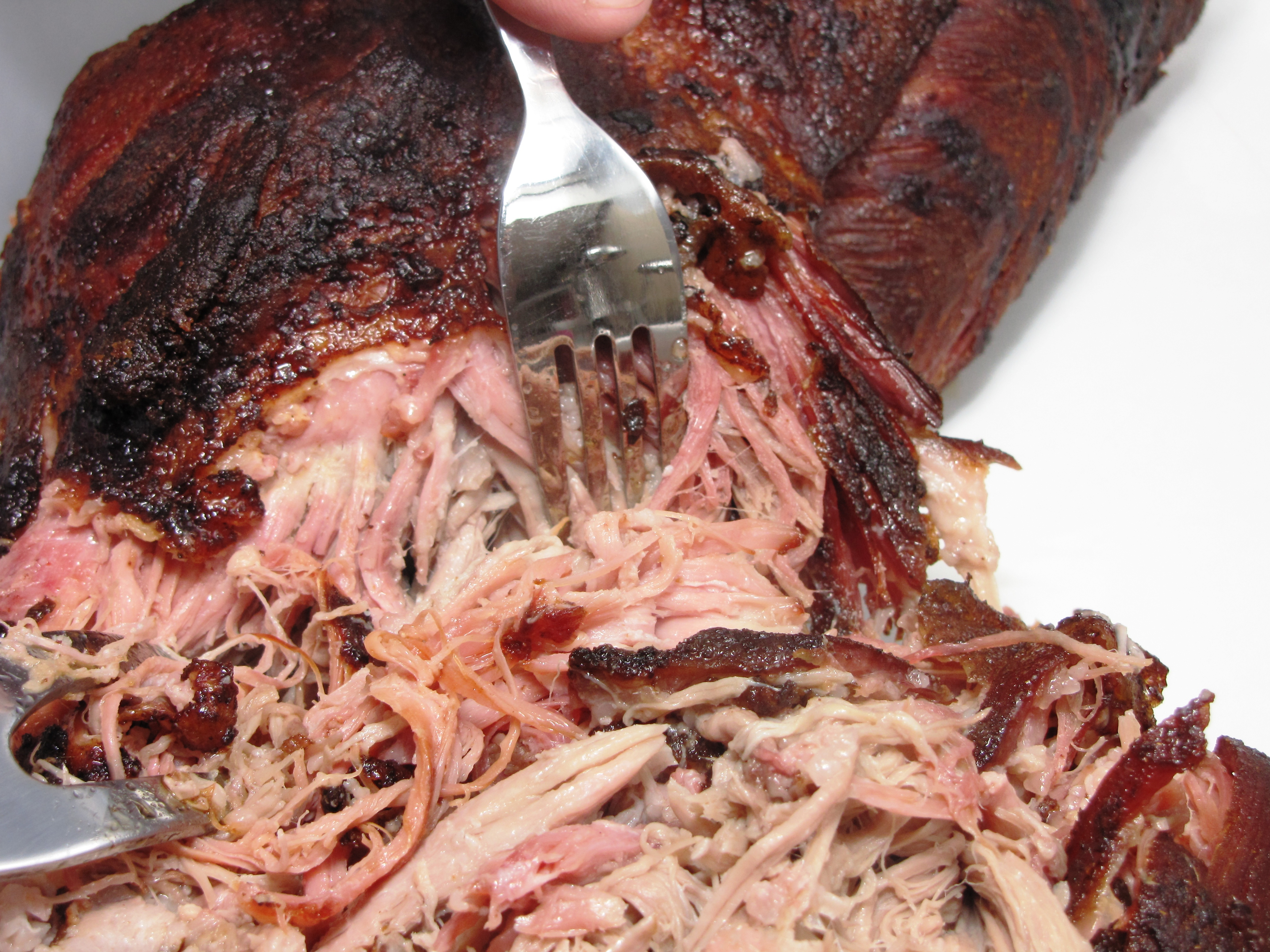
Pork being shredded with a fork

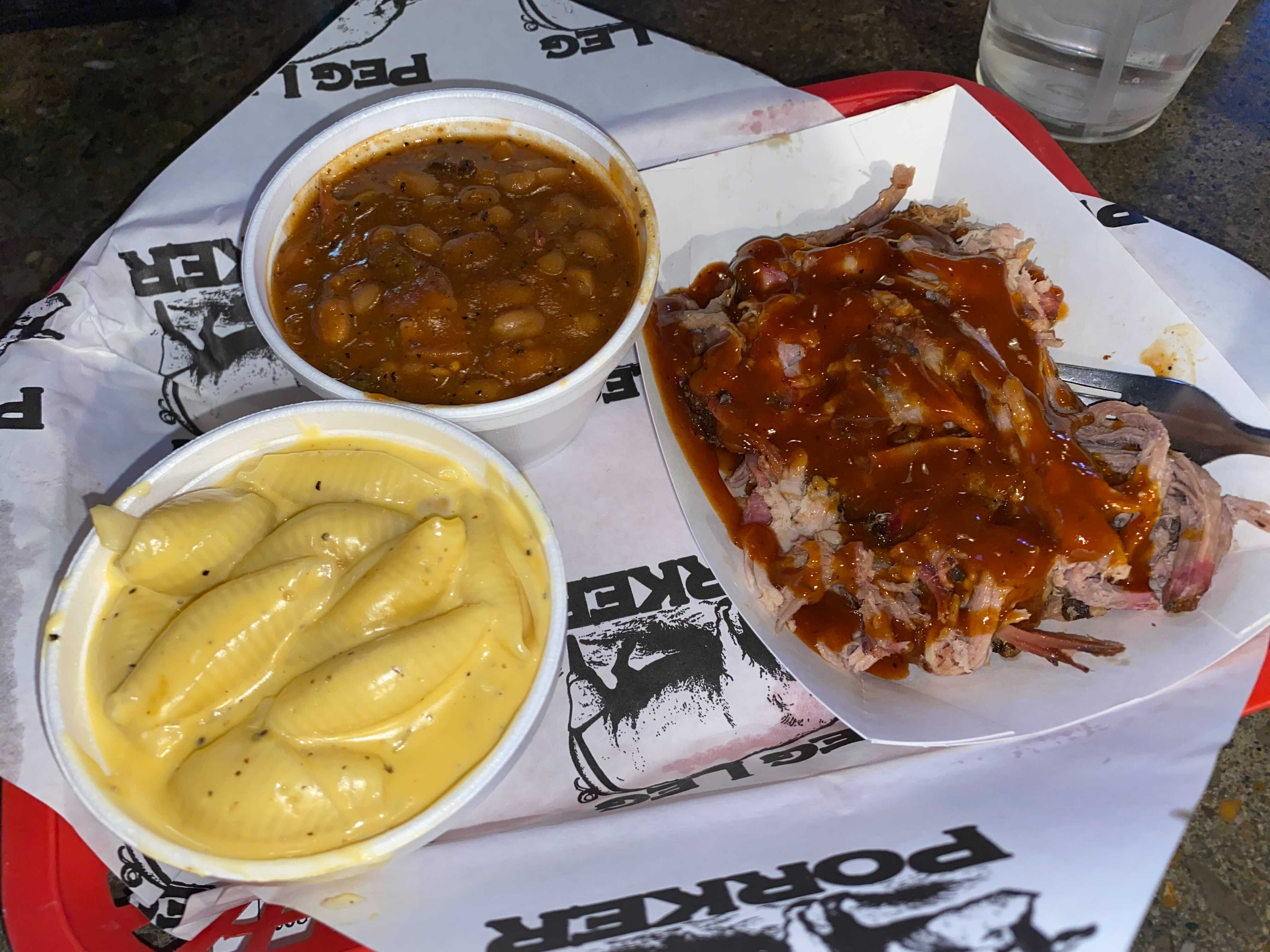
Pulled pork, baked beans, and macaroni and cheese from Peg Leg Porker in Nashville, Tennessee

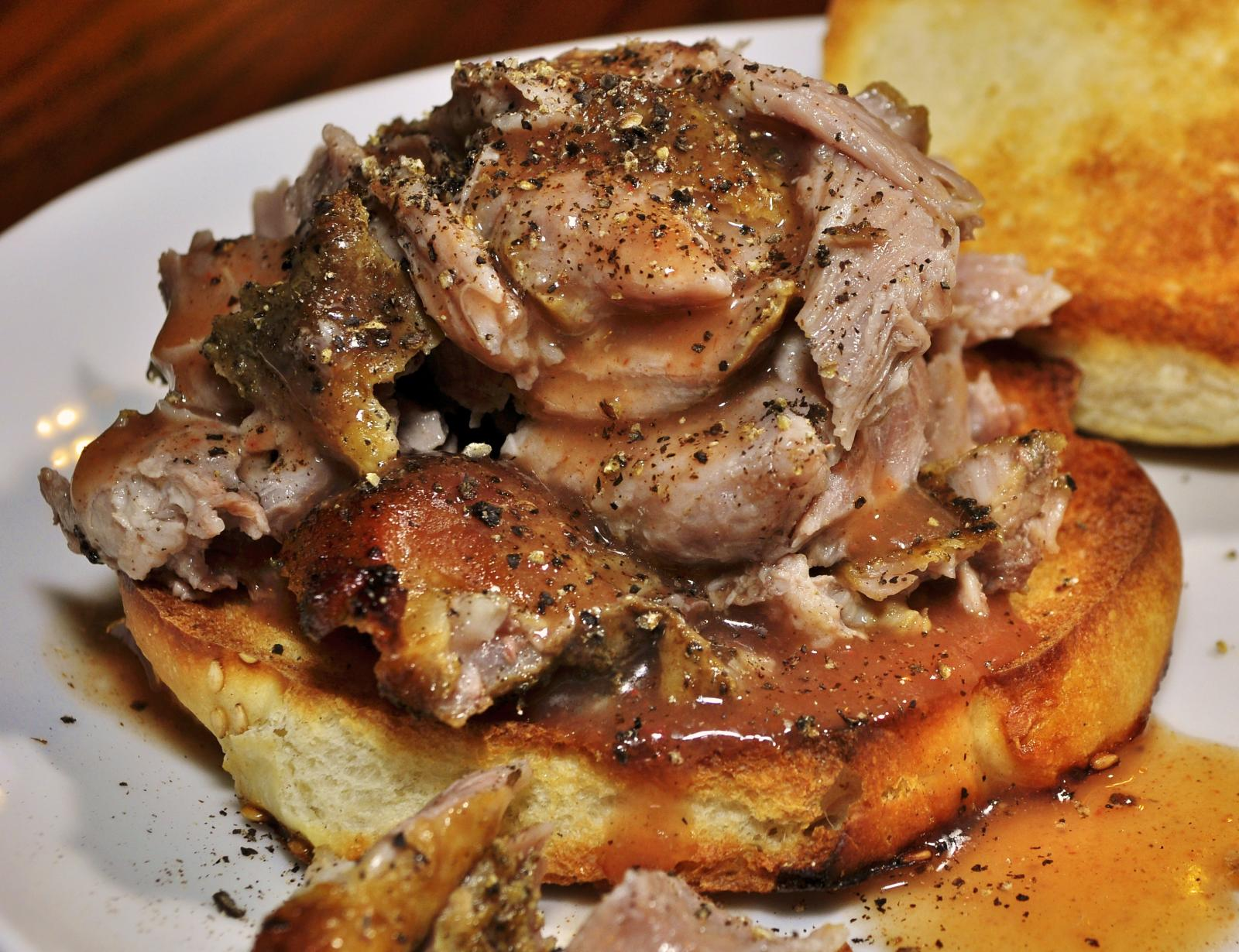
A pulled pork sandwich

Pulled pork is an American barbecue dish, more specifically a dish of the Southern United States, based on shredded barbecued pork shoulder. It is typically slow-smoked over wood (usually outdoors); indoor variations use a slow cooker. The meat is then shredded manually and mixed with a sauce. It may be served on bread as a sandwich, or eaten on its own.

== Preparation ==
Pulled pork, almost always a shoulder cut, is commonly slow-cooked by first applying a dry rub, then smoking over wood. A non-barbecue method uses a slow cooker, a domestic oven, or an electric pressure cooker.

For the meat to 'pull' properly, it must reach an internal temperature of 195 to 205 °F (91 to 96 °C); the smoker temperature can be around 275 °F (135 °C). Cooking time is many hours, often more than 12 hours (though much shorter with electric pressure cookers, typically from 60 to 90 minutes).

In rural areas across the United States, either a pig roast/whole hog barbecue, mixed cuts of the pig/hog, or the shoulder cut (Boston butt) alone are commonly used, and the pork is then shredded before being served with or without a vinegar-based sauce. Before cooking, it is common to soak the meat in brine; this process provides the extra moisture needed for a long, slow cooking process.

== See also ==
- Carnitas, a similar preparation in Mexican cuisine
- Shredded beef – Preparation of beef that features in various cuisines
