= Carne de Ávila =

Spanish protected geographic designation for beef

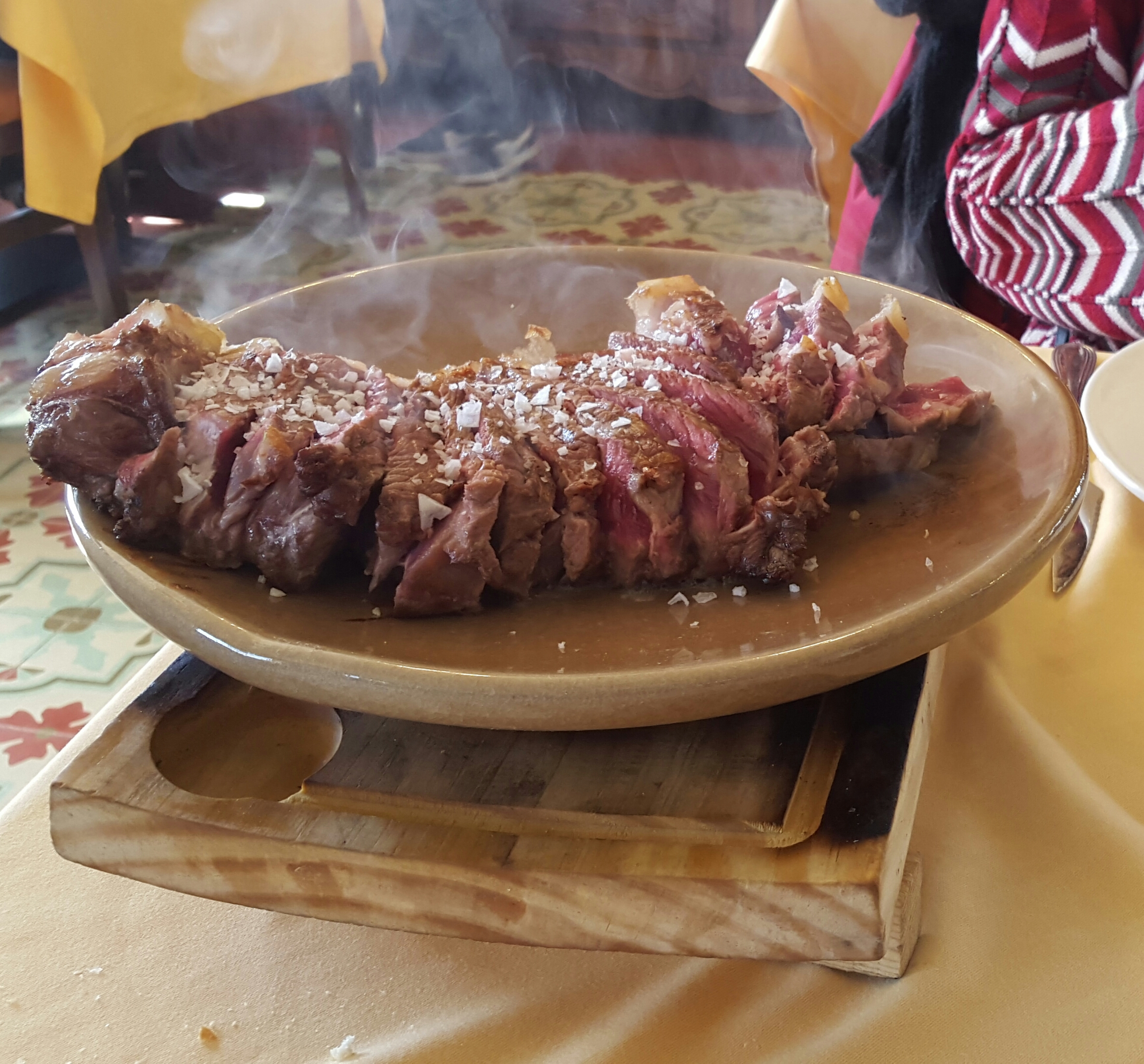
Meat of Ávila

Carne de Ávila (beef from Avila) is a protected geographic designation for beef originating from the Province of Ávila in Spain. The designation was approved in 1988.

== Overview ==
Carne de Ávila is produced exclusively from livestock of the Avileña-Black Iberian breed found throughout the region of Castile and León. The regulatory board is headquartered in the city of Ávila.

The Avileña-Black Iberian breed is an evolved specimen from the serrana race, crossed with other breeds of the region, which has resulted in a small population of animals of uniform black coat, although some individuals exhibit degradation on the skin tone.

Carne de Ávila is the source of the original raw t-bone, a typical dish of the Province of Ávila.

== See also ==
- List of beef dishes
