= Pique macho =

Bolivian beef dish

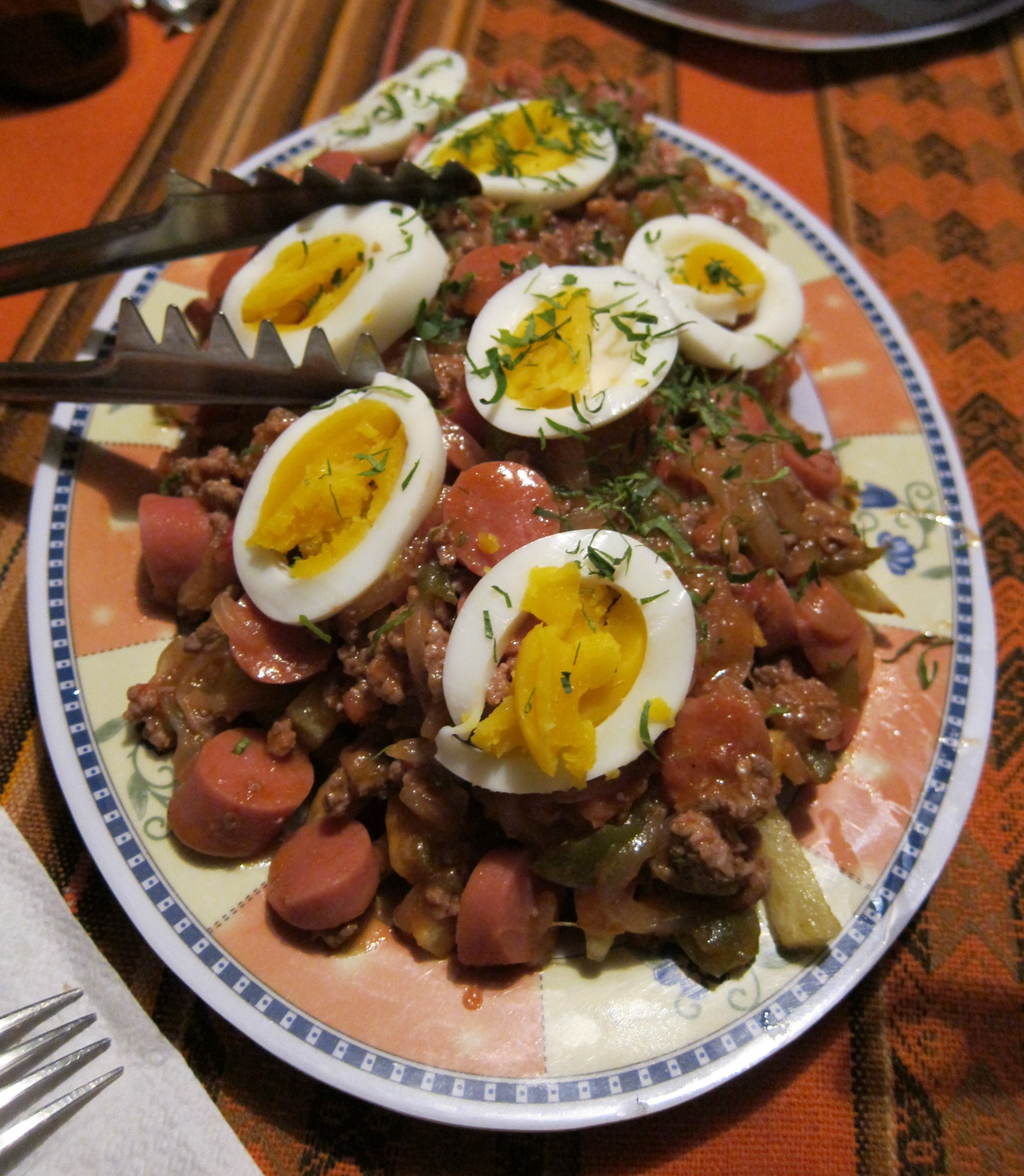
- Pique macho consisting of beef, sausage, and french fry-cut potatoes. Added to the mixture are onions, Capsicum pubescens (locoto), boiled egg, mustard, mayonnaise, and ketchup
- Alternative names: pique a lo macho
- Type: Beef dish
- Place of origin: Bolivia
- Region or state: Cochabamba
- Created by: Honorato Quiñones Andia and Evangelina Rojas Vargas
- Main ingredients: Beef, sausage, red onion, green pepper, tomato, french fries, mustard, mayonnaise, and ketchup

Pique macho (also referred to as pique a lo macho) is a Bolivian dish consisting of beef, sausage, red onion, green pepper, tomato, french fries, mustard, mayonnaise, and ketchup that originated from the region of Cochabamba Department. It is one of the country's most popular dishes, with regional variations existing throughout the country. Depending on the region it is cooked, boiled egg may also be included.

Smaller portions are simply called pique; pique macho is a huge portion and traditionally spicy because of the pimentón (paprika). Urban legend suggests that this is because you are macho if you can finish one by yourself, though most diners opt to share the dish among a pair or a group.

== Origin and background ==
The dish has its origin in the region of Cochabamba in Bolivia when, in the mid-1970s, a couple of chefs, Honorato Quiñones Andia and his wife Evangelina Rojas Vargas, had the bright idea of combining savoury meat with spicy sauce and serving it sopping wet atop french fries. The couple originated from the town of Torotoro in Charcas Province of the Potosí Department before starting their restaurant business in Cochabamba after their marriage in 1969.

A story describes that one night when a group of workers from a nearby building, mainly pilots, technicians, and stewardesses of Lloyd Aéreo Boliviano, met at their restaurant, El Prado, the workers were drunk and hungry. The owner of the restaurant said they were already closing at the time and had nothing, but the group of workers insisted that they would eat anything remaining. The owner proceeded to chop what she had left of the ingredients that constitute the pique macho and served them really spicy to help with their drunkenness. She then said, "Piquen" si son "machos" (Eat it if you think you're man enough), and soon, when the news spread, other guests began to ask for the same dish, and many, when tasting it, agreed to say, "This is a picado for machos", referring to how hot the dish was. The dish subsequently became high in demand, and both the couple began to include it in the restaurant's main menu and named it "pique a lo macho".

Since then, the dish had spread from Cochabamba to major Bolivian cities of La Paz and Santa Cruz, which prompted the couple to transfer the food venture to a larger one in 1978; where it was named Quinta Miraflores Restaurant. In 2004, the Cochabamba Chamber of Restaurant and Related Fields Businessmen, together with the local tourism board, awarded the couple the Alejo Calatayud Order and Social Tradition Merit, recognising their dish as a cultural icon of the region of Cochabamba. Evangelina Rojas Vargas died on 10 July 2006, and her husband, Honorato Quiñones Andia, followed her about seven months later in early 2007. Their restaurant continues to operate to the present, serving the original recipe and maintaining their dish's legacy.

== Preparation ==
The dish is an iconic Bolivian dish that combines beef, sausages, french fries or yuca frita (yuca fries), onions, green pepper, tomatoes, and locoto peppers, with the key preparation involving the meat marination with garlic, cumin, and soy sauce; potatoes frying; and the mixture of ingredients in a pan to blend the flavours before serving with a hard-boiled egg. The potatoes, which are a core ingredient in the dish, are peeled and cut into thick-sized fries or wedges before being fried in hot vegetable or avocado oil until they become golden and crispy, a process that usually takes from 10 to around 15 minutes depending on batch size, after which they are drained on paper towels to remove excess oil.

== Variation and adaptations ==
Throughout Bolivia, variety of local variations had existed while maintaining the dish original structure of beef, fries, and its spicy elements. Highland Bolivians often use Ají sauce in food preparation, including for the dish. In the city of La Paz for example, the dish is often served with Llajua sauce and el queso del altiplano (the cheese from the highlands), a fresh highland cheese, alongside traditional chorizo and beef. The dish has also been adapted by Bolivian diaspora communities in different regions with meat substitutions like chicken and milder bell peppers instead of Capsicum pubescens (locotos) to meet regional ingredient availability. Vegetarian substitute versions emerged within urban areas by replacing the meats with either mushrooms or Asian seitan or tofu, while preserving the original layered form of fries, vegetables, and sauces. In the city of Los Angeles in the United States, Hispanic community cuisine within the area is known for its distinctive spicy flavour, and the dish has become the favourite among some Hollywood celebrities, with actor Edward James Olmos once mentioning the dish when he portrayed the famous Bolivian math teacher Jaime Escalante in the 1988 film Stand and Deliver.

== See also ==
- List of beef dishes
