= Posta sudada =

Traditional Colombian meat dish

Posta sudada is a traditional Colombian cuisine meat dish, particularly of Antioqueña. Described in the Miami Herald as sliced pot roast slow-cooked in a Creole-style sauce it is served at Miami's restaurant Los Guaduales, a restaurant specializing in fare from Medellín, Colombia.
