= Skomakarlåda =

Swedish meat dish

- Place of origin: Sweden
- Main ingredients: Mashed potatoes, beef, gravy, bacon, leeks

Skomakarlåda is a traditional Swedish meat dish. It is composed of a slice of pan-fried steak, served with gravy and mashed potatoes, and typically garnished with diced bacon and chopped pieces of leek, which are put on the steak.

The term Skomakarlåda translates as shoemaker's box. Its name derives from the similarity of the shape of the slice of steak to that of the sole of a shoe.

== See also ==
- List of steak dishes
