= Rambak petis =

Javanese snack food

- Course: Hors d'oeuvre or snack
- Place of origin: Indonesia
- Region or state: Central Java, East Java, Yogyakarta
- Main ingredients: Cow hide, petis

Rambak petis is a Javanese snack food, made of deep fried cow hide served with petis, a sauce made from sweet soya sauce and fermented prawn paste. It is traditionally served as an appetizer.

== See also ==
- List of deep fried foods
