= Millionbøf =

Danish beef dish

Millionbøf (translating literally to “million beef”) is a Danish beef dish that is commonly served with potatoes, pasta or rice. The name comes from the fact that the meat is broken up into many small pieces when stir fried.

The dish may be seasoned as needed, and more ingredients can be added, such as onions, pearl onions, strips of pepper or paprika. It can also be made in a pot with onions, sweet pepper, corn and mashed tomatoes.
