= Fillet of Beef Prince Albert =

Foie gras wrapped in pounded beef tenderloin wrapped in bacon

- Beef Cuts
- Type: Tenderloin cut of beef

Prince Albert Fillet of Beef is a method of preparing a fillet of beef which was named in honour of the husband of Queen Victoria.

It seems to be a part of classic British cuisine and while by no means common, it appears on menus in some British hotels and restaurants. Essentially, it is a pounded beef fillet, rolled around a filling of pate de foie gras, then wrapped with bacon and braised in spiked stock.
