= List of rolled foods =

This is a list of rolled foods—foods that are rolled up. While a food may have roll in the name this does not necessarily indicate that it is a rolled food. Many types of rolled foods exist, including those in the forms of dishes, prepared foods, snacks and candies.

== Rolled foods ==
Name	Image	Origin	Description
Arctic roll		United Kingdom	A British dessert made of vanilla ice cream wrapped in a thin layer of sponge cake to form a roll, with a layer of raspberry flavoured sauce between the sponge and the ice cream.
Arem-arem		Indonesia	An Indonesian food made of rice filled with spicy meat mix or spicy vegetables mix wrapped in thin plain omelette then wrapped in banana leaves.
Bánh cuốn (literally "rolled cake")		Northern Vietnam	A dish made from a thin, wide sheet of fermented steamed batter of rice filled with seasoned ground pork, minced wood ear mushroom, and minced shallots.
Black sesame roll			A refrigerated dim sum dessert found in Hong Kong and some overseas Chinatowns. It is sweet, with a smooth and soft texture.
Braciolone		Italy, Sicily, and Louisiana	An Italian roulade meat dish consisting of braised beef, veal or pork that is filled with cheese, salami, hard-boiled eggs and breadcrumbs and then rolled. It has been described as a large-sized braciola-style dish. Braciolone is also a dish in Sicilian cuisine and the cuisine of the U.S. state of Louisiana.
Burrito			A type of Mexican food that consists of a wheat flour tortilla wrapped or folded into a cylindrical shape and folded to completely enclose a variety of fillings, toppings and sauses.
Cabbage roll			A dish consisting of cooked cabbage leaves wrapped around a variety of fillings. It is common to the ethnic cuisines of the Balkans, as well as other parts of Europe such as Finland and Sweden, and the Middle East.
Cheese roll			A snack food similar to Welsh rarebit, but created by covering a slice of bread in a prepared filling consisting mainly of grated or sliced cheese, and then rolling it into a tube shape before toasting.
Chelsea bun			A bun is made of a rich yeast dough flavoured with lemon peel, cinnamon or mixed spice. The dough is rolled out, spread with a mixture of currants, brown sugar and butter, formed into a square-sided log, then cut into slices. The process of making this bun is very similar to that involved in producing the cinnamon roll.
Chiko Roll		Australia	An Australian savoury snack, inspired by the Chinese egg roll and spring rolls. It was designed to be easily eaten on the move without a plate or cutlery. The Chiko roll consists of celery, cabbage, barley, carrot, corn, onion, green beans, and spices in a tube of egg, flour and dough which is then deep-fried.
Chimichanga			A deep-fried burrito that is popular in Southwestern U.S. cuisine, Tex-Mex cuisine, and the Mexican states of Sinaloa and Sonora. The dish is typically prepared by filling a flour tortilla with a wide range of ingredients, most commonly rice, cheese, machaca, carne adobada, or shredded chicken, and folding it into a rectangular package.
Cinnamon roll			A sweet roll served commonly in Northern Europe and North America. Cinnamon rolls typically consist of a rolled sheet of yeast-leavened dough onto which a cinnamon and sugar mixture (and raisins or chopped grapes in some cases) is sprinkled over a thin coat of butter.
Crescent rolls (or Croissant)			A croissant is a crescent-shaped puff pastry. Pillsbury Crescents is a type of premade puff pastry dough made by The Pillsbury Company and invented in the United States in the 1960s. Crescent rolls also refers to the material that comprises Poppin' Fresh, the Pillsbury Doughboy.
Dosa (food)		South India	A rice and bean batter fried into a thin pancake, then rolled and optionally filled (e.g., with spiced steamed potatoes or other vegetables)
Dürüm	Rolled kebab	Turkey	Flatbread made from Yufka or Lavash, wrapped around Döner kebab meats, salad and a joghurt-based sauce. Variations include filling it with Falafel, Çiğ köfte or Halloumi. Most often seen a street-food in Central Europe and Turkey.
Egg roll			A term used for many different foods around the world.
Enchilada			A corn tortilla rolled around a filling and covered with a chili pepper sauce. Enchiladas can be filled with a variety of ingredients, including meat, cheese, beans, potatoes, vegetables, seafood or combinations.
Farsu magru		Sicily	Farsu magru, also spelled as farsumagru, and also referred to as farsumauru, falsomagro and falsumagru, is a traditional meat roll dish in Sicilian cuisine that dates to the 13th century. Farsu magru is available in many areas of Sicily, but some only serve it for special occasions. This roast is prepared mainly in rural regions in the interior of the island. Farsu magru means "false lean", which has been attributed to the amounts of meat used in the dish, and also to the lean, low-fat nature of the meats typically used.
Fig Roll		Ancient Egypt	The fig roll or fig bar is a cake consisting of a sweet roll filled with fig paste in and around the middle.
Fruit by the Foot		United States	A fruit snack made by General Mills (GM) in the brand line Betty Crocker.
Fruit Roll-Ups		United States	A brand of fruit snack that debuted in grocery stores across America in 1983. The snack is a flat, pectin-based fruit-flavored snack.
Gỏi Cuốn		Vietnam	A dish in Vietnamese cuisine traditionally consisting of pork, prawn, vegetables, bún (rice vermicelli), and other ingredients wrapped in Vietnamese bánh tráng (commonly known as rice paper).
Kati roll		Kolkata, India	A street-food, its original form was a kati kabab enclosed in a paratha, but over the years many variants have evolved all of which now go under the generic name of Kati Roll. Today, pretty much any filling rolled up in any kind of Indian flatbread is called a kati roll. The Kati Roll is said to have started its life from the Nizam Restaurant in Kolkata, a popular eatery founded in 1932 that sold kebabs and parathas and other Mughlai food in the heart of Kolkata.
Khao phan		Vietnam	Khao phan khai muan (Thai: ข้าวพันไข่ม้วน): Rolled khao phan with egg. Khao phan is somewhat similar to the northern Lao dish called nem khao and the northern Vietnamese dish called banh cuon. In Thailand this dish is only found in Uttaradit province.
Lahmacun	Wrapped Lahmacun	Turkey, Armenia	Middle Eastern flatbread topped with minced meat (most commonly beef or lamb), minced vegetables, and herbs including onions, garlic, tomatoes, red peppers, and parsley, flavored with spices such as chili pepper and paprika, then baked. Lahmacun is often wrapped around vegetables, including pickles, tomatoes, peppers, onions, lettuce, parsley, and roasted eggplant.
Lemper		Indonesia	Lemper is made of sticky rice filled with sweet meat mixture or meat floss then rolled and wrapped with banana leaves.
Madatha Kaja (Tapeswaram Kaja)		Andhra Pradesh (India)	Originating from Tapeshwaram, it features a layered structure, made by rolling refined wheat flour-and-ghee dough into thin sheets, folding them into diamond shapes, and cutting them into smaller pieces before frying and soaking them in sugar syrup
Makizushi		Japan	Various types of rolled sushi.
Minnesota sushi		Midwestern United States	Slice of ham covered in cream cheese, rolled around a pickle spear, and cut into bite-size pieces. Usually consumed as a cold appetizer.
Negimaki		Japan	Broiled strips of beef marinated in teriyaki sauce and rolled with scallions (negi).
Nut roll			A pastry consisting of a sweet yeast dough (usually using milk) that is rolled out very thin, spread with a nut paste made from ground nuts and a sweetener like honey, then rolled up into a log shape.
Palatschinke		Greco-Roman world	A thin crêpe-like variety of pancake of Greco-Roman origin.
Pancetta arrotolata		Italy	Rolled and cured bacon from Italy.
Patishapta		West Bengal (India), Bangladesh	A light crêpe made out of rice flour, semolina also known as sooji, banana, milk and sugar batter and filled with khoa or coconut and jaggery mixture. It is one of the delicacies that comes under the umbrella term pitha, used to describe a variety of items made of rice flour and date juice and is symbolic to the rice-harvest festival of Bengal known as Poush Parbon during Makar Sankranti.
Pigs in blankets			Pigs in blankets, kilted sausages or kilted soldiers is a dish served in the United Kingdom and Ireland consisting of small sausages (usually chipolatas) wrapped in bacon. In the United States, pigs in a blanket are small hot dogs or other sausages individually wrapped in pastry. It is commonly served as an appetizer.
Popiah			A Fujian/Chaozhou-style fresh spring roll common in Taiwan, Singapore, Malaysia, Thailand and Burma/Myanmar, where it is called kawpyan.
Poppy seed roll		Various parts of Europe	Pastry of sweet yeast bread rolled around a dense filling of poppy seed.
Rice noodle roll		Southern China, Hong Kong	A Cantonese dish from Southern China and Hong Kong, commonly served as a variety of dim sum. It is a thin roll made from a wide strip of shahe fen (rice noodles), filled with shrimp, pork, beef, vegetables, or other ingredients.
Risoles		Indonesia	This filling snack is a thin pancake wrapped around savory fillings: sohun, vegetable mixture; some also add smoked beef, mayonnaise, or egg. It is then covered in egg and panko then fried.
Rolex (food)		Uganda	Rolled chapati bread with an egg and vegetables
Rollmops		Northern Europe	Pickled herring fillets, rolled into a cylindrical shape, often around a savoury filling.
Roulade		France	A dish of filled rolled meat or pastry, which can be savory or sweet. Swiss roll is an example of a sweet roulade. Traditionally found in various European cuisines, the term roulade originates from the French word rouler, meaning 'to roll'. However, the term may be used in its generic sense to describe any filled rolled dish, such as those found in Makizushi.
Rugelach		Poland, Israel	A filled baked confection originating in the Jewish communities of Poland. Often filled with chocolate.
Rullepølse		Scandinavia	A piece of pork belly – variants use beef flank or lamb – is flattened out and is spread with herbs and seasoning, chopped onions, and in some variants, parsley. It is then rolled up and placed in a brine for a number of days, before being boiled, placed in a special press, cooled, and sliced thinly.
Sarma		Ottoman Empire and diaspora	Grape vine leaves or leafy greens stuffed with rice or other fillings.
Sausage roll			A type of savoury pastry, the basic composition of a sausage roll is generally a sheet or sheets of puff pastry formed into tubes around sausage meat and glazed with egg or milk before being baked.
Shawarma (in lavash)		Middle Eastern	A popular street food made with spiced, grilled meat – traditionally lamb or mutton, thinly sliced and grilled on a vertical rotisserie – rolled in thin lavash bread, often with vegetables and sauces.
Sigara böreği			Pastry, rolled into a slim cylinder (often with a cheese filling), and fried.
Spring roll			A large variety of filled, rolled appetizers. The name is a literal translation of the Chinese chūn juǎn (Chinese: 春卷; lit. 'spring roll'') found in East Asian and Southeast Asian cuisine.
Stir-fried Ice Cream		Thailand	Stir-fried ice cream is also known as rolled ice cream or ice cream rolls. It is a sweetened frozen dessert that is made using milk, cream, and sugars, as well as other added ingredients to improve the flavor. It originated in Thailand as a popular street food that then spread to neighboring countries, and eventually, the United States.
Stromboli		United States	Stromboli is a type of baked turnover filled with various Italian cheeses and usually cured meats or vegetables.
Swiss roll			A type of sponge cake roll in which a thin cake layer is made of flour, eggs, and sugar and baked in a very shallow rectangular baking pan, upon which the cake is spread with jam or buttercream, rolled up, and served in round cross-sectional slices.
Taquito		Mexico	Spanish for 'small taco', it is a Mexican dish most often consisting of a small rolled-up tortilla and some type of filling.
Tofu skin roll			A dim sum dish with fillings that range from pork with vegetable, to fish or beef. It can be found in Hong Kong and among overseas Chinese restaurants.

== See also ==
Media related to Rolls (food) at Wikimedia Commons

- List of dumplings
- List of stuffed dishes
- Roll (disambiguation)
