= Rinderroulade =

Meat dish

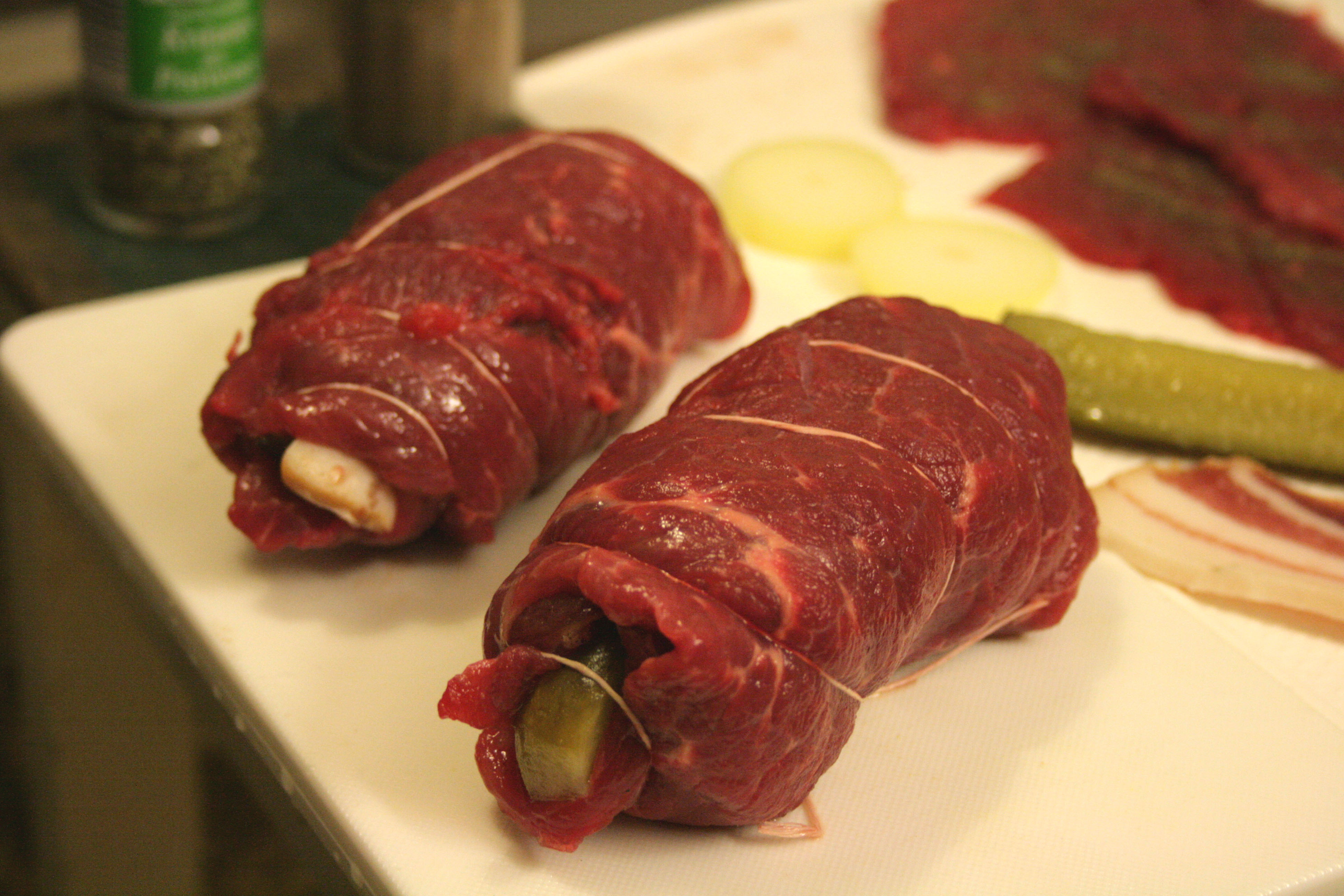
Uncooked Rouladen

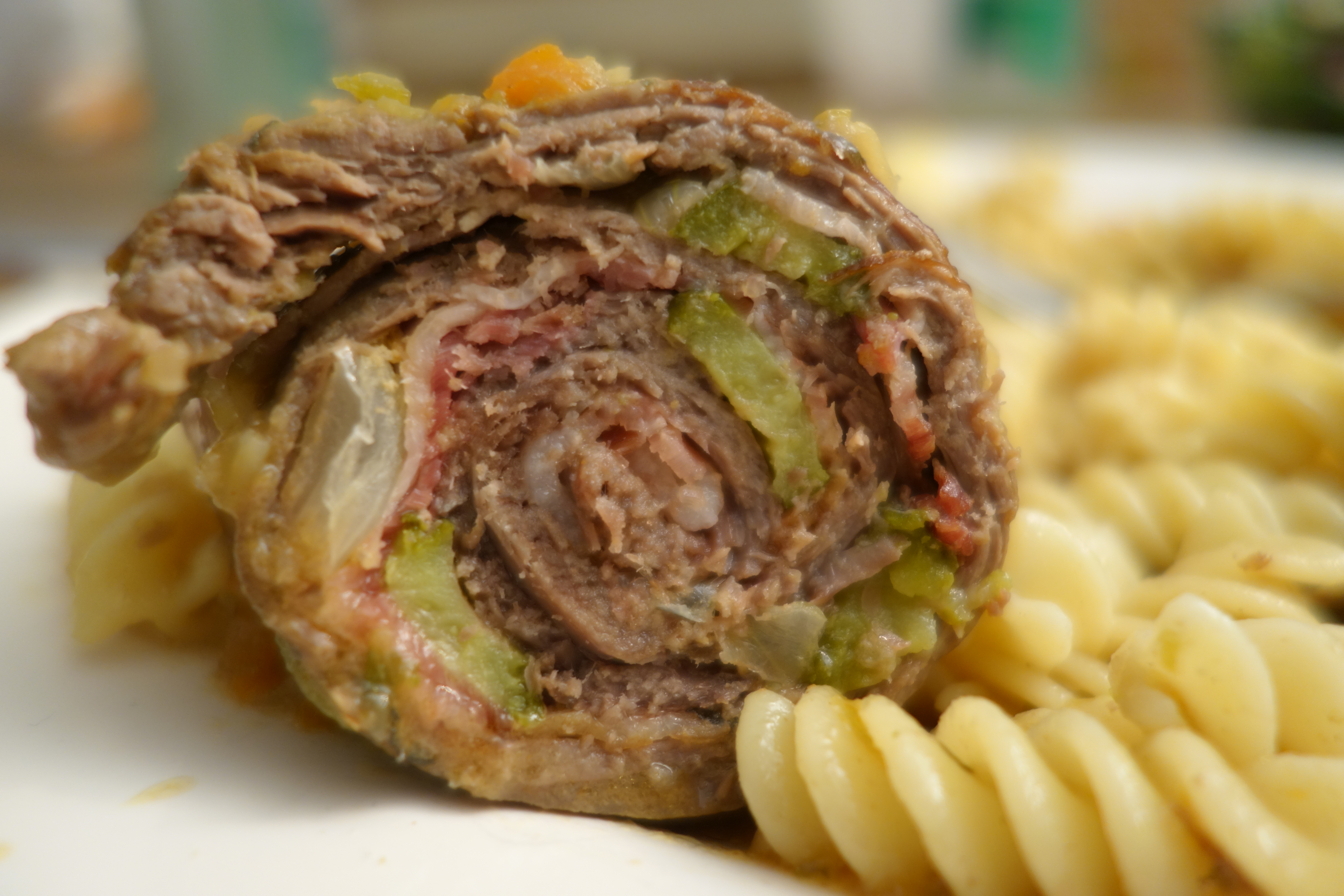
Sliced beef roulade filled with bacon, onion and pickled cucumber. The carrot piece on top belongs to the broth, which is used as gravy for the complements.

Rinderrouladen (German: [ˈʁɪndɐʁuˌlaːdn̩]; plural, singular Rinderroulade (German: [ˈʁɪndɐʁuˌlaːdə])) are a German meat dish, usually consisting of bacon, onions, mustard and pickles wrapped in thinly sliced beef which is then cooked. The dish is also considered traditional in the Upper Silesia region of Poland, where it is known as rolada śląska (Silesian roulade; Silesian: Sylezyjsko ruleta) and in the Czech Republic, where it is known as španělský ptáček (Spanish bird). In Britain, the equivalent dish is widely referred to as beef olives.

Beef or veal is typically used, though some food scholars tend to believe that the original version was probably venison or pork, and pork is still popular in some areas. Beef rouladen, as they are known today, has gained popularity over the past century. The cut is usually topside beef or silverside since this is the cheaper cut. The meat is cut into large, thin slices.

The filling is a mixture of smoked fatback, chopped onions and chopped pickles (gherkins), which is at times varied by adding minced meat or sausage meat. The mixture varies from region to region. Rouladen are traditionally served for dinner. Red wine is often used for the gravy.

== Serving ==
Rinderrouladen are usually served with either Kartoffelklösse or mashed potatoes and braised red cabbage. Roasted winter vegetables are another common side dish. The gravy is an absolute necessity and is made with a combination of the drippings, a packet of natural gravy mix and red wine. Spätzle are a good complement to the dish since they soak up the gravy well.

Originally considered a dish for common people, it is today enjoyed by many as a festive dish, especially during the Christmas season.

== See also ==
- Roulade – filled rolled meat or pastry in general
- Braciole
- Zrazy
- List of beef dishes
- List of stuffed dishes
