= Paupiette =

French savoury dish

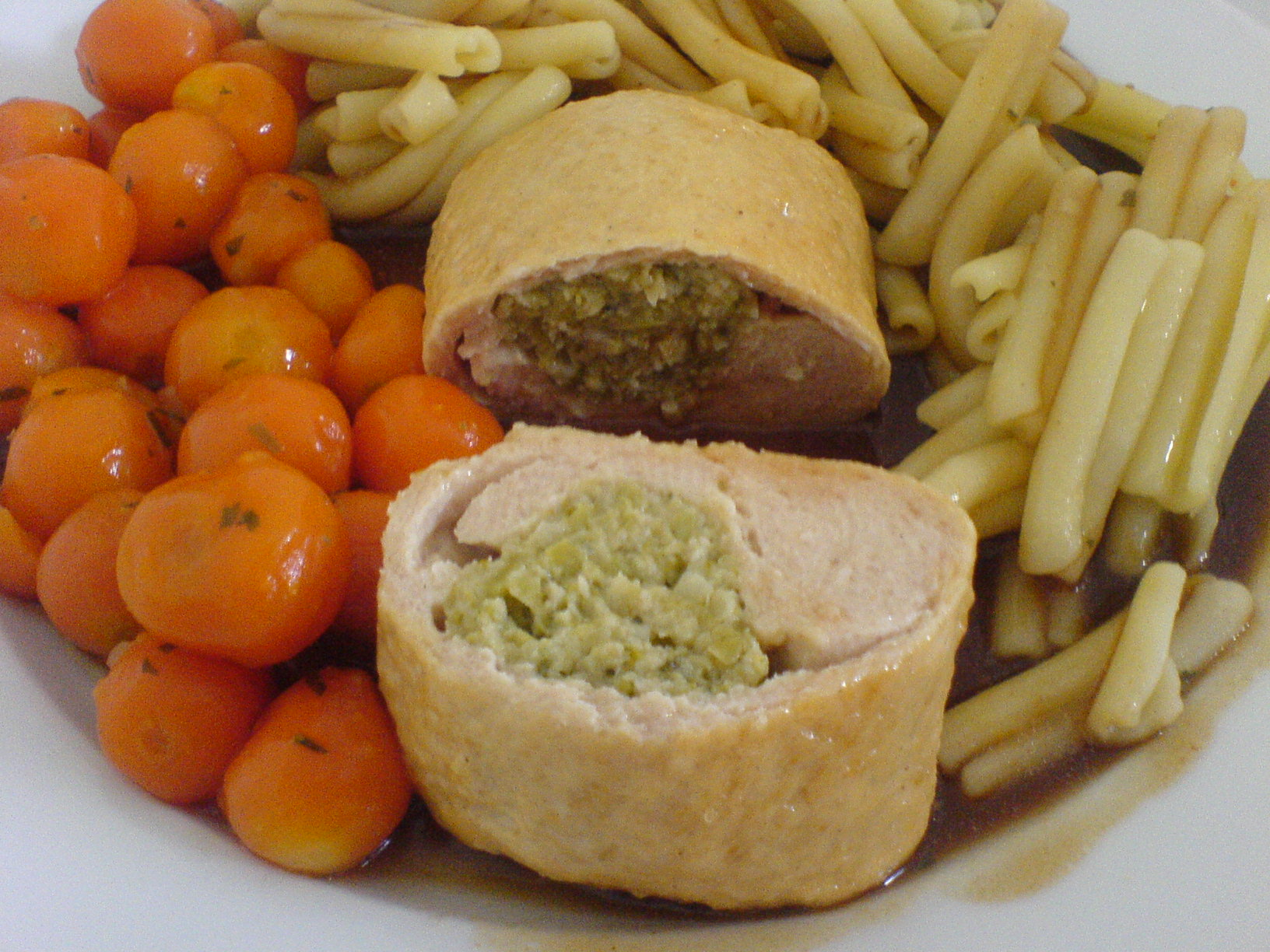
A paupiette

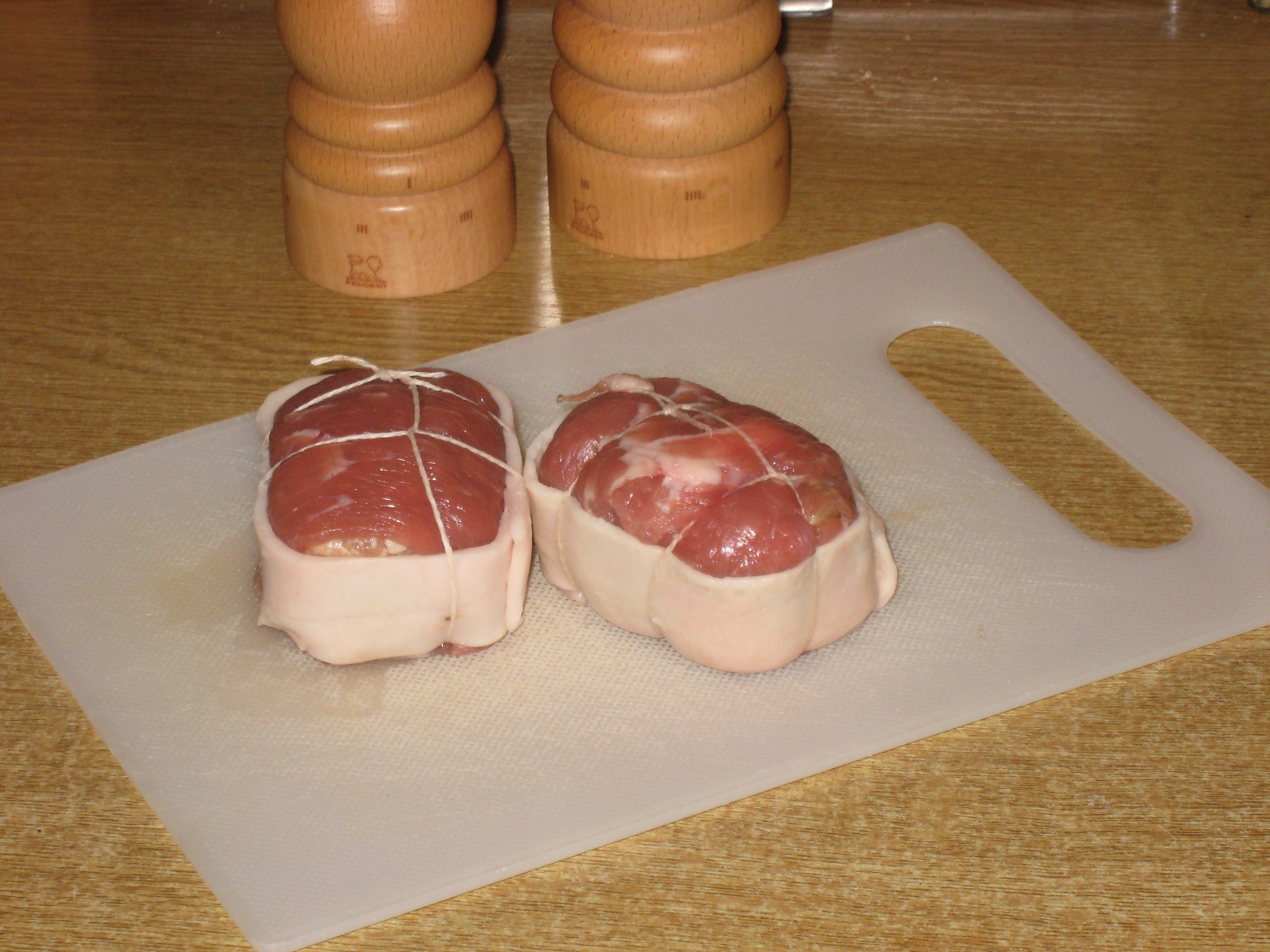
Raw veal paupiettes

A 'paupiette' is a type of savory roulade sometimes called a braciole.

There are several variants, The dish may be a piece of meat, beaten thin, and rolled with a savory stuffing such as forcemeat. It is often featured in recipes from Normandy. It is often fried or braised, or baked in wine or stock. Paupiettes are very popular in France, being sold ready-prepared in supermarkets and butchers. Paupiettes can be made with various items such as chicken, beef, lamb, fish, veal, cabbage, turkey escalopes, or slices of calves' sweetbreads.

Another variant of the classic French fish dish include using a thin slice of fish (tuna, sole, whiting, or even anchovy) which is stuffed, rolled and secured with string before cooking in a stock.

A synonym of paupiette is oiseau sans tête ("headless bird"). In British cuisine, a paupiette of beef is called a beef olive, where olive is a corruption of Old French alou (modern alouette), "lark."

== Variants ==
Paupiettes de Volaille Florentine, where the stuffing is spinach and prosciutto and rice.

Les paupiettes d'agneau à la créole (English.Paupiettes of lamb à la créole), where the stuffing is lamb or mutton forcemeat with onions and peppers.

Paupiettes de dinde à la crécy, is made with turkey, where the stuffing is a pork forcemeat mixed with a dry mushroom duxelle, chopped parsley and bound with eggs.

== See also ==
- Braciolone
