= Apeswari sabha =

Apeswari sabha is a festival organised to worship "Apeswari aai" (a form of kechai-khati goddess). It began in the plains of Assam, with the intention of appeasing the fairies or deities thought to be the causes of different illnesses.

== Rituals ==
In this ritual, the house is first clean thoroughly and all the used clothes are washed. Then, some girls, as well as old women from the village, are called to the household. They are named as Gopinis and are made to sit in a circle in the courtyard. After that, the family brings in the offerings which include rice-powder (pitha-guri), unpasteurised milk (ewa gakhir) and bananas. Then, at the front of the women, a sieve (Saloni/Dala) is placed on top of which the offerings are arranged on a banana leaf (agoli kolpat) and a white cloth. Next, earthen lamps (saki) are lit and the area is decorated with flowers and betel nuts.

The Gopinis then recite prayers (Apeswari naam) to the goddess so as to bless the household especially the child. The family is asked to come and pray to the goddess and the Gopinis bless the child/infant. After this is over, a set of offering is separated for the goddess and offered to her at the backyard of the house or in an open field. The rest is given to the Gopinis as offerings for their service. This ritual is also found among the Deoris and Miris. They call the deity as Apeswari or Yoi Midi.
