= Minnesota sushi =

Appetizer from the Midwestern United States

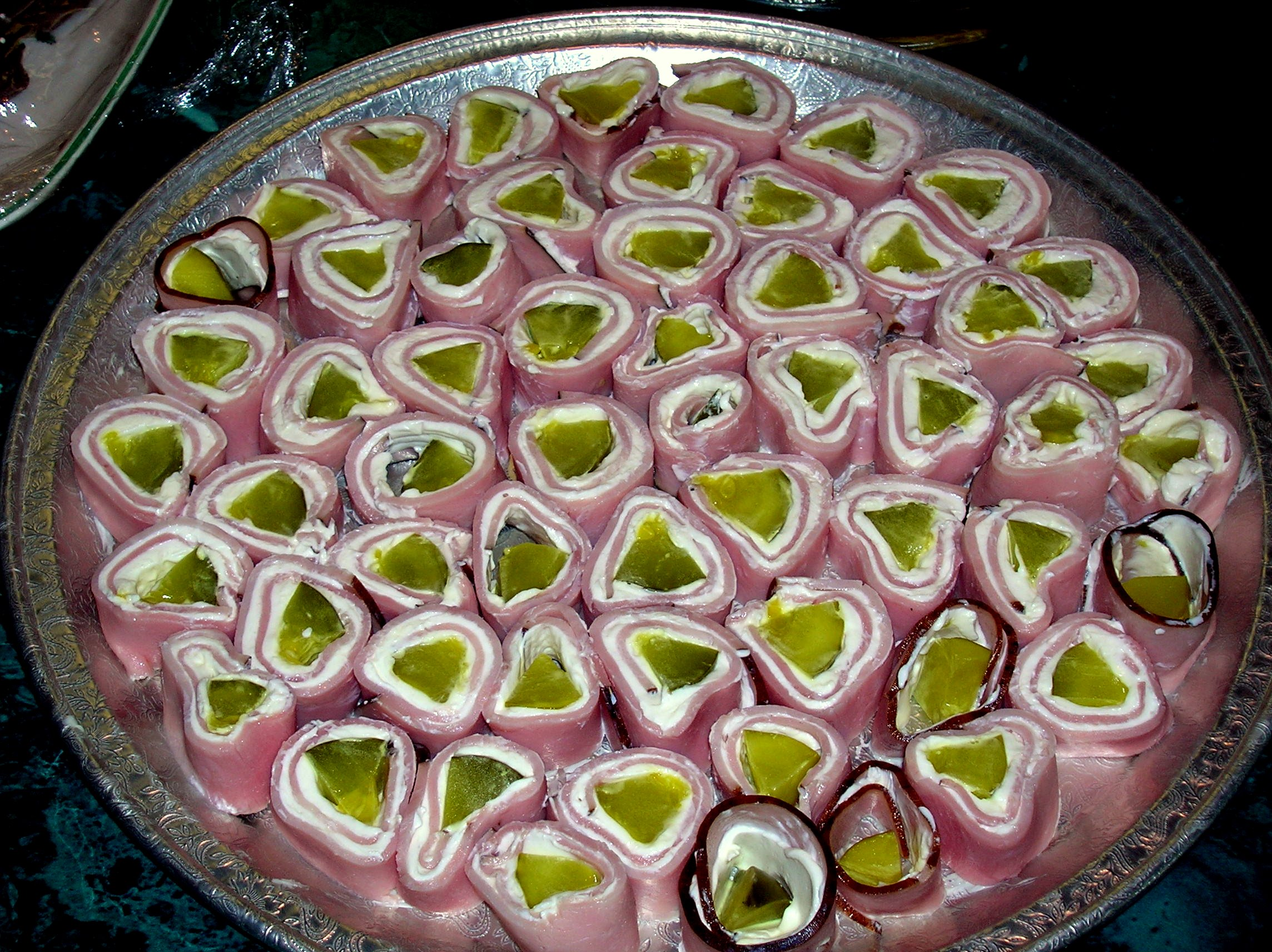
- Tray of Minnesota sushi
- Alternative names: Midwest sushi, Pickle wrap, Pickle roll-up, Frog eyes, Pickle dawg, Iowa sushi, Lutheran sushi, Ham and pickle pinwheels, St. Louis sushi
- Type: Roll
- Course: Appetizer
- Region or state: Midwestern United States
- Serving temperature: Cold
- Similar dishes: Rinderroulade

Minnesota sushi is a type of roll that is popular in the Midwestern United States. The dish goes by different names in different regions and is also known as midwest sushi, pickle wrap, pickle roll-up, frog eyes, pickle dawg, Iowa sushi, Lutheran sushi, ham and pickle pinwheels, or St. Louis sushi.

It is made by wrapping a slice of ham, beef, or salami with cream cheese around a pickle, and then slicing it into bite-sized pieces. While the origins of the dish are unclear, some believe that it can be traced to German immigration to the United States.
