= Farsu magru =

Sicilian meat dish

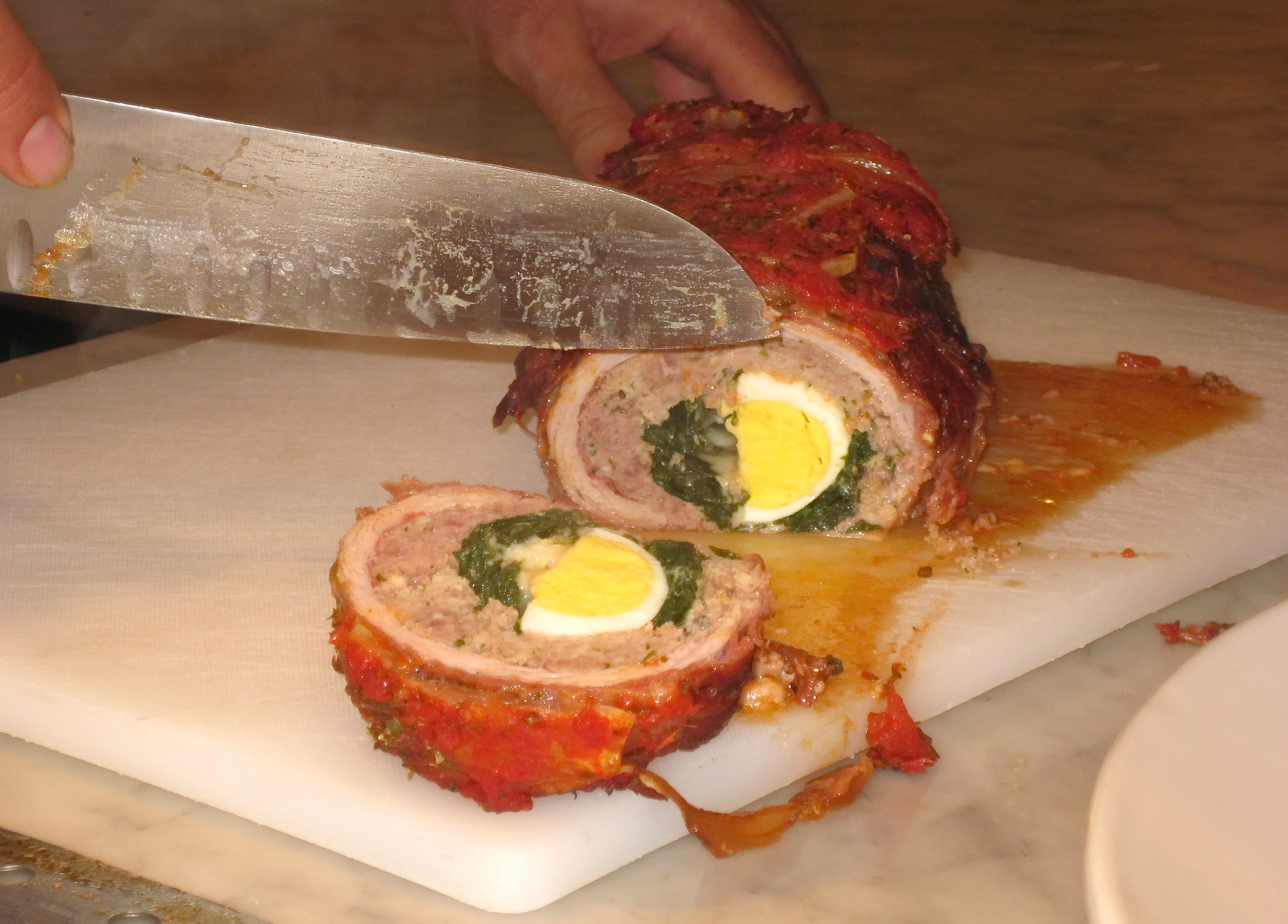
Farsu magru

Farsu magru, also spelled farsumagru and also referred to as farsumauru, falsomagro and falsumagru, is a traditional meat roll dish in Sicilian cuisine that dates to the 13th century. Farsu magru is available in many areas of Sicily, but some serve it only for special occasions. This roast is prepared mainly in rural regions in the interior of the island.

== Etymology ==
Farsu magru means 'false lean', meaning 'lean' in the sense that a relatively small amount of meat ingredients are used to prepare the dish, which is otherwise substantial in size. The "false lean" moniker has also been claimed to describe the way in which the lean, low-fat cuts of meat that are typically used in the dish contrast with the stuffing, which has a higher fat content.

== History ==
Farsu magru dates to the 13th century in Sicily, during the time of the Angevin invasion of the island. It has been stated that the dish's name is based upon the Middle French word farce, which means 'stuffing'. During this time, farsu magru was a simpler dish, typically prepared by simply rolling meat around bread crumbs. As time passed, the dish became more complex, with the addition of more ingredients.

== Preparation ==
Farsu magru is prepared with beef or veal slices that are flattened and superimposed to form a large rectangle. On top of this is a layer of thin bacon slices. For the filling, crushed bread slices, cubed cheese and ham, chopped onions, garlic, and fresh herbs are mixed together. Subsequently, the filling is evenly distributed, and hard boiled eggs are laid in the middle. The meat is then rolled around the eggs, tied together and cooked in an oven. The dish can also be cooked by poaching. It is topped with tomato sauce or tomato purée.

== Service ==
The dish is typically sliced after cooking occurs. In Sicily, farsu magru is sometimes served at room temperature, along with a fennel salad. Some Sicilians serve the dish only on special occasions.

== See also ==
- List of rolled foods
- Scotch egg
