= Lamprais =

Sri Lankan rice dish

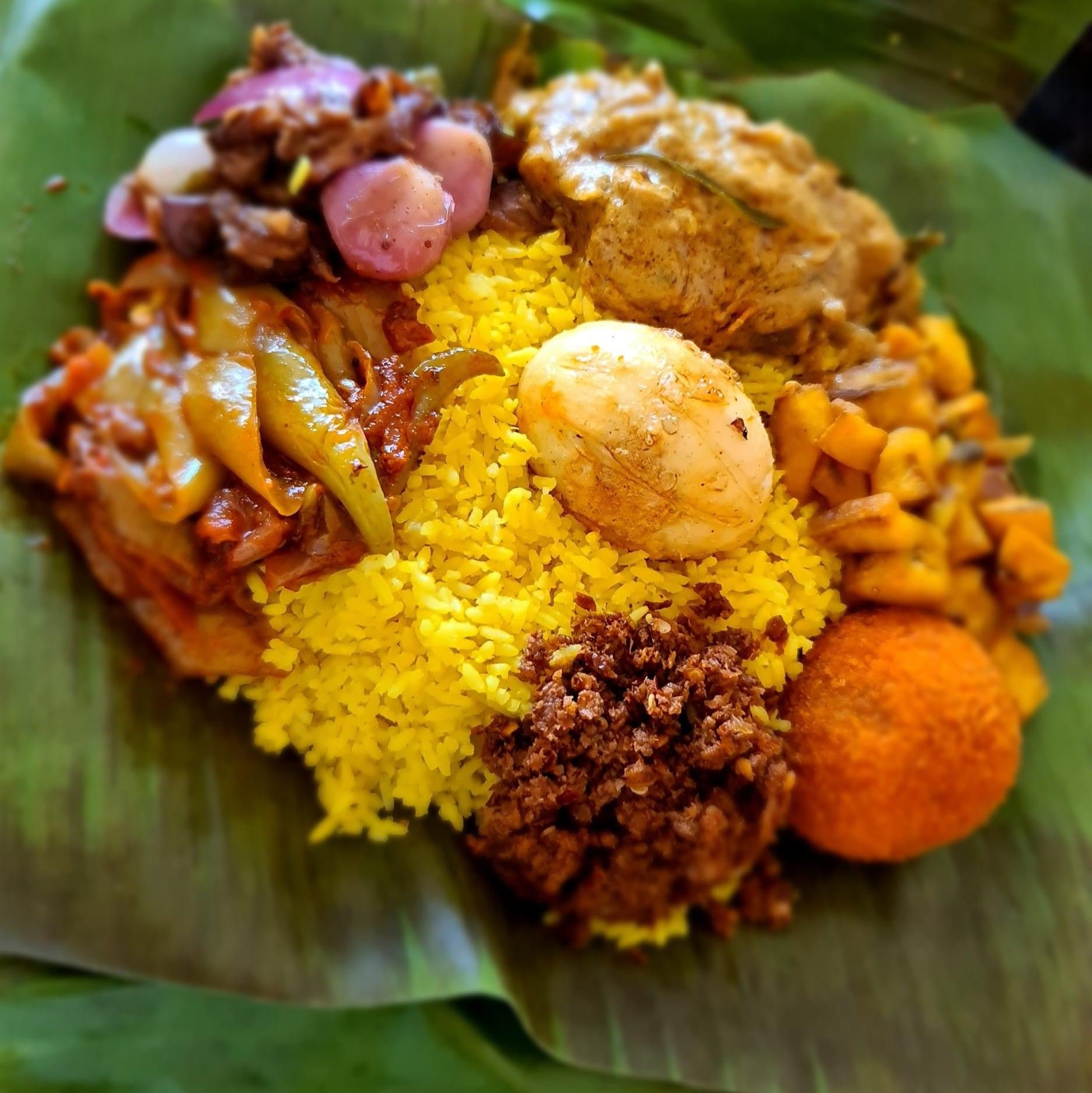
- A serving of lamprais
- Type: Main meal
- Course: Main meal
- Place of origin: Sri Lanka
- Main ingredients: mixed meat curry, ghee rice, ash plantain, frikkadeller meatballs, belacan, seeni sambol, eggplant pahi

Lamprais, (Sinhala ලම්ප්‍රයිස් ; Tamil லம்ப்ரைஸ்), also transliterated in English as "lumprice", "lampraise" or "lumprais", is a Sri Lankan dish that was introduced by the country's Dutch Burgher population. Lamprais is an Anglicised derivative of the Dutch word lomprijst, which loosely translated means a packet or lump of rice, and it is also believed the dish has roots in the Indonesia dish lemper.

== History ==
From 1658 until 1796, the coast of Sri Lanka was under Dutch rule. The Dutch Burghers (an ethnic group of mixed Dutch, Portuguese Burghers and Sri Lankan descent) came up with the dish. The dish itself is not a native dish to the Netherlands but is based on the Javanese meal lemper. Lemper is a snack consisting of shredded seasoned meat and glutinous rice wrapped in a banana leaf. The Dutch in Dutch Ceylon are likely to have adapted this dish from the Dutch East Indies in the early 16th century.

One of the first literary mentions of lamprais was in Hilda Deutrom's Ceylon Daily News Cookery Book, published in 1929.

== Composition ==
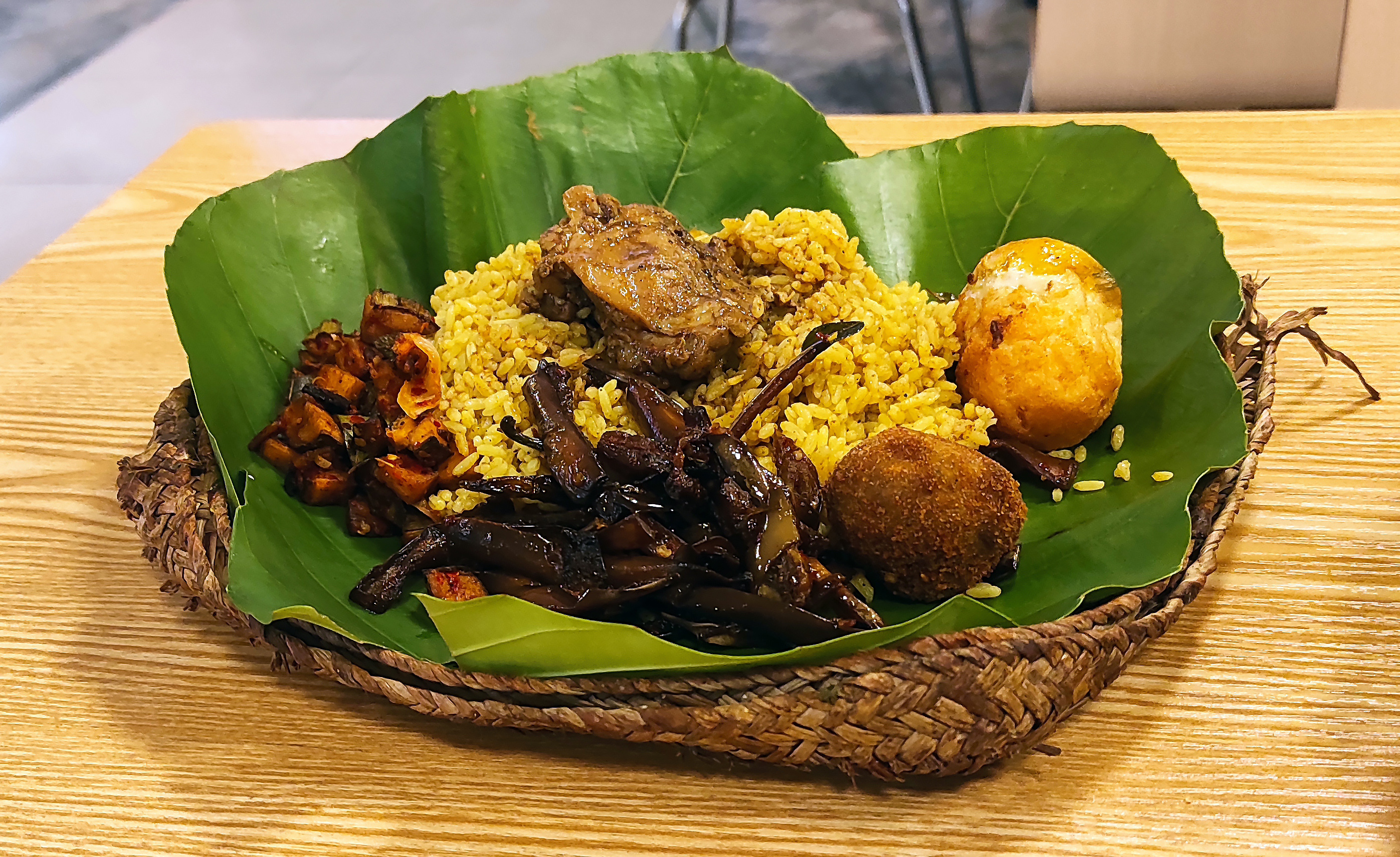
Lamprais, comprising chicken, egg, cutlet, fried eggplant and ash plantain

It consists of two special curries (a three-meat curry, often including beef, pork and chicken, and ash plantain with aubergine), seeni sambol, belacan, frikadeller meatballs and rice boiled in stock, all of which is wrapped in banana leaves and baked in an oven. The rice is made by frying raw short-grain rice with onions and spices in butter or ghee and then cooking it in a meat stock. A hard-boiled egg which has been deep-fried is also a common, but non-traditional, addition.

The traditional recipe always contains three meat items; however, modern versions can include just a single meat, such as fish or chicken, or may be vegetarian.

== See also ==
- Lemper
