= Silverside (beef) =

Cut of beef

Trimmed silverside

Silverside is a cut of beef from the hindquarter of cattle, just above the leg cut. Called "silverside" in the UK, Ireland, South Africa, Australia and New Zealand, it gets the name because of the "silverwall" on the side of the cut, a long fibrous "skin" of connective tissue (epimysium) which has to be removed as it is too tough to eat. The primary muscle is the biceps femoris. Silverside is boned out from the top along with the topside and thick flank.

In most parts of the U.S., this cut is known as outside or bottom round, or rump roast (which means something different in countries using the British beef cut scheme).

== Usage ==
Silverside beef is a lean cut, and thus is often cooked via braising or other indirect heating methods in a pot roast recipe. It may also be thinly sliced for minute steak or beef olives, or butterflied to enhance tenderness.

In South Africa, Australia, Ireland and New Zealand, silverside is the cut of choice for corning or brining, so much so that the name "silverside" is often used to refer to corned beef (also called salt beef) rather than any other form of the cut. In South Africa this cut is often used to make biltong (a form of dried, cured meat).
