= Lemper =

Indonesian savoury snack made of glutinous rice

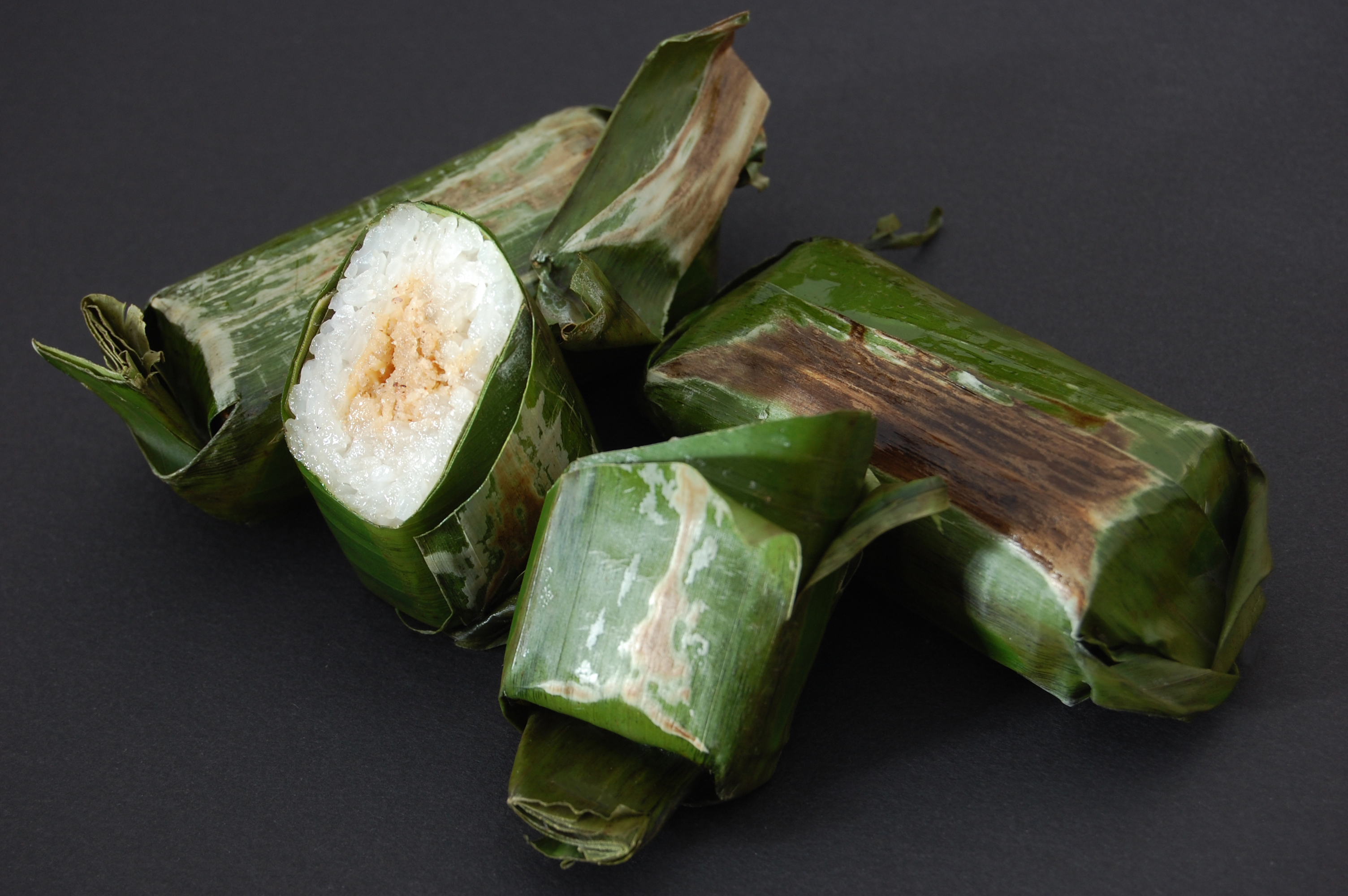
- Lemper wrapped in banana leaves
- Type: Kue / Snack
- Course: Snack / Appetizer
- Place of origin: Indonesia
- Region or state: Nationwide
- Serving temperature: Warm or room temperature
- Main ingredients: Glutinous rice; chicken, fish, abon (meat floss) or serundeng
- Variations: Semar mendem, Lemper bakar

Lemper (id) is an Indonesian savoury snack made of glutinous rice filled with seasoned shredded chicken, fish, abon (meat floss) or serundeng. The specific lemper filled with seasoned shredded chicken is called lemper ayam (lit: chicken lemper). The meat filling is rolled inside the rice, in a fashion similar to an egg roll; this is in turn rolled and wrapped inside a banana leaf, oil paper, plastic sheet, or tinfoil to make a packet ready for serving. If banana leaf is not available, corn husk can be used. Lemper are most often seen as snacks, but may sometimes be served as appetizers as well. Lemper usually has an elongated shape, similar to lontong.

Lemper is very similar to arem-arem and bakcang (Chinese zongzi), and also resembles Japanese onigiri.

== Ingredients and cooking method ==
The glutinous rice is soaked and cooked with coconut milk and salt. The filling is made of shredded chicken breast, chicken stock, garlic, candle nut, ground coriander, cumin, brown sugar, vegetable oil, minced shallot, coconut milk, kaffir lime leaves, salt and pepper. Other than chicken, shredded fish, abon (beef meat floss), or serundeng might be used as filling. When the cooked glutinous rice is cool enough to handle, the chicken filling is placed on the glutinous rice and rolled in a banana leaf, wrapped and secured with biting or lidi semat, a small wooden "needle" made of coconut leaf midrib or bamboo. Then these banana leaf packages are steamed or grilled. This releases a distinct pleasant aroma of toasted banana leaf.

== Varieties ==
- Semar Mendem: A variant snack almost identical to lemper. Instead of a banana leaf wrapping, semar mendem uses a thin omelette made from egg and flour as a wrapper, making the entire package edible.
- Lemper Bakar: A grilled variation where the banana-leaf-wrapped lemper is toasted over an open charcoal flame, caramelizing the rice surface and imparting a smoky aroma.

== See also ==
- Lamprais
- List of steamed foods
- Nasi bakar
- Onigiri
- Pastil
- Rempah udang
- Tamales
