= Zrazy =

Meat roulade dish

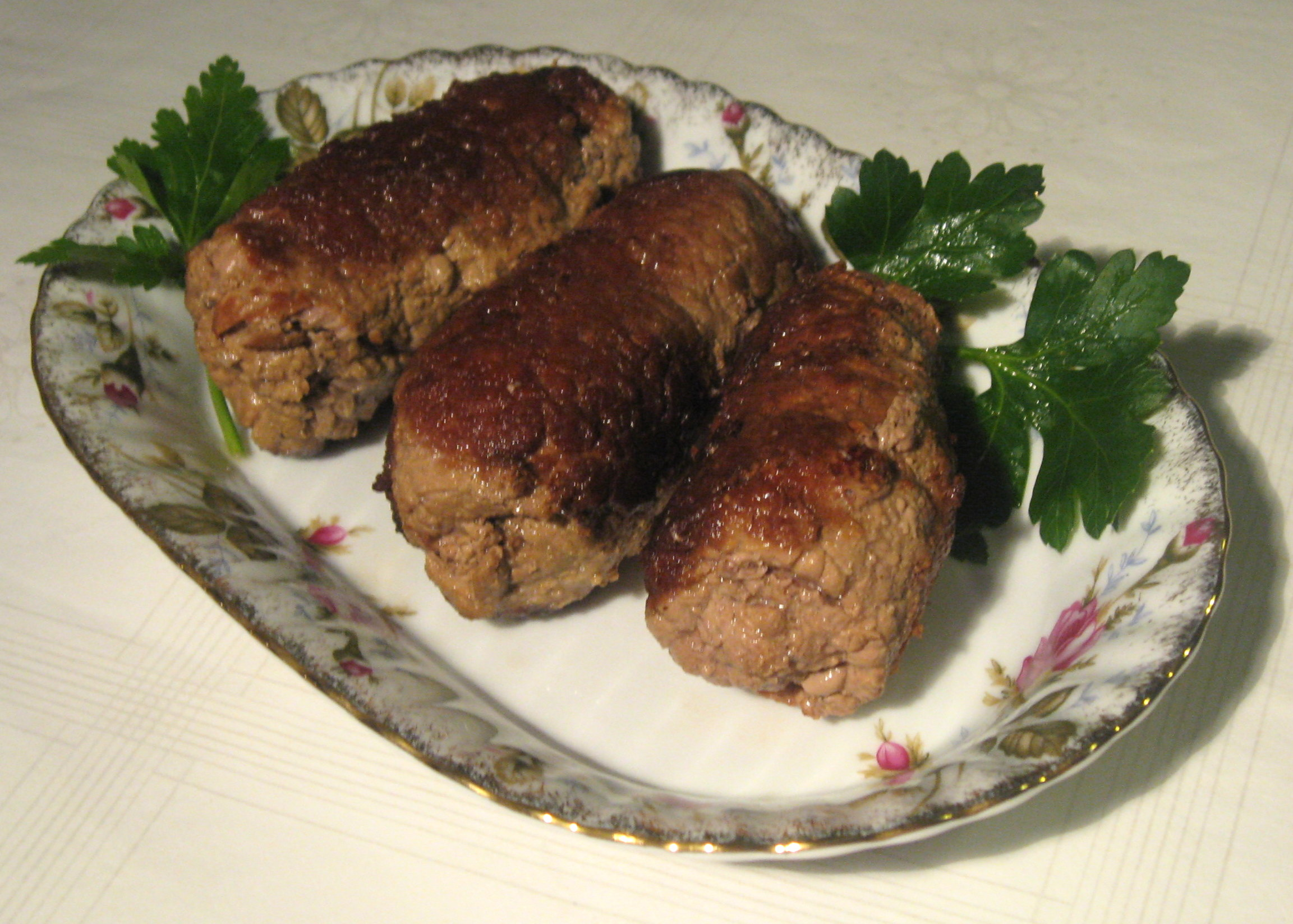
- Zrazy on a plate.
- Type: Main course
- Place of origin: Polish–Lithuanian Commonwealth
- Region or state: Poland, Lithuania, western Belarus
- Serving temperature: Hot
- Main ingredients: beef

Zrazy or zrazi (Polish: zrazy [ˈzrazɘ], Lithuanian: zrazai or mušti suktinukai) is a meat roulade dish popular in Poland (Silesian rouladen), western Belarus and Lithuania. Its origin can be traced back to the time of the Polish–Lithuanian Commonwealth.

== Ingredients ==
Classic zrazy have a rolled shape and are made of thin slices of beef, which is flavored with salt and pepper and stuffed with vegetables, mushrooms, eggs, and potato.

== History ==
It is unknown exactly when this dish was invented as well as which region of the former Polish–Lithuanian Commonwealth first produced it; both Poland and Lithuania claim to have created zrazy.

In its traditional shape, it probably comes from Lithuanian cuisine, although its name comes from Polish and means a slice of meat or roast cut off from the whole.

== See also ==
- Roulade – general French-origin word for rolled meat dishes
- List of beef dishes
- List of stuffed dishes
