= Roulade =

Savoury or sweet dish, filled and rolled into a spiral shape

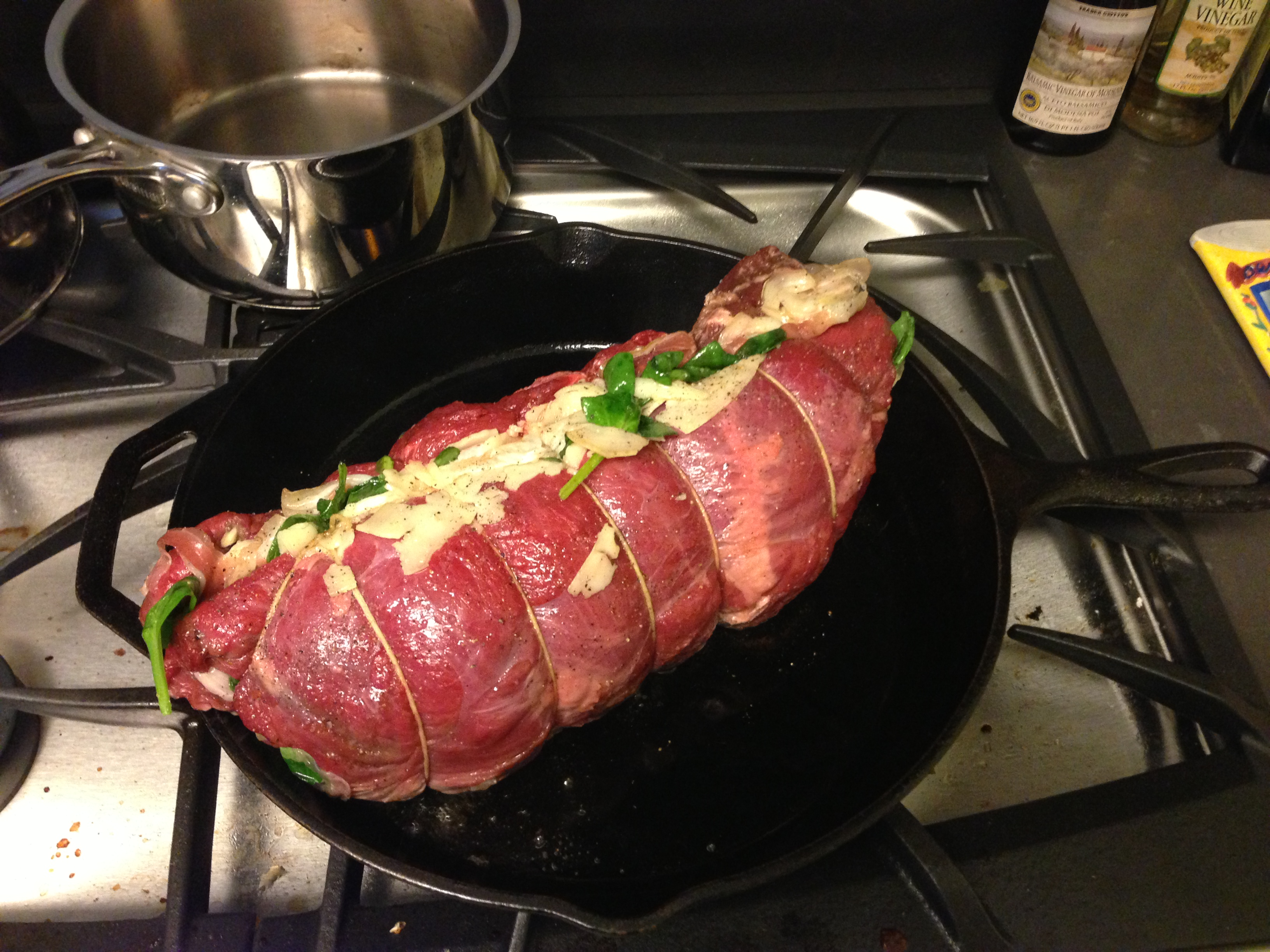
Flank-steak roulade being browned

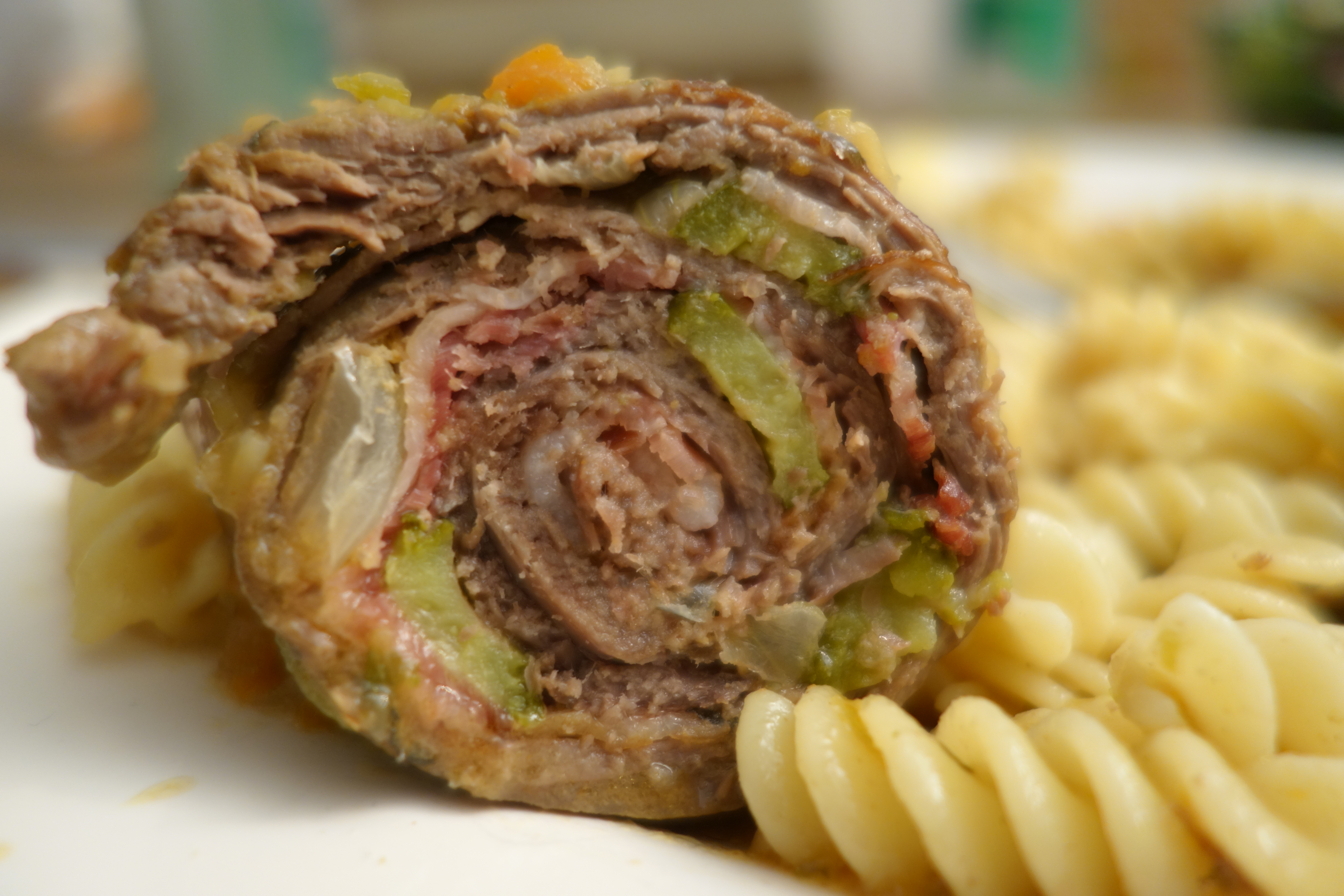
Sliced-beef roulade filled with bacon, onion and pickled cucumber

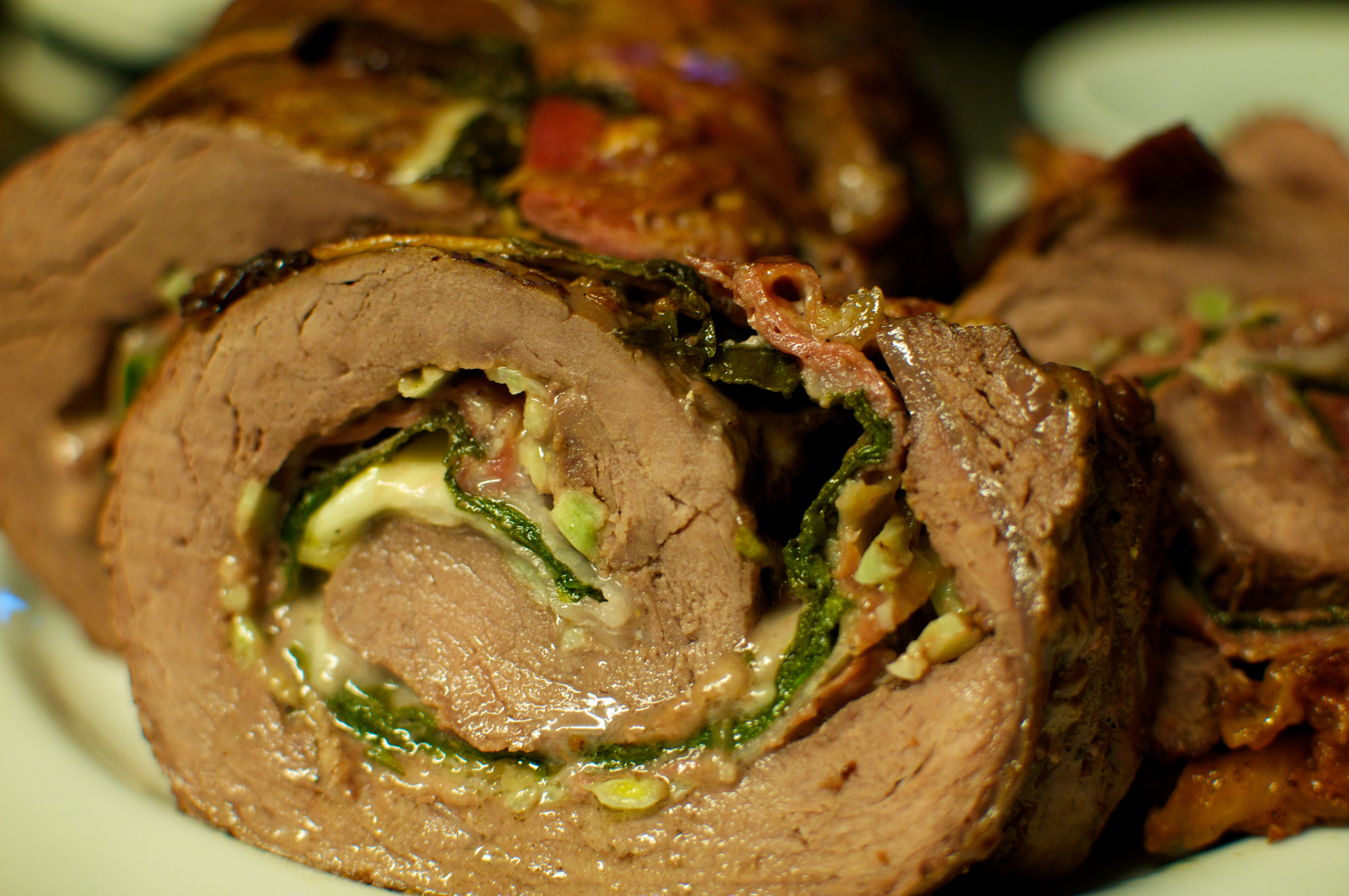
Cooked flank-steak roulade

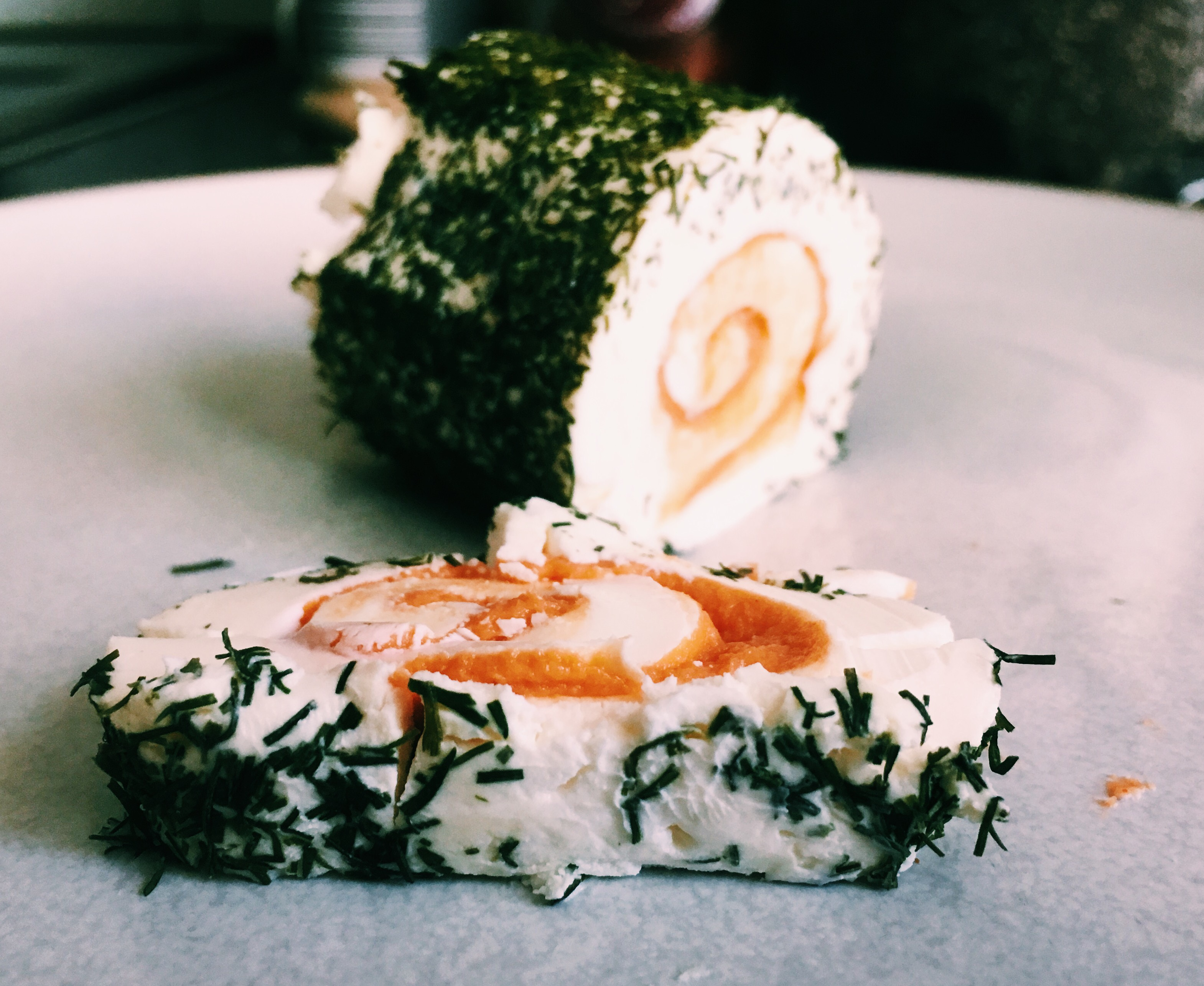
Salmon and dill mini-roule

A roulade (/ruːˈlɑːd/) is a culinary term for a savory or sweet dish that is filled and rolled into a spiral shape. The dish is usually made from a flat piece of meat, fish, bread, pastry, meringue or sponge cake wrapped around a soft filling to create a spiral pattern. A Swiss roll exemplifies a sweet roulade. Various European cuisines produce roulades. The name "roulade" originates from the French word rouler, meaning "to roll".

== Savoury variants ==
A savoury roulade consists of a slice of meat, fish or pastry rolled around a filling such as cheese, vegetables, or other meats or fish. A roulade, like a braised dish, is often browned then covered with wine or stock and cooked. Such a roulade is commonly secured with a toothpick, metal skewer or a piece of string. The roulade may be sliced into rounds.

=== Variants ===
- Paupiette, French veal roulade filled with vegetables, fruits or sweetmeats
- Rinderroulade, German and Hungarian beef roulade filled with onions, bacon and pickles. Also Kohlroulade, cabbage filled with minced meat.
- Španělské ptáčky (Spanish birds) are roulade in Czech cuisine. The recipe is practically identical with German Rouladen, perhaps omitting wine and adding a wedge of hard boiled egg and/or frankfurter to the filling. Unlike the large roulade, sliced before serving, the "birds" are typically 10 cm (3.9 in) long, served whole with a side dish of rice or Czech style bread dumplings.
- Szüz tekercsek ("Virgin rouladen"), in Hungary a dish filled with minced meat.
- Zrazy (or "rolada"), in Poland
- Rollade, in the Netherlands. Most 'rollades' are made from rolled pork. A typical Dutch 'rollade' is not filled. Common spices are pepper, salt and nutmeg.
- Rolade from Indonesia, the main ingredient is minced chicken or beef and wrapped in omelette. In Central Java, rolade tahu daun singkong made from tofu and cassava leaves.
- Involtini. In Italian cuisine, roulades are known as involtini (singular involtino). Involtini can be thin slices of beef, pork or chicken rolled with a filling of grated cheese (usually Parmesan cheese or pecorino romano), sometimes egg to give consistency and some combination of additional ingredients such as bread crumbs, other cheeses, minced prosciutto, ham or Italian sausage, mushrooms, onions, garlic, spinach, pinoli ("pine nuts"), etc. Involtini (diminutive form of involti) means "little bundles". Each involtino is held together by a wooden toothpick, and the dish is usually served (in various sauces: red, white, etc.) as a second course. When cooked in tomato sauce, the sauce itself is used to toss the pasta for the first course, giving a consistent taste to the whole meal. In southern parts of Italy such as Sicily, where fish are a more plentiful element of cuisine, involtini can sometimes be made with fish such as swordfish. This term encompasses dishes like braciole (a roulade consisting of beef, pork or chicken usually filled with Parmesan cheese, bread crumbs and eggs) and saltimbocca. There are also vegetarian involtini made with eggplant.

== Sweet variants ==
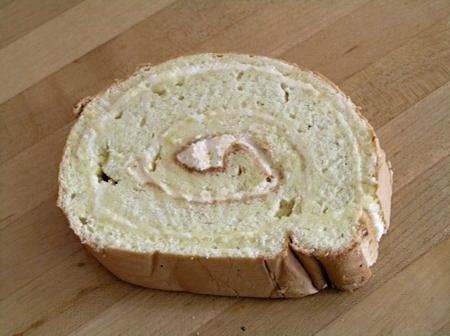
A slice of cake roulade

Sweet roulades are made with a flat sponge cake (either made with genoise or chiffon cake), meringue suet pudding or pastry.

The flat sponge, meringue or pastry is covered with filling and then rolled up. Fillings can include whipped cream, fruit, fruit preserves, nuts and chocolate.

=== Variants ===
- Poppy seed roll
- Jam roly-poly
- Swiss roll
- Yule log (cake)

== See also ==
- Cinnamon roll
- Matambre
- Negimaki
- Rullepølse
- Slavink
