= Banana leaf =

Leaf of banana plant

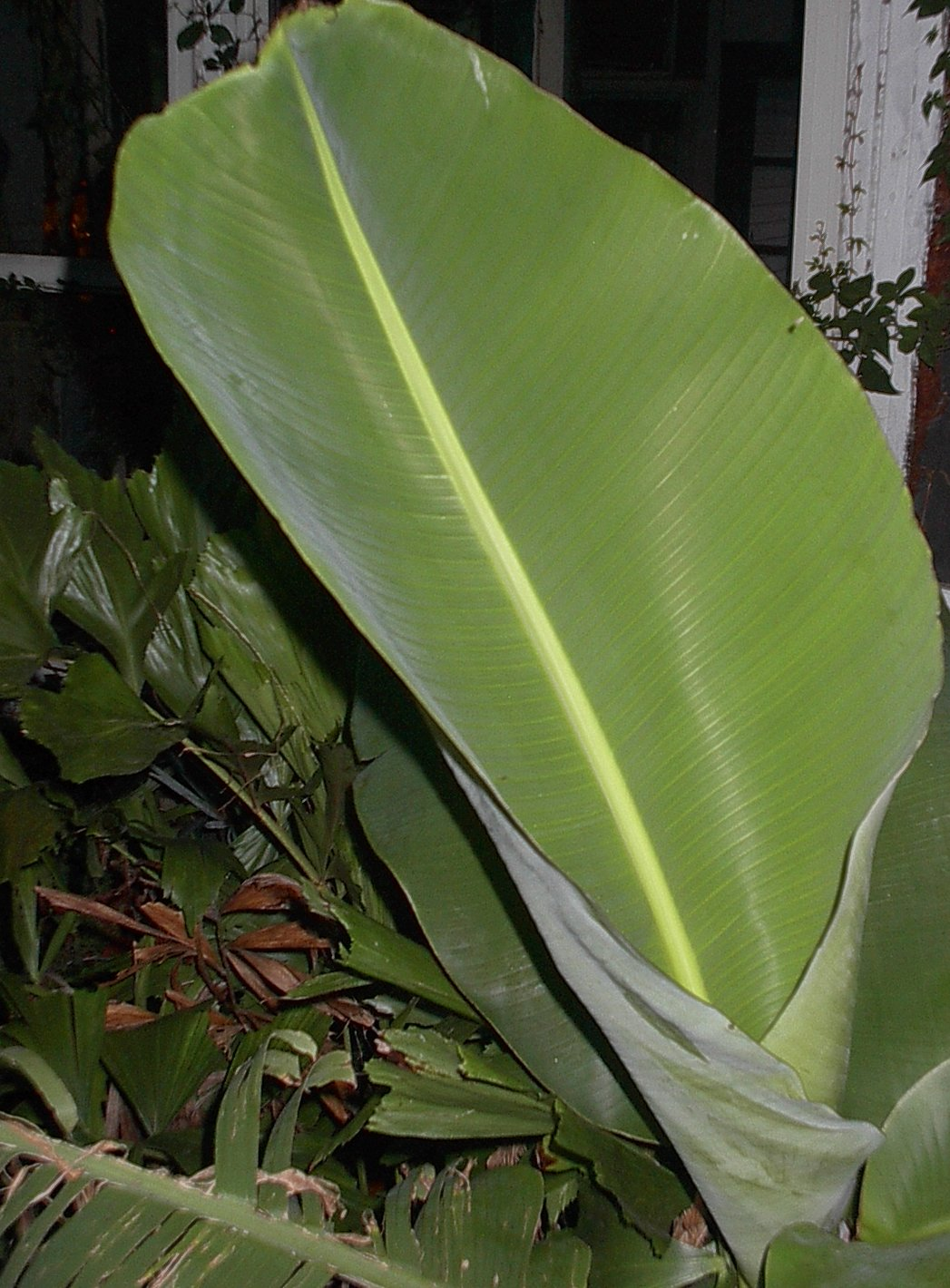
Leaf of a banana tree

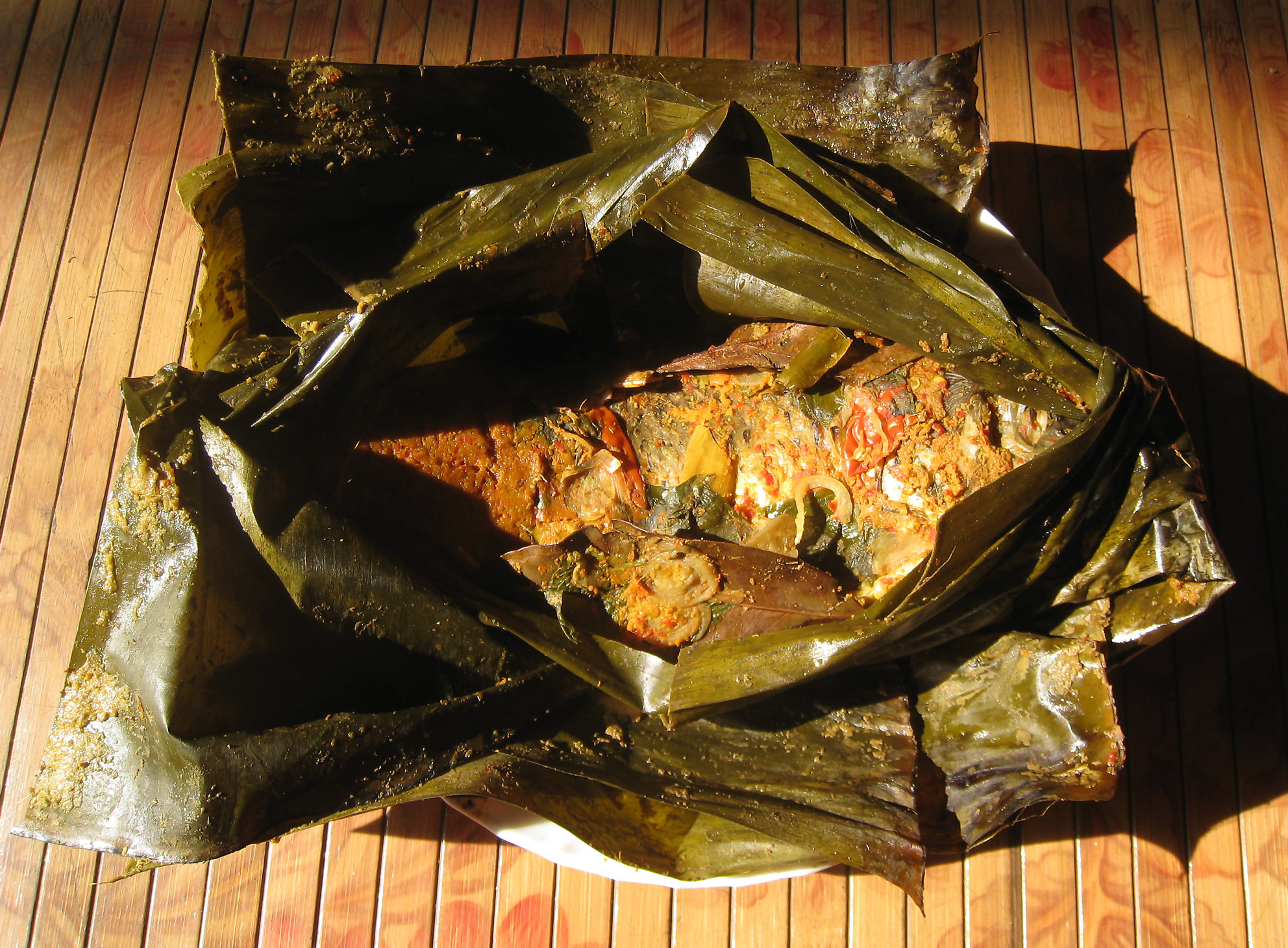
Carp pepes, carp fish cooked with spices in a banana leaf.

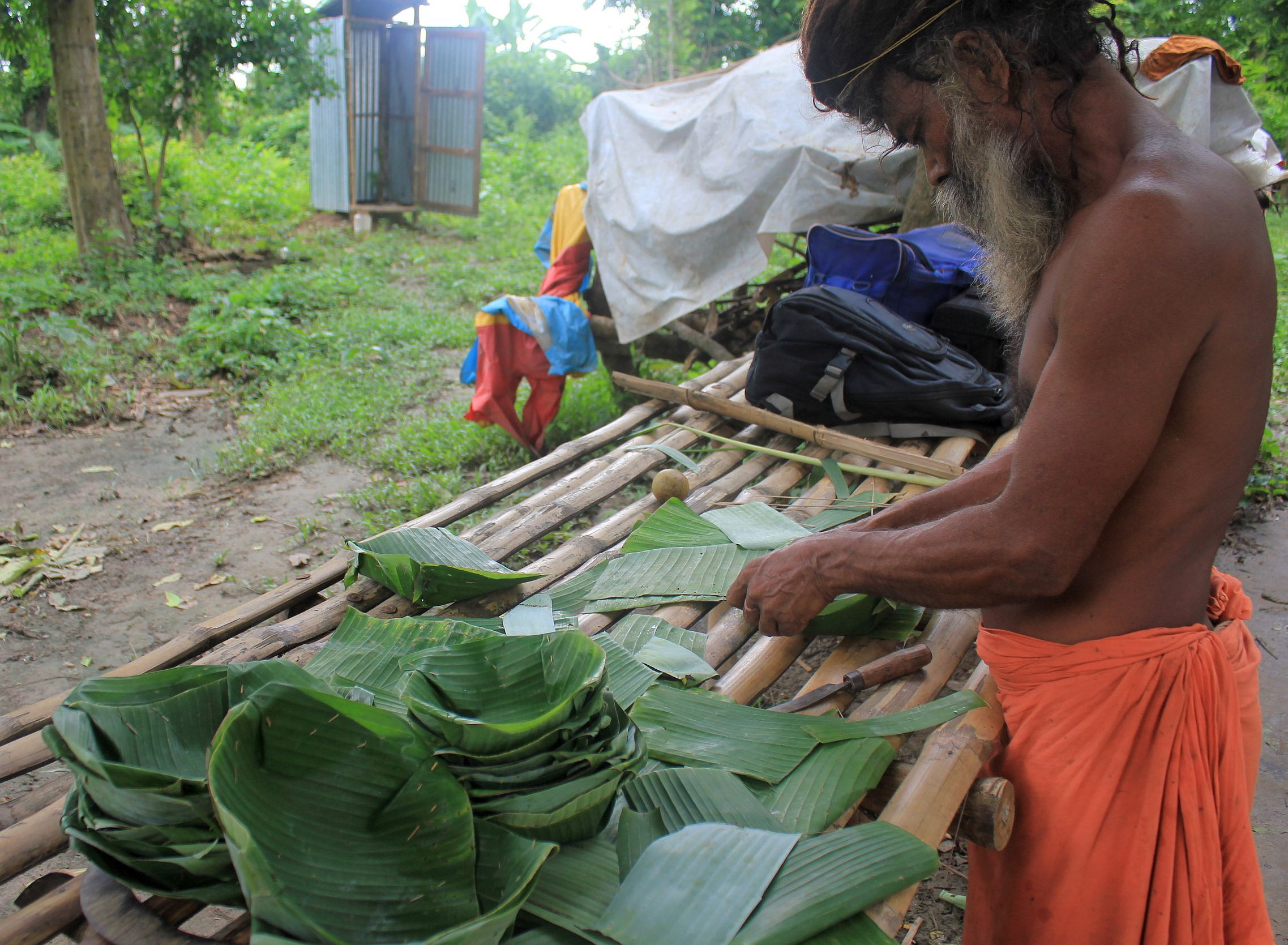
Making of banana leaf plates which replace paper as a waste solution

The banana leaf is the leaf of the banana plant, which may produce up to 40 leaves in a growing cycle. The leaves have a wide range of applications because they are large, flexible, waterproof and decorative. They are used for cooking, wrapping, and food-serving in a wide range of cuisines in tropical and subtropical areas. They are used for decorative and symbolic purposes in numerous Hindu and Buddhist ceremonies. In traditional home building in tropical areas, roofs and fences are made with dry banana-leaf thatch. Bananas and palm leaves were historically the primary writing surfaces in many nations of South and Southeast Asia.

== Applications in cuisine ==
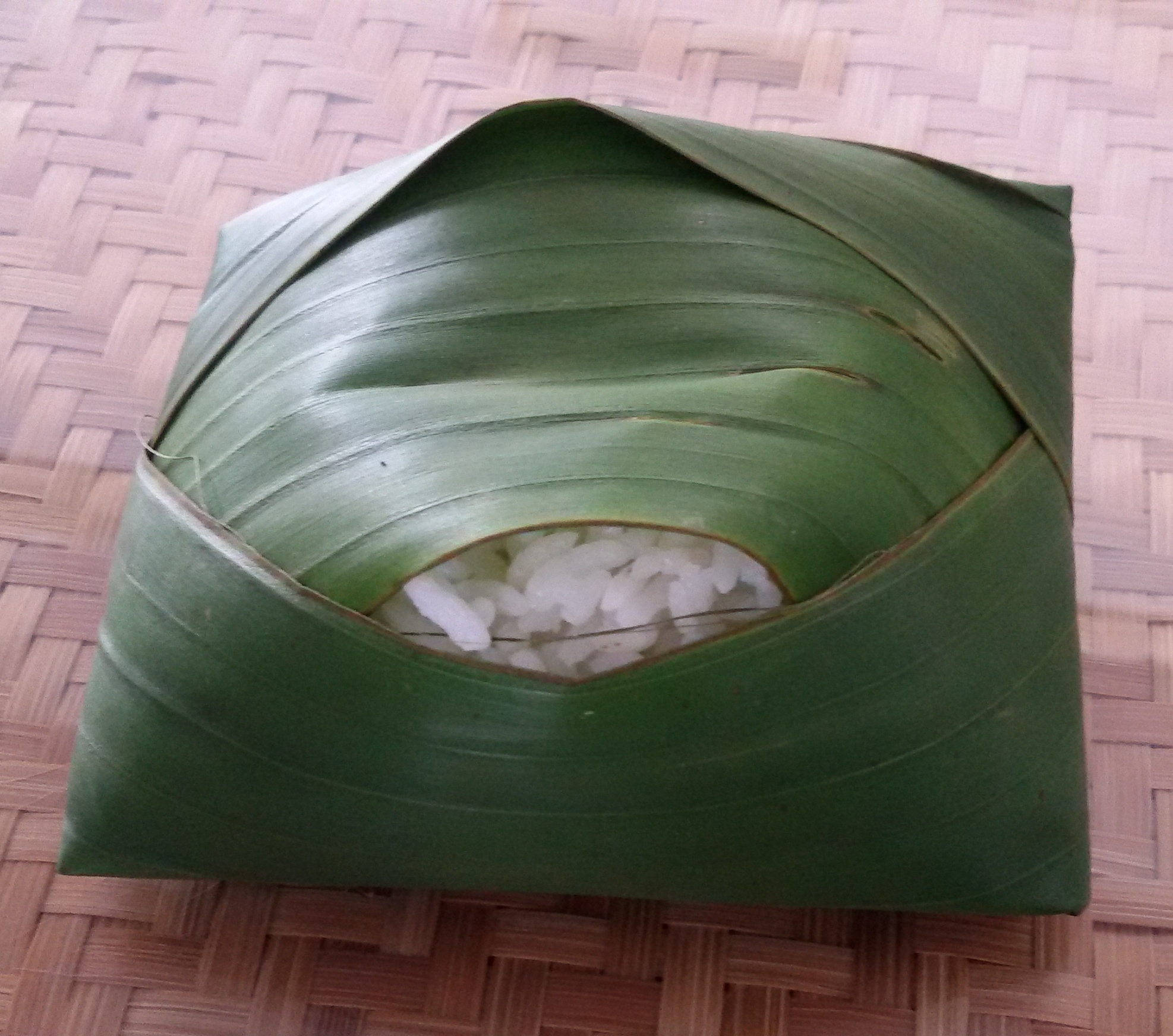
Steamed rice wrapped inside banana leaf to enhance its aroma and aesthetic

Banana leaves are large, flexible, and waterproof. They impart an aroma to food that is cooked in or served on them; steaming with banana leaves imparts a subtle sweet flavor and aroma to the dish. The leaves are not themselves eaten and are discarded after the contents are consumed.

Besides adding flavor, the leaves keep juices in and protect food from burning, much as foil does. In Tamil Nadu (India) leaves are fully dried and used as packing material for foodstuffs, and are also made into cups to hold liquids. The dried leaves are called vāḻaic caruku (வாழைச் சருகு) in Tamil. Some South Indian, Filipino, and Khmer recipes use banana leaves as a wrapper for frying. The leaves are later removed. In Vietnamese cuisine, banana leaves are used to wrap foods such as cha-lua.

== By region ==
=== Austronesia ===
Banana leaves are a standard item in traditional cooking of the Austronesian peoples which propagated and spread the plant across Maritime Southeast Asia all the way to tropical Polynesia.

==== In Java ====
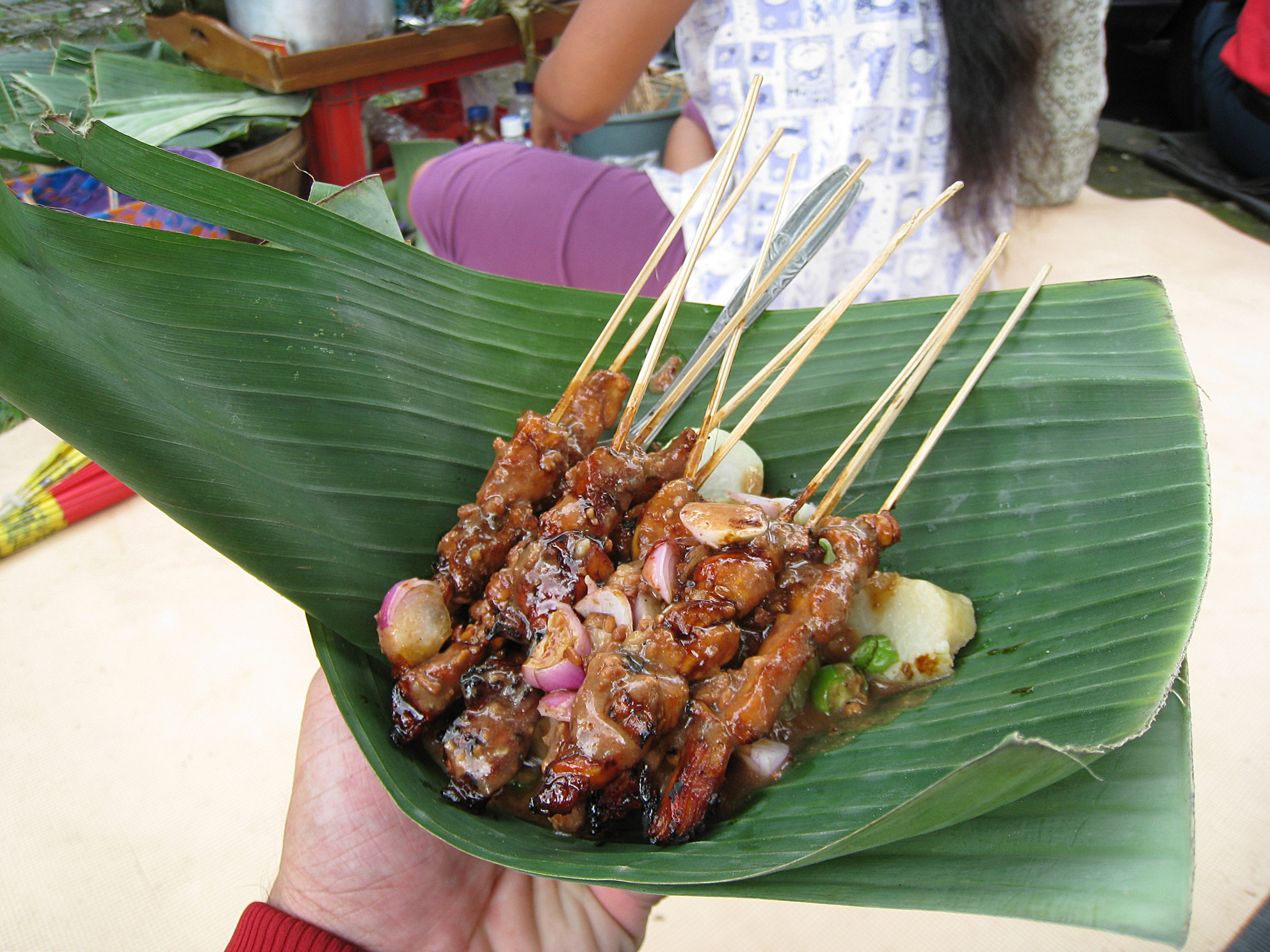
Chicken satay served in pincuk, a banana leaf cone-shaped plate.

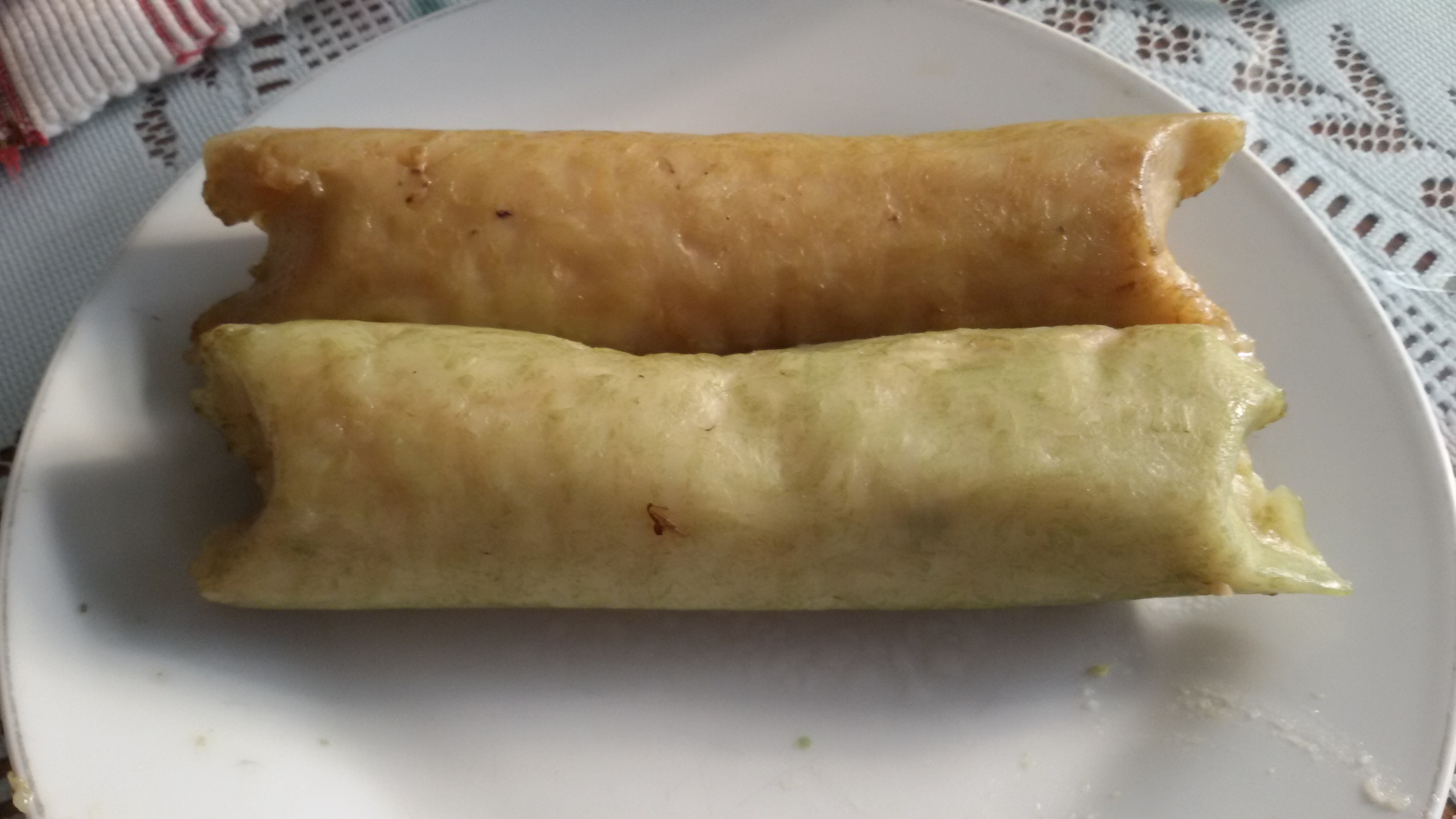
Unwrapped lontong. Different colors depend on the banana leaf which is used as the wrapper.

The banana leaf is employed in packaging of dishes across Java like the Sundanese pepes and Javanese botok; these leaf packets of food are steamed, boiled, or grilled on charcoal. Banana leaves are also used to wrap several kinds of kue such as nagasari or kue pisang and otak-otak, and also to wrap pressed sticky-rice delicacies such as lemper and lontong.

Banana leaves are made into shallow conical bowls called pincuk secured with lidi semat (pins made from the coconut-leaf midrib), usually to serve rujak tumbuk, pecel or satay. These pincuk are receptacle held in the left hand, while the right one is used to take the food. It also functions as a traditional disposable take-away food container. The cleaned banana leaf is often used as a placemat; cut banana-leaf sheets placed on rattan, bamboo or clay plates are used to serve food. Decorated and folded banana leaves on woven bamboo plates are used as serving trays, tumpeng rice cones, and holders for jajan pasar or kue delicacies.

==== In Malay Peninsula and nearby islands ====
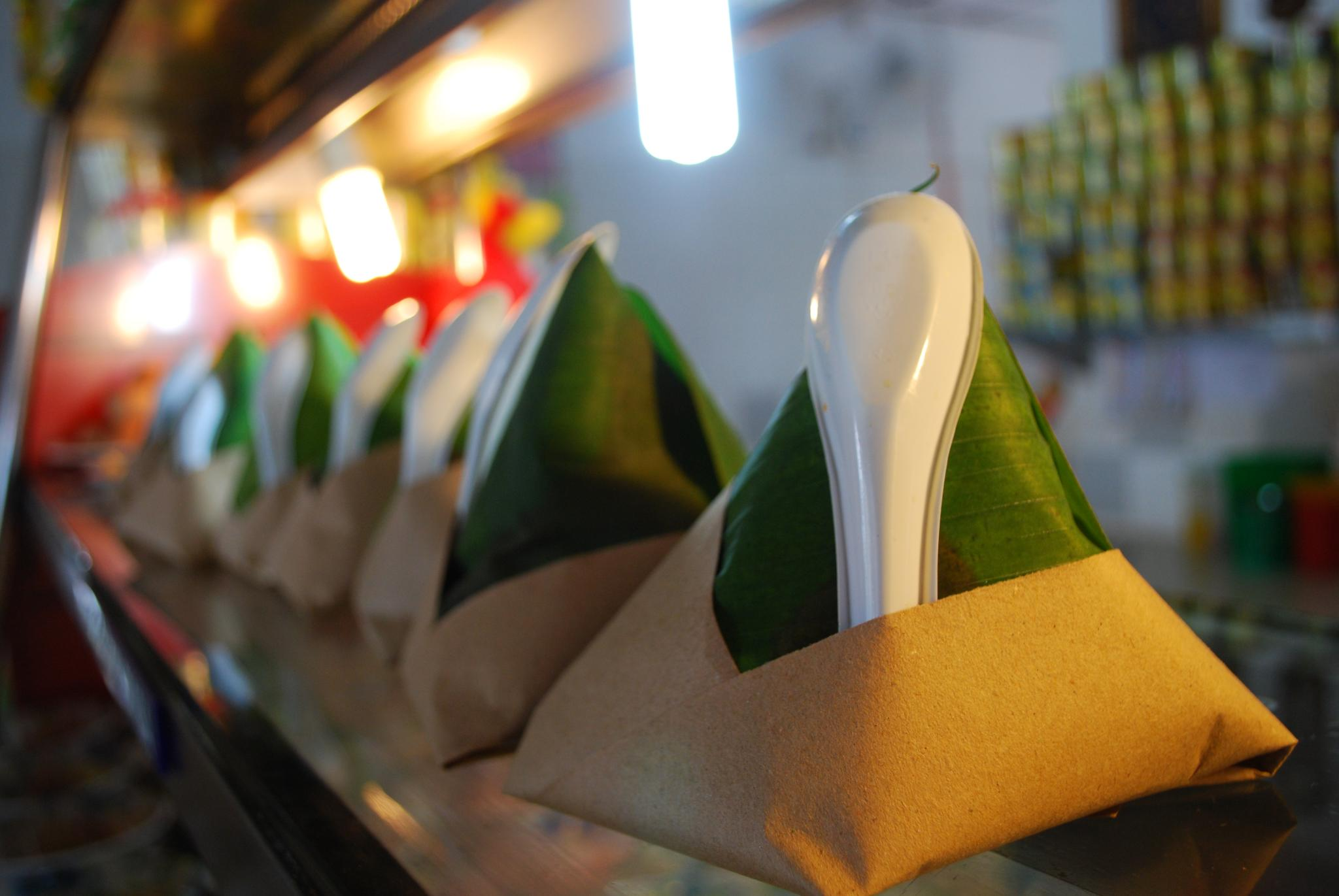
Nasi lemak wrapped in a combination of banana leaves and Kraft paper

Banana leaves are used to wrap certain kuih and otak-otak common of Malay foods in Malaysia, Singapore and Indonesia. Nasi lemak are also commonly wrapped with banana leaves before the arrival and availability of (old) newspaper, as banana leaves add fragrance to the rice.

Banana leaves in Singapore were once singularly sourced locally from suppliers in Kerbau Road until they were moved to a market near Kandang Kerbau Hospital, with leaf supplies now procured from Pontian and Batu Pahat in neighbouring Johore.

==== In Sumatra ====
Banana leaves are part of the Mandailing nasi upah-upah rice set topped with dishes of fish, prawns, chicken, goat and buffalo heads, placed on a banana leaf-lined bamboo tray (nyiru) and covered with another banana leaf sheet on top.

==== In Philippine cuisine ====
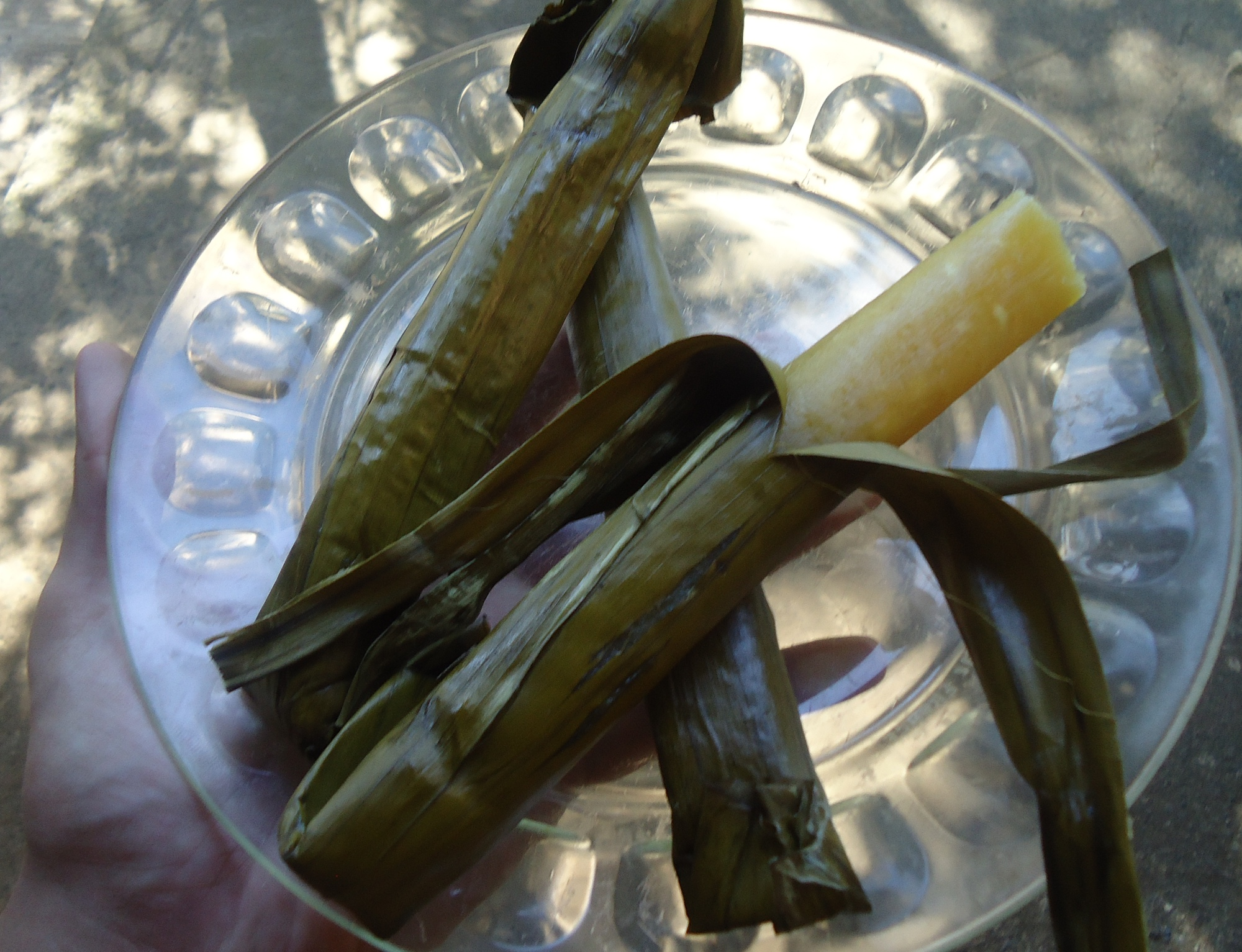
Sumang kamoteng kahoy (cassava suman), wrapped in banana leaves.

Banana leaves are the traditional method of serving food in Philippine cuisine, with rice and other dishes laid out on large banana leaves (a salo-salo, reminiscent of a buffet) and everyone partaking using their bare hands (kamayan).

Additionally, another traditional method of serving food is by placing it on a banana-leaf liner placed over a woven bamboo rice winnowing basket (bilao); large bilao used for removing chaff from grains were normally used directly for such servings, there are now smaller woven trays or carved wooden plates of the same kind in Filipino restaurants used specifically for serving food. Banana leaves are also commonly used in wrapping food (binalot), and are valued for the aroma they impart to the food. Specific Philippine dishes that use banana leaves include suman and bibingka.

==== In Polynesian cuisine ====
The Hawaiian imu used to cook foods is often lined with banana leaves.

=== South Asia ===
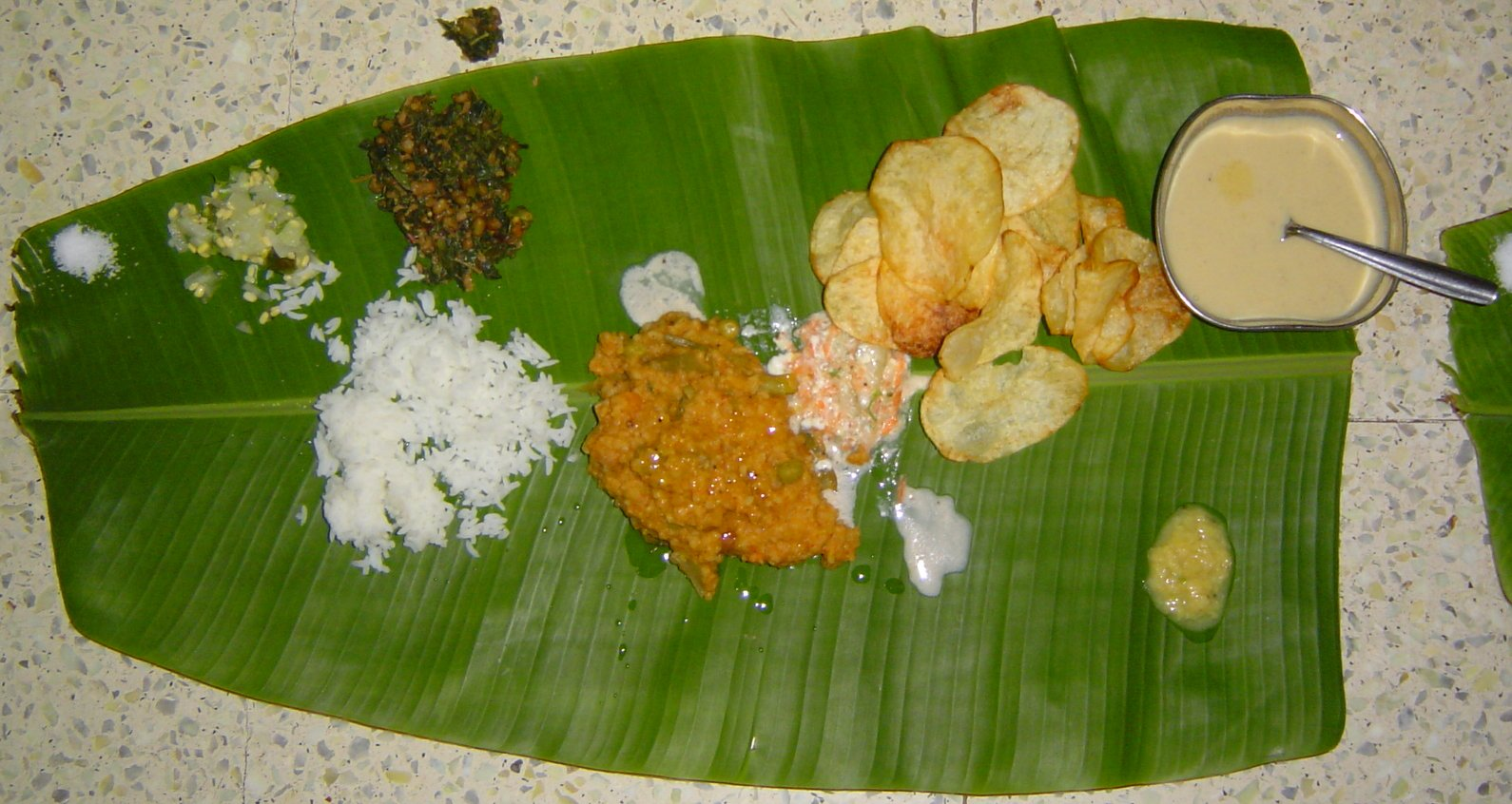
Food served on a banana leaf in Karnataka, India.

South Indian cuisine and Bengali cuisine is traditionally served on a banana leaf, especially in the states of Andhra Pradesh, Telangana, Tamil Nadu, Karnataka, Kerala, Odisha, West Bengal and also in Sri Lanka. In these regions, it is customary to serve food on a banana leaf during festive occasions, and banana is often a part of the food served. In Maharashtra, on special occasions like Ganesh chaturthi, people eat off banana leaves. The banana leaf is also used for wrapping fish, which can then be steamed.

==== In Bengali cuisine ====
In Bengali cuisine, banana leaf is used to prepare Paturi, which is marinated and seasoned boneless fresh fish steamed and cooked inside a banana leaf and eaten on it. Commonly, Bhetki and Ilish are used in making Paturi. Bengali cuisine also have a great significance and sacred believe for having meal on a banana leaf.

==== In Kerala cuisine ====
In kerala cuisine, banana leaf is used to prepare ila ada, or vazha ila ada, a kind of steamed dumpling filled with coconut sweetened using jaggery or sugar. Another popular dish is meen vazha ilayil pollichathu or just meen pollichathu, Literally meaning fish grilled inside banana leaf. This is made by wrapping fish in a banana leaf with curry like base. A key need for banana leaf in grilling is to provide a non sticky layer, which will avoid the fish from burning and sticking to the grill, griddle or embers due to direct contact. The leaf also imparts a smell and flavour to the fish. Similar trend is found in packed meals called "pothichoru", which literally means packed rice. Banana leaf is lightly heated under the flame to turn it flexible and then rice, curries and stir fries are poured in, folded and tied using a thread. This is similar to the srilankan dish lamprais whose name inturn originates from the Indonesian dish lemper brought in by Dutch colonists.

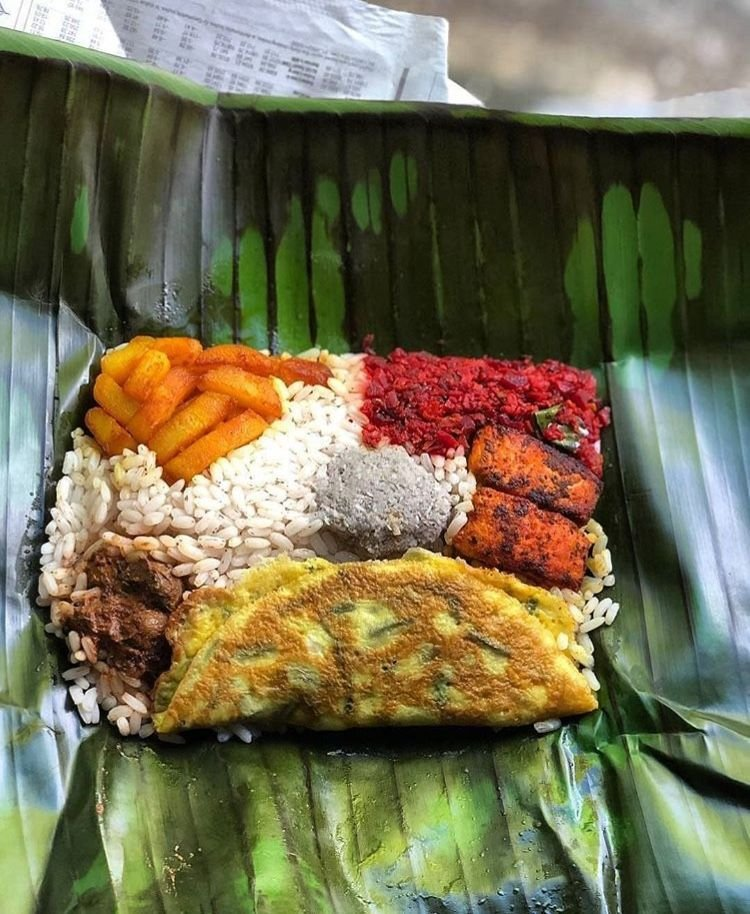
pothichoru showing rice, curries, fish and stir fries prepared to be wrapped in a Banana leaf. The key purpose is to carry the food without leakage, but it also imparts a characteristic smell and flavour of the banana leaf to the rice.

==== In Indian cuisine ====
In India, white rice (or parboiled rice in authentic South Indian restaurants) is served on a banana leaf with an assortment of vegetables, pickles, appalam and other regional condiments (usually sour, salty or spicy). The banana leaf acts as a disposable plate and it in itself is not consumed. The choice of banana leaves is mainly due to the broad leaves as well as to the ubiquity of the plant in South India. Typically, only vegetarian gravy (e.g. sambar) will be served on the rice as it is meant to be a traditional vegetarian dish. However, sometimes boiled eggs, curried or fried meat or seafood are served as well. Traditionally, there will be two servings of rice with the first being served with gravy, side dishes and condiments whilst the second serving will be just rice with curd as a palate cleanser. Banana leaf meals are eaten by hand. Traditionally, only the right hand is used, and only the tips of the fingers should touch the food. Any part of the finger beyond the first knuckle or the palm must not touch the food. Parts of the banana leaf meal etiquette also dictates that, after the meal, the guest must always fold the banana leaf inwards as a sign of gratitude to the host, even when the host is the proprietor of an eatery. However, when meals are served at funeral wakes, the leaf is folded outwards as a sign of condolence to the family of the deceased. Due to this, folding the leaf outwards is considered rude in any other circumstance.

=== Latin America ===
==== In Caribbean and Mexican cuisine ====
Guanimos are Dominican tamales made with cornmeal, stuffed with ground meat and wrapped with banana leaves.

In Puerto Rico, pasteles are made primarily with fresh green banana dough stuffed with pork, and then wrapped in banana leaves which have been softened at the fire. Many rice dishes in Puerto Rico are cooked with banana leaves as a lid to add flavor and aroma. Fish and pork shoulder can be wrapped in plantain leaves and baked. Guanimes known as Puerto Rican tamales, cornmeal cooked with coconut milk and other ingredients, are wrapped in banana leaves. Sweet cassava tortillas and Puerto Rican arepas are laid on banana leaves for a few hours before cooking. Cazuela is a traditional pie made with coconut milk, squash, sweet potato, spices, and raisins cooked in a clay pot layered in banana leaves.

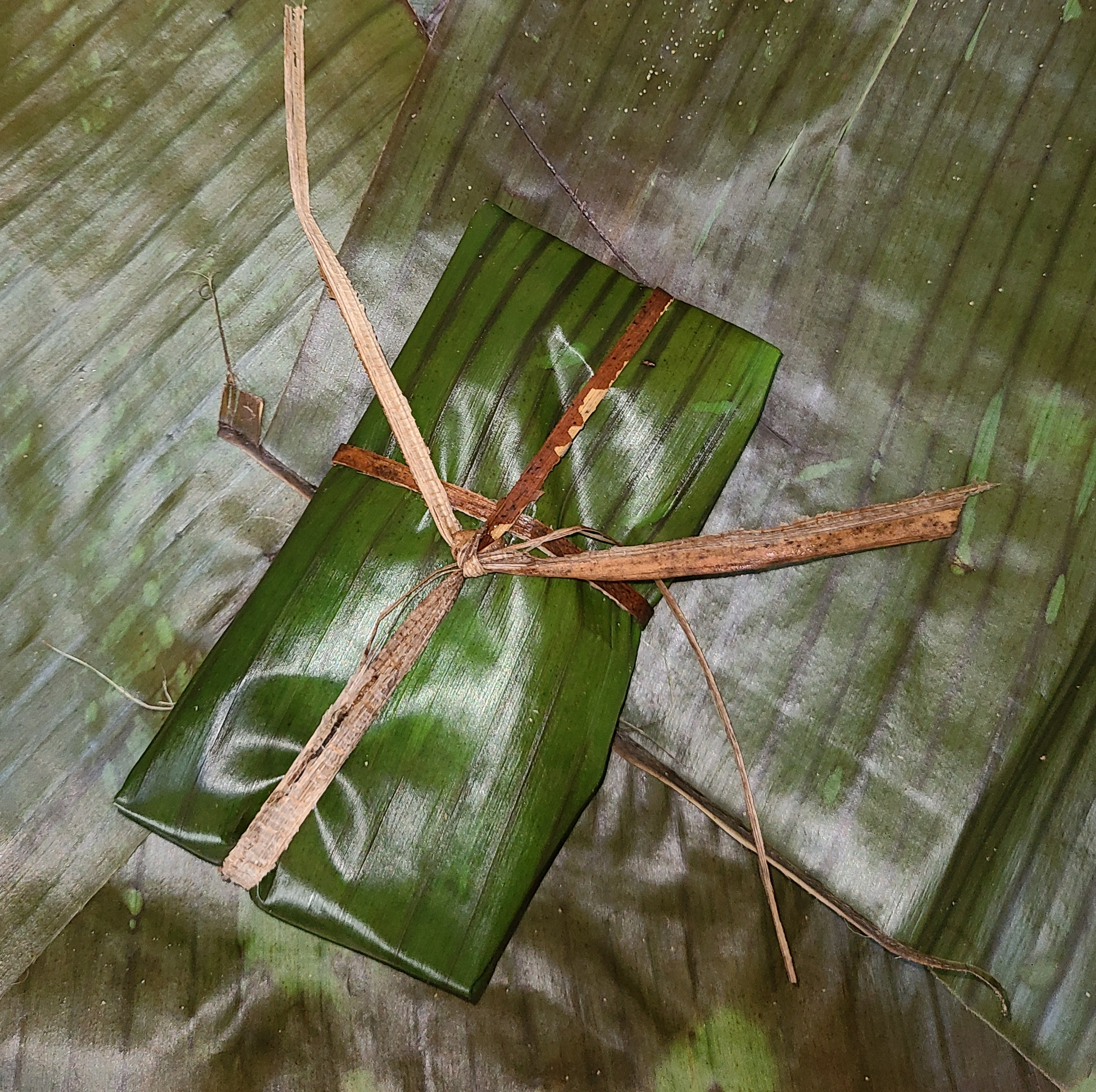
Jamaican tie-a-leaf (duckunoo) in a banana leaf.

In Jamaica, Haiti, Antigua and Barbuda, Belize, French Guiana and some other islands in the Lesser Antilles, there is a dessert called duckunoo or duckanoo, also referred to as tie-a-leaf or blue drawers (draws) (in Jamaica), dokonon (in French Guiana), doukunou (in Haiti), paime (in Trinidad & Tobago), penmi (in St Lucia) and ducunu or tamalito (in Belize). It is similar to tamal dulce (sweet tamale), and is typically made with batata or sweet potato, coconut, cornmeal, spices like cinnamon, nutmeg and anise, brown sugar, coconut milk and vanilla. Sometimes, pumpkin, plantain and raisins are used. The mixture is tied up in a banana leaf, and then cooked in boiling water. The more savoury version, pastelles, is made in Trinidad and Tobago. Also, banana leaves are used in other ways in Jamaican cuisine, like for steaming fish and cooking ackee.

Mexican, and more specifically Oaxacan tamales and a local variety of lamb or barbacoa tacos are often steamed in banana leaves. Banana leaves are used for wrapping pork in the traditional Yucatán dish Cochinita pibil.

==== In Central American cuisine ====
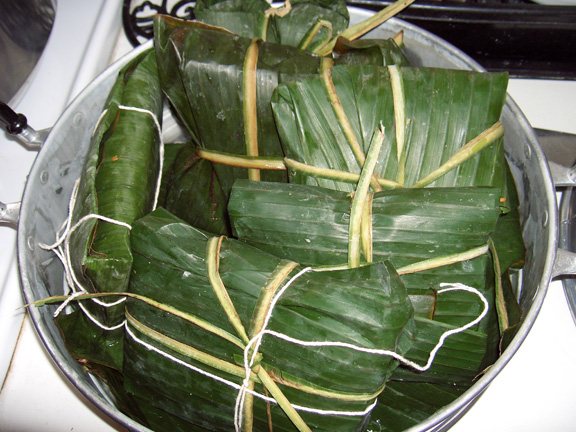
Nacatamales ready to be steamed

Vigorón' is a traditional Nicaraguan dish. It consists of a cabbage salad known as curtido (chopped cabbage, tomatoes, onions, and chile peppers marinated in vinegar and salt), boiled yuca, and chicharrones (fried pork with skin or with meat), wrapped in Banana leaf. Variations of this dish are also found in Costa Rica.

Vaho (or Baho) is a mix of meat, green plantains and yuca cooked in banana leaves.

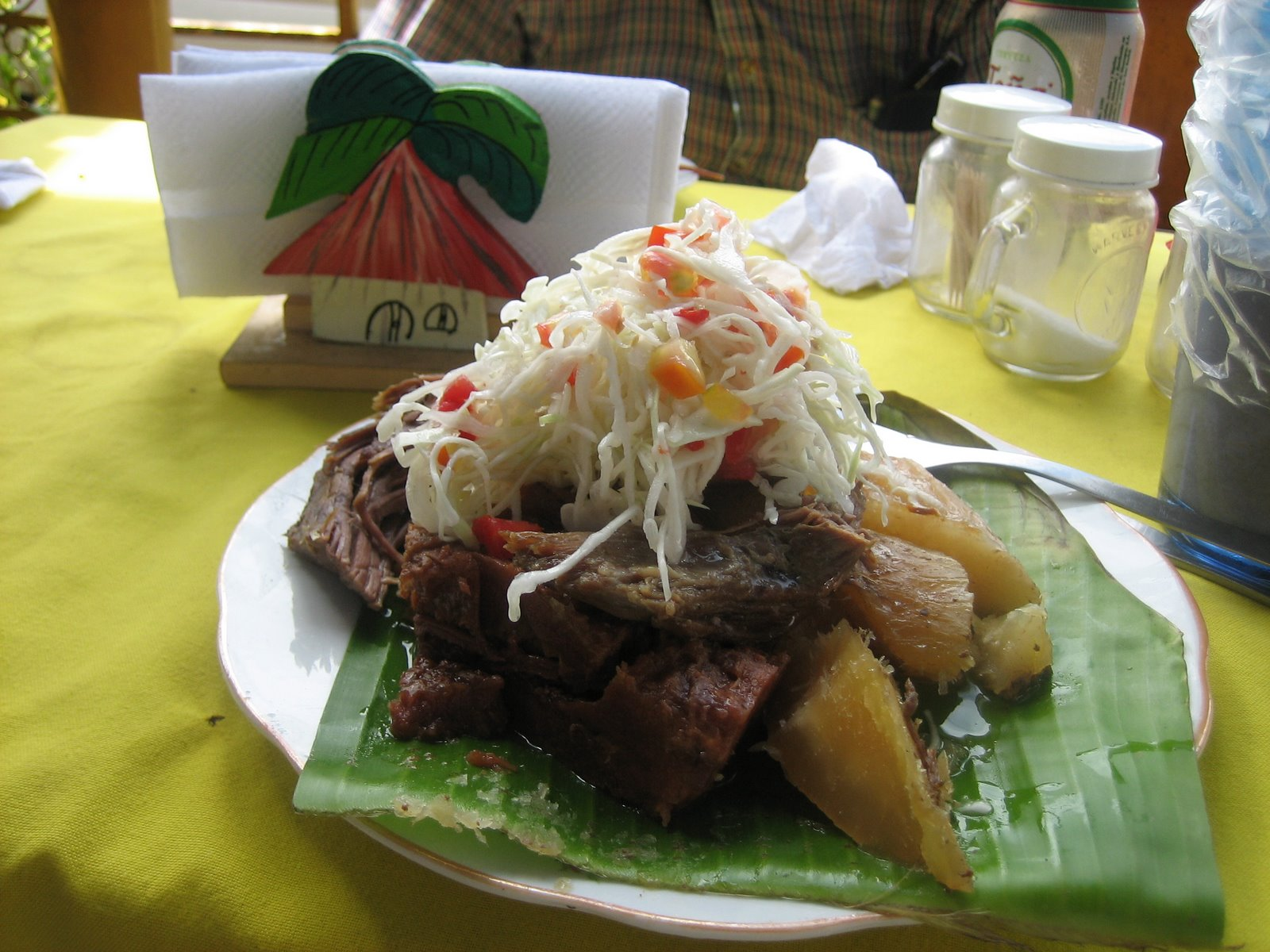
Traditional Nicaraguan Vajo

Tamales made throughout Central America are traditionally wrapped in banana leaves prior to cooking, which imparts a distinctive taste to the nixtamalized corn dough.

Nacatamal is made up mostly of nixtamalized corn masa (a kind of dough traditionally made from a process called nizquezar) and lard, but also includes seasonings such as salt and achiote (annatto). Filling consists of seasoned pork meat, rice, a slice of potato, bell pepper, tomato, onion, olives, cilantro and/or spearmint sprigs, and on occasion, though less commonly, capers, raisins or fresh chile (red or green), all wrapped in banana leaves. This dish is traditional to Nicaragua.

==== In Ecuadorian cuisine ====
Coast side region prepare dishes as Bollo, green plantain and peanut butter batter filled with fish or pork wrapped in a banana leaf, this is then baked in a brick oven or steamed. Manabi province prepare a dish called Tonga a chicken stew with rice dyed with achiote and peanut salsa, all this served on a banana leaf and then wrapped. Amazonian provinces has Maito where grilled fish is served with yucca and rice, wrapped in a banana leaves.

=== Other uses ===
Banana leaves have also been proposed as a material out of which to make trays for airline meals, to reduce their environmental impact.

== In tradition and religion ==
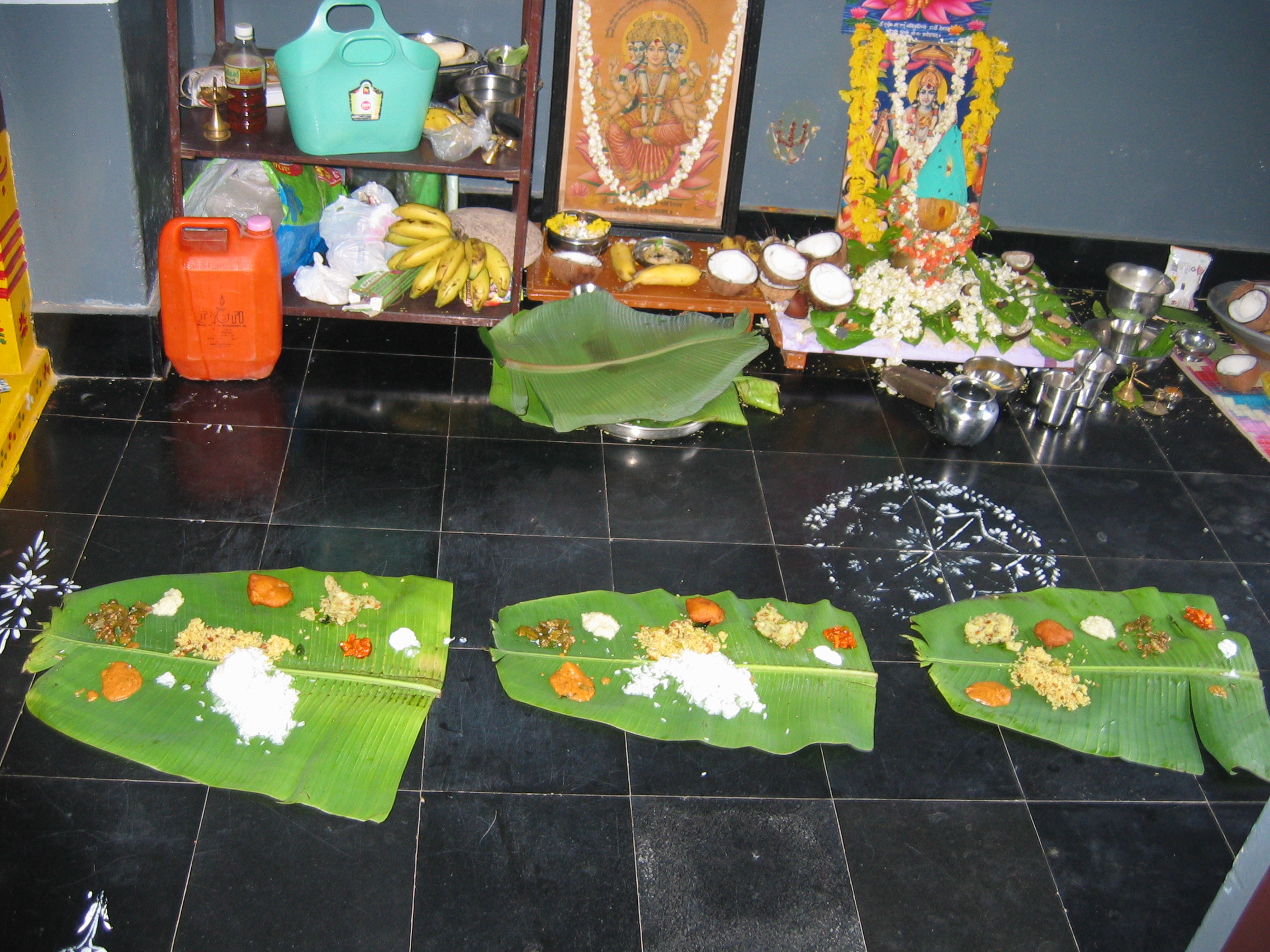
Prasadam offered on banana leaves after Puja at a home in Guntur, India.

Banana leaves are used by Hindus and Buddhists as a decorative element for special functions, marriages, and ceremonies in southern India and Southeast Asia. Balinese Hindu prepare banana leaves as containers for floral offerings called canang to the hyang (spirits or deities) and gods. These floral offerings are then placed in various places around the house.

In Upper Myanmar, the banana leaf is used in handcrafting an elaborate multi-tiered offertory known as phetsein kundaung (ဖက်စိမ်းကွမ်းတောင်). In Thailand, banana leaf is used to create an offering bowl called krathong, an important element during festival of Loy Krathong on the full-moon day of the twelfth lunar month. The celebration is meant to pay respects to the Mother of Water called Phra Mae Kong Kha by floating a krathong on a body of water. Other Asian countries also have similar festivals such as in Myanmar, Laos, Cambodia, India and China. Krathong means lotus-shaped vessel, and in it are placed flowers with joss sticks and a candle in the middle. During Loy Krathong, people carry krathongs to the river. After lighting the candles and three joss sticks and making a wish, they will gently place their krathongs on the water and let them drift away with the current. People believed that krathongs will carry their wickedness and bad luck, and after that happiness will come to them. It is a time joy and merrymaking, dancing, singing, and activities with other people. People use banana leaves to make krathongs because it is an organic and natural material, and would decompose easily in the water.

== As a writing surface ==
Banana and palm leaves were historically the primary writing surface in many nations of South and Southeast Asia. This has influenced the evolution of their scripts. The rounded letters of many of the scripts of southern India, Sri Lanka and Southeast Asia such as Oriya and Sinhala, Burmese, Baybayin, and Javanese, for example, are thought to have been influenced by this. Sharp angles and tracing straight lines along the vein of the leaf with a sharp writing implement would risk splitting the leaf and ruining the surface, so rounded letters, or letters with straight lines only in the vertical or diagonal direction, were required for practical daily use.

In such situations, the ribs of the leaves function as the dividing lines of ruled paper, separating lines of text. It is believed that this was so influential in the development of the still-undeciphered rongorongo script of Easter Island that the more elaborate wood tablets developed later were fluted to imitate the surface of a banana leaf.

== Other uses ==
The leaves also contain apiin which is used to make nanoparticle products.

== See also ==
- Patravali, a dried leaf eating plate
- Banana leaf rice
- Strelitzia, a bird of paradise plant with similarly shaped leaves.
- Cochinita pibil, a Yucatán Mexican dish that wraps pork in banana leaves.
- Puto, bibingka, and suman, Filipino rice cakes which are traditionally wrapped in banana leaves.
