= Beef olives =

English meat dish

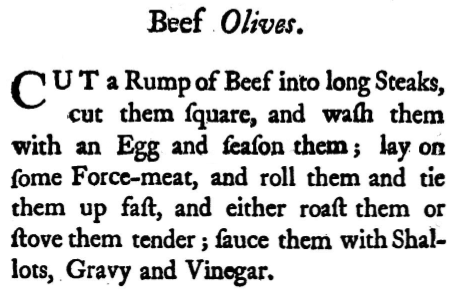
- 1732 recipe
- Alternative names: Veal olives; veal birds
- Type: Meat casserole
- Place of origin: England
- Main ingredients: Beef or veal strips wrapped around stuffing

Beef olives are an English meat dish consisting of slices of beef rolled and tied round a stuffing and braised in stock. Veal is sometimes used instead of beef, but the latter has been more common since the 18th century. Similar dishes are familiar in cuisines of other countries including France, Italy, Germany, Poland and the Czech Republic.

== History and etymology ==
The word "olives" in the name of the dish is a corruption of "aloes" or "allowes", from the Old French alou, meaning lark. It was held that the small stuffed beef (or veal) rolls resembled little birds, particularly those whose heads had been cut off in being prepared for the table. In The Oxford Companion to Food, Alan Davidson observes that although the standard French term for similar beef rolls is paupiettes they have an alternative name – alouettes sans tête ("larks without heads"). Likewise, an alternative English name is "veal birds".

In English usage the term beef (or veal) olives dates back to at least the 16th century. John Florio in his A Worlde of Wordes (1598) refers to "That meate which we call oliues of veale". By the 18th century, beef was more commonly used than veal. Elizabeth Raffald in The Experienced English Housekeeper (1769) gives a recipe for the beef version, as in the 19th century does Mrs Beeton (1861).

Davidson comments that similar rolled and stuffed beef (or veal) dishes are found in the cookery of Germany (Rouladen), Poland (zrazy), and the Czech Republic (ptachky); in Italy, there are several names for versions of the dish, including involtini, braciola and pasteli.

== Ingredients ==
Elizabeth David remarks of the French paupiettes that every cook has a different recipe for them. Recipes vary likewise for the English equivalent:

Cook/writer	Beef	Stuffing	Liquid	Ref
Mrs Beeton	Rump, wrapped in bacon	Minced herbs	Beef and veal stock	
Mary Berry	Silverside or topside	Onions, bacon, mushrooms	Beef stock and tomato purée	
Robert Carrier	Topside	Onions, mushrooms, breadcrumbs	Beef stock	
Ceserani and Kinton	Lean beef	Onions, breadcrumbs	Brown stock	
Keith Floyd	Stewing beef	Minced pork	Red wine	
Prue Leith	Lean beef	Onions, sausage meat	Beef stock and tomato purée	
Richard Olney	Rump or round	Chopped pork, chopped hard-boiled eggs	unspecified	
Elizabeth Raffald	Rump	Breadcrumbs, bone marrow, lemon	"a Pint of Gravy"	
Gary Rhodes	Topside or rump	Minced chicken, onions, mushrooms	Red wine and veal stock	
Katie Stewart	Rump	Mushrooms, breadcrumbs	Stock (unspecified)	

== Sources ==
- Ayto, John (2012). The Diner's Dictionary: Word Origins of Food and Drink. Oxford: Oxford University Press. ISBN 978-0199640249.
- Beeton, Isabella (2006) [1861]. Mrs Beeton's Book of Household Management. London: Bounty. ISBN 978-0-75-371400-3.
- Berry, Mary (1985). Cooking From Your Freezer. Cambridge: Martin. ISBN 978-0-85-941305-3.
- Carluccio, Antonio (2013). Antonio Carluccio's Simple Dishes. London: Quadrille. ISBN 978-1-84-949299-7.
- Carrier, Robert (1963). Great Dishes of the World. London: Thomas Nelson. OCLC 58605494.
- Ceserani, Victor; Ronald Kinton (1972). Practical Cookery. London: Edward Arnold. ISBN 978-0-71-311713-4.
- David, Elizabeth (2008) [1960]. French Provincial Cooking. London: Folio Society. OCLC 809349711.
- Davidson, Alan (1999). The Oxford Companion to Food. Oxford: Oxford University Press. ISBN 978-0-19-211579-9.
- Floyd, Keith (1995). The Best of Floyd. London: Michael Joseph. ISBN 978-0-71-814097-7.
- Leith, Prue (1980). Leith's Cookery Course. London: Fontana. ISBN 978-0-00-635272-3.
- Olney, Richard (1981). Beef and Veal. London: Time Life. ISBN 978-0-80-942852-6.
- Raffald, Elizabeth (1769). The Experienced English House-keeper. Manchester: Harrop. OCLC 504316342.
- Rhodes, Gary (1994). Rhodes Around Britain. London: BBC Books. ISBN 978-0-56-336440-5.
- Stewart, Katie (1972). The Times Cookery Book. London: Collins. ISBN 978-0-00-435162-9.
