= Braciolone =

Italian meat dish

Braciolone is an Italian roulade meat dish consisting of braised beef, veal or pork that is filled with cheese, salami, hard-boiled eggs, and breadcrumbs and then rolled. It is typically served topped with a tomato-based sauce. Various additional ingredients can be used, such as garlic, parsley, walnuts, and pork lard, among others. The hard-boiled eggs are sometimes placed in the center of the roll, which provides a "bull's-eye" appearance when the dish is sliced. It has been described as a large-sized braciola-style dish.

Braciolone is also a dish in Sicilian cuisine and the cuisine of the U.S. state of Louisiana.

== See also ==
- Braciola
