= Braciola =

Any of several Italian dishes

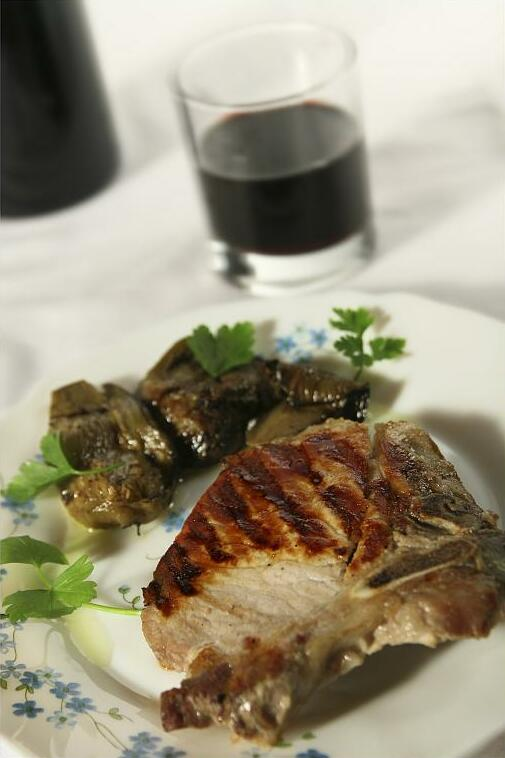
Grilled pork braciola

Braciola (Italian: [braˈtʃɔːla]; pl.: braciole, Italian: [braˈtʃɔːle]) may refer to several distinct dishes in Italian cuisine.

== Cut of meat ==
Braciola may refer to an Italian dish consisting of slices of meat that are pan-fried or grilled, often in their own juice or in a small amount of light olive oil. They are different from the finer cut fettine ('small/thin slices'), which never have bone and are generally thinner.

The French version, brageole, is made from rolls of meat, essentially beef chuck cutlets, seasoned inside with garlic, parsley, salt, and pepper. The meat is usually pan-fried or grilled.

== See also ==
Media related to Braciola at Wikimedia Commons

- Braciolone
- "Braciole", a season one episode of The Bear TV series
