= Top Chef Canada season 5 =

Top Chef Canada
- Season 5
- No. of contestants: 12
- Winner: Nicole Gomes

Release
- Original network: Food Network
- Original release: April 2 – June 4, 2017

Season chronology
- ← Previous; Season 4 Next → Season 6

The fifth season of the Canadian reality competition show Top Chef Canada was broadcast on Food Network in Canada. It was an all-star edition of the Canadian spin-off of Bravo's hit show Top Chef. The program filmed in Toronto, and was hosted by Eden Grinshpan.

== Contestants ==
Contestant	City	Original Season	Original Placing
Elizabeth Rivasplata	Toronto, Ontario	Season 2	10th
Todd Perrin	Quidi Vidi Village, Newfoundland	Season 1	8th
Jonathan Korecki	Ottawa, Ontario	Season 2	3rd
Andrea Nicholson	Toronto, Ontario	Season 1	6th
Trista Sheen	Toronto, Ontario	Season 2	6th
Curtis Luk	Vancouver, British Columbia	Season 2	9th
Connie DeSousa	Calgary, Alberta	Season 1	3rd
Jesse Vergen	Saint John, New Brunswick	Season 4	4th
Dennis Tay	Toronto, Ontario	Season 3	4th
Trevor Bird	Vancouver, British Columbia	Season 2	2nd
Dustin Gallagher	Toronto, Ontario	Season 1	4th
Nicole Gomes	Calgary, Alberta	Season 3	5th

== Contestant Progress ==
No.	Contestant	1	2	3	4	5	6	7	8	9	10
No.	Quickfire; Winner(s)	Dustin	Andrea	Nicole	Nicole	Andrea^{1}	Nicole	Dustin	Dennis	Trevor	Dustin
1	Nicole	IN	HIGH	HIGH	HIGH	WIN	LOW	WIN	LOW	HIGH	WINNER
2	Dustin	IN	IN	WIN	WIN	LOW	WIN	HIGH	HIGH	WIN	RUNNER-UP
3	Trevor	IN	LOW	LOW	IN	HIGH	HIGH	HIGH	WIN	LOW	THIRD-PLACE^{2}
4	Dennis	IN	WIN	HIGH	LOW	LOW	HIGH	HIGH	LOW	OUT	
5	Jesse	IN	IN	HIGH	LOW	HIGH	LOW	LOW	OUT		
6	Connie	IN	LOW	IN	HIGH	LOW	IN	OUT			
7	Curtis	HIGH	IN	LOW	IN	HIGH	OUT				
8	Andrea	HIGH	IN	HIGH	IN	OUT					
9	Trista	WIN	HIGH	IN	OUT						
10	Jonathan	LOW	IN	OUT							
11	Todd	LOW	OUT								
12	Elizabeth	OUT									

^Note 1 : Starting from this quickfire, immunity is no longer available.
^Note 2 : The finale Quickfire was a High Stakes Quickfire with the losing chef being eliminated.

(WINNER) The chef won the season and was crowned Top Chef.
(RUNNER-UP) The chef was a runner-up for the season.
(THIRD-PLACE) The chef placed third in the competition.
(WIN) The chef won that episode's Elimination Challenge.
(HIGH) The chef was selected as one of the top entries in the Elimination Challenge, but did not win.
(LOW) The chef was selected as one of the bottom entries in the Elimination Challenge, but was not eliminated.
(OUT) The chef lost that week's Elimination Challenge and was out of the competition.
(IN) The chef neither won nor lost that week's Elimination Challenge. They also were not up to be eliminated.

== Episodes ==
No. overall	No. in season	Title	Original release date
50	1	"All-Stars Assemble"	April 2, 2017
Quickfire Challenge: The chefs must create a dish inspired by one of the 4 seasons of the year that was on the knife they drew from the knifeblock.; Top: Connie, Dustin; Bottom: Curtis, Dennis; WINNER: Dustin (Summer - Moroccan-style Salad with Roasted Eggplant, Chermoula, Quinoa, Black Currants and Olives); Elimination Challenge: The chefs must create a brand new all-star caliber dish with the ingredients from the dish that sent them packing in their first season.; WINNER: Trista (Scarborough Pot-au-feu - Jerk Chicken, Potato, Carrot & Fennel with a Carrot, Chard and Corn Pistou); ELIMINATED: Elizabeth (Crispy Pig Ear Salad with Confit Cherry Tomatoes, Apples & Fingerling Potatoes)
51	2	"Markets of the World...Unite"	April 9, 2017
Quickfire Challenge: The 11 chefs competed in a three-round mise en place tournament.; Round One: Fillet an entire sea bass; fastest eight move on to Round Two.; Round Two: Brunoise shallots; the five chefs with the highest number of diced shallots in five minutes move on to Round Three.; Round Three: Oysters shuck-off; the two chefs with the highest number of shucked oysters in four minutes move on to Round Four.; The final two chefs were given 15 minutes to make a dish with the ingredients from the first three rounds, plus items from the Top Chef pantry.; Top: Andrea, Dennis; Bottom: Connie, Curtis, Trista; WINNER: Andrea (Oysters Poached in Crème Fraîche White Wine Butter Sauce & Seared Sea Bass); Elimination Challenge: The chefs must create a dish inspired by the city's famous street market that was on the knife they drew from the knifeblock.; WINNER: Dennis (Madrid - 'Nduja, Prawn and Quail Egg on Toast with Romesco & Salsa Verde); ELIMINATED: Todd (Rio de Janeiro - Cod Salad with Fresh & Salt Cod, Capelin & Tomato Salsa); Guest Judges: Susur Lee (Elimination challenge)
52	3	"Feast from the Middle East"	April 16, 2017
Quickfire Challenge: Round 1: The 10 chefs compete head-to-head to make one of the five mother sauces: (Tomate, Béchamel, Espagnole, Hollandaise and Velouté); Eliminated Round 1: Dustin, Trevor, Andrea, Jonathan, Connie; Round 2: Use the sauce to make an all-star quality dish.; WINNER: Nicole (Sauce Tomate - Seared Lamb Chops, Grilled Eggplant, Niçoise Olives & Almond Gremolata); Elimination Challenge: As a team, create a three-course progressive middle-eastern feast: appetizers (meze), entree, and dessert.; WINNER: Dustin (Sabih Baba Hummus - Roasted Eggplant, Chickpeas, Topped with Pickled Beet & Egg and Honey-glazed Quail stuffed with Chicken Farce, Roasted Dates, Pearl Onions & Figs); ELIMINATED: Jonathan (Homemade Flatbread with a White Bean Dip and Spiced Daal Topped with a Salad of Pickled Red Onion & Grilled Kohlrabi); Guest Judges: John Higgins (Quickfire challenge), Sabrina Ghayour (Elimination challenge)
53	4	"Meals Made in Canada"	April 23, 2017
Quickfire Challenge: The chefs must create an ultimate all-star brunch dish.; Top: Nicole, Curtis, Trevor; Bottom: Trista, Jesse, Dennis; WINNER: Nicole (Almond Croissant Pain Perdu with Duck Eggs & Abondance Cheese); Elimination Challenge: Create an all-star quality dish inspired by a great Canadian city.; WINNER: Dustin (Ottawa - Smoked Duck with Mushrooms & Roasted Maple-glazed Apple); ELIMINATED: Trista (Vancouver - BC Salmon & Dungeness Crab, Vermicelli Noodles & Squid Ink Beurre Blanc); Guest Judges: Maneet Chauhan (Quickfire challenge), Lynn Crawford (Elimination challenge)
54	5	"Retail Wars!"	April 30, 2017
Quickfire Challenge: The 8 chefs compete head-to-head to recreate a dish made by chef Daniel Boulud. They have 60 seconds to taste the dish while they are blindfolded and they have 30 minutes to cook it.; Top: Andrea, Jesse, Dustin, Trevor; Bottom: Nicole, Connie, Curtis, Dennis; WINNER: Andrea (Roasted Sablefish with Chorizo Peperonata); Elimination Challenge: The chefs are split into two teams, each team must create 8 dishes split between a hot table, cold window and an impulse purchase at the cash. The winning chef (from the winning team) receives $10,000.; WINNING TEAM: Nosh Urban Eatery (Curtis, Nicole, Trevor, Jesse); LOSING TEAM: Global Goods (Andrea, Dustin, Connie, Dennis); WINNER: Nicole (Panang Curry - Coconut Curried Beef with Brown Rice & Kaffir Lime Leaf and Pineapple Carrot Cake with Brown Butter Frosting ); ELIMINATED: Andrea (Seafood Salad - Octopus, Mussels & Shrimp with Potatoes & Arugula and Mozzarella-stuffed Veal Meatballs with Chili & Garlic Rapini); Guest Judges: Daniel Boulud (Quickfire challenge), Lidia Bastianich (Elimination challenge)
55	6	"Happy Birthday Canada!"	May 7, 2017
Quickfire Challenge: The chefs must create an appetizer featuring Krave Jerky.; Top: Dustin, Nicole, Trevor; Bottom: Jesse, Connie; WINNER: Nicole (Arancini with Sticky Rice & Jerky 4 Ways); Elimination Challenge: Create a dish inspired by a great moment in Canadian history.; WINNER: Dustin (Klondike Gold Rush - Cod Fritter Stuffed with Quail Egg, Baked Cod & Sea Buckthorn Vinaigrette); ELIMINATED: Curtis (Newfoundland Enters Confederation - Roasted Cod with Brandade Crust, Crab Salad, Lemon Hollandaise & Root Vegetables); Guest Judges: Josh Elkin (Quickfire challenge), Jeremy Charles (Elimination challenge)
56	7	"Ice Cream, You Scream, All Aboard!"	May 14, 2017
Quickfire Challenge: The chefs must choose three ingredients they like. After this, they are told that they must make an ice cream using the three ingredients they picked.; Top: Nicole, Trevor, Dustin; Bottom: Jesse, Dennis, Connie; WINNER: Dustin (Foie-Rero Rocher - Foie Gras & Hazelnut Ice Cream, Honey Roasted Plums & Balsamic); Elimination Challenge: Create a late-night snack and serve it to 100 guests in Lower Bay Station.; WINNER: Nicole (Shrimp Cake with Ginger Scallion Pistou, Rice & Coleslaw); ELIMINATED: Connie (Dill Pickle Chips with Sour Cream & Chive Dip, Topped with Salmon Roe & Horseradish); Guest Judges: Douglas Quint (Quickfire challenge), Grant van Gameren (Elimination challenge)
57	8	"Pleased to Deceive You"	May 21, 2017
Quickfire Challenge: The chefs must create a dish using the ingredients that have been chosen by their mentor.; Top: Dustin, Jesse, Dennis; Bottom: Nicole, Trevor; WINNER: Dennis (Annatto-crusted Pork Tenderloin with Coconut Caramel Dressing & Fennel Slaw); Elimination Challenge: Create two hors d'oeuvres that deceive the eye and serve them in a cocktail party to 75 guests.; WINNER: Trevor ("Scallops & Orange" - White Beets with Golden Beet Liquid Gel & Hazelnuts and "Spaghetti Bolognese" - Fried Mushroom Ragout with Deep-fried Potatoes & Parmesan); ELIMINATED: Jesse ("Beet Negroni" - Watermelon Compressed with Negroni & Beet Juice and "Carrot" - Chicken Farce with Buffalo Hot Sauce on Chicken Skin Crumble); Guest Judges: Antonio Park (Quickfire challenge), Derek Dammann (Elimination challenge)
58	9	"Final Four Showdown"	May 28, 2017
Quickfire Challenge: The chefs must create as many dishes as they can in 35 minutes. The dishes must meet Chef McEwan's standards and the chefs must utilize the GE Monogram oven for at least one component in each dish. The chefs were assisted by former winners of Top Chef Canada, Dale MacKay, Carl Heinrich, Matthew Stowe, and Rene Rodriguez.; Top: Dustin, Trevor (6 dishes); Bottom: Nicole, Dennis (3 dishes); WINNER: Trevor (Tomato Salad with Fresh Ricotta, Roasted Brussels Sprouts with Bacon, Chili Flakes & Parmesan, Spaghetti Squash Salad & Brown Butter Vinaigrette, Slow-cooked Salmon with Hollandaise & Roasted Asparagus, Baked Potato and Bison Striploin); Elimination Challenge: The chefs must create a great Canadian feast on the grill. They must feature classically Canadian wild game and pair them with two Top Chef quality accompaniments.; WINNER: Dustin (Venison - Grilled Venison with Birch-glazed Apples, Mustard & Apple Jus, Sweet & Sour Squash with Endive Salad, Brown-butter Hazelnuts & Pickled Onions and Potato Pavé with Morel & Porcini Mushroom & Bacon); ELIMINATED: Dennis (Bison - Whole Roasted Juniper & Cedar Bison Striploin, Grilled Cabbage with Onion Soubise, Soaked Bread & Melted Raclette and Grilled Asparagus, Smoked Wild Mushrooms & Creamed Leeks); Guest Judges: Normand Laprise (Elimination challenge)
59	10	"All-Stars Finale"	June 4, 2017
Quickfire Challenge: In an elimination Quickfire challenge, the chefs were charged with making the dish they’d want to eat before the day of battle, in 35 minutes.; Top: Dustin, Nicole; Bottom, and Eliminated: Trevor; WINNER: Dustin - Fennel-Poached Salmon with Fingerling Potatoes, Braised Carrot and Fennel; ELIMINATED: Trevor - Handmade Tagliatelle; Elimination Challenge: Create a gigantic five-course feast, with the assistance of Toronto area former competitors Andrea Nicholson and Dennis Tay .; WINNER: Nicole - Lemon Arancini with Truffle Fonduta, Beef Carpaccio, Goat Cheese Tortellini with Peas and Pancetta, Sea Bream with Fingerling Potatoes, Crispy Capers, and Beurre Blanc Sauce, Vanilla Bean Panna Cotta; ELIMINATED: Dustin - Braised Winter Melon, Thai Mango Salad with Iced Ginger Dressing, Olive Oil-Poached Cod, Japanese Rib Eye Steak with Miso Eggplant, Vegetable Tempura and Nori Squid Ink Butter, Apple Tarte Tatin with Vanilla Ice Cream; Original Airdate: June 4, 2017
