= Top Chef Canada season 8 =

Canadian television show season

Top Chef Canada
- Season 8
- No. of contestants: 12
- Winner: Francis Blais
- No. of episodes: 8

Release
- Original network: Food Network
- Original release: April 13 – June 1, 2020

Season chronology
- ← Previous; Season 7 Next → Season 9

The eighth season of the Canadian reality competition show Top Chef Canada was broadcast on Food Network in Canada. It is the Canadian spin-off of Bravo's hit show Top Chef. The program takes place in Toronto, and is hosted by Eden Grinshpan. Season eight features 12 chefs of various backgrounds considered to be the next generation of culinary stars in Canada. The final challenge was held at the historic Elora Mill in Elora, Ontario, with shopping done at the St. Jacobs Farmers' Market in St. Jacobs, Ontario.

== Contestants ==
12 chefs competed in season 8. Contestants are listed in the alphabetical order of their surnames.

- Francis Blais, 27, Chef de Cuisine, Montreal, QC
- Brock Bowes, 41, Chef/Food Truck Owner, Kelowna, BC
- Dominique Dufour, 32, Chef/Restaurant Owner, Ottawa, ON
- Adrian Forte, 31, Chef Consultant, Toronto, ON
- Shaun Hussey, 40, Chef/Deli Owner, St. Johns, NL
- Xin Mao, 36, Chef/Bistro and Bar Owner, Vancouver, BC
- Lucy Morrow, 26, Executive Chef, Charlottetown, PE
- Jo Notkin, 43, Catering Chef, Montreal, QC
- Stephanie Ogilvie, 36, Chef de Cuisine, Halifax, NS
- Elycia Ross, 27, Chef/Food Truck Owner, Calgary, AB
- Nils Schneider, 27, Pastry Chef, Calgary, AB
- Imrun Texeira, 25, Sous Chef, Ottawa, ON

== Contestant Progress ==
No.	Contestant	1	2	3	4	5	6	7	8
No.	Quickfire; Winner(s)	Francis^{1}	Stephanie	Francis	Jo	Xin	Imrun	Stephanie	—
1	Francis	IMM^{1}	WIN	HIGH	HIGH	WIN	HIGH	WIN	WINNER
2	Lucy	HIGH	HIGH	IN	LOW	WIN	WIN	HIGH	RUNNER-UP
2	Stephanie	IMM^{1}	HIGH	HIGH	WIN	WIN	LOW	LOW^{2}	RUNNER-UP
4	Imrun	IN	LOW	LOW	IN	LOW	LOW	OUT^{2}	
5	Adrian	HIGH	IN	IN	LOW	WIN	HIGH	OUT	
6	Jo	IN	IN	WIN	IN	IN	OUT		
7	Dominique	LOW	IN	IN	HIGH	OUT			
7	Xin	IMM^{1}	IN	IN	IN	OUT			
9	Elycia	WIN	IN	LOW	OUT				
10	Nils	IMM^{1}	LOW	OUT					
11	Shaun	LOW	OUT						
12	Brock	OUT							

^Note 1: The top four of this quickfire were exempt from cooking during this elimination challenge.
^Note 2: Stephanie and Imrun were involved in a cook-off for the last place in the finals which took place in episode 8. Stephanie won which meant that Imrun was eliminated.

(WINNER) The chef won the season and was crowned Top Chef.
(RUNNER-UP) The chef was a runner-up for the season.
(WIN) The chef won that episode's Elimination Challenge.
(HIGH) The chef was selected as one of the top entries in the Elimination Challenge, but did not win.
(IMMUNE) The chef was immune from elimination, and exempted from cooking during this Elimination Challenge.
(LOW) The chef was selected as one of the bottom entries in the Elimination Challenge, but was not eliminated.
(OUT) The chef lost that week's Elimination Challenge and was out of the competition.
(IN) The chef neither won nor lost that week's Elimination Challenge. They also were not up to be eliminated.

== Episodes ==
No. overall	No. in season	Title	Original release date
76	1	"A Dish for a New Decade"	April 13, 2020
Quickfire Challenge: The chefs were greeted by host Eden Grinshpan and head judge Mark McEwan before being tasked to cook their "desert island meal," a dish that they could eat every day. The top four chefs in the challenge received immunity from elimination and didn't have to cook in the following elimination challenge, plus got to taste all the contestants dishes in the following challenge as well as a live feed to watch the judge taste and critique the dishes.: WINNER: Francis (Fresh Pasta Glazed in Miso Sauce with Maitake Mushrooms); Note: Stephanie, Xin, and Nils were also picked to have immunity but Francis had the overall winning dish from the challenge. Elimination Challenge: The losing chefs from the Quickfire Challenge were tasked with creating a dish that reflects the future of the culinary industry in Canada. The chefs cooked and served their dishes at the Civic Restaurant at the Broadview Hotel in downtown Toronto.: WINNER: Elycia ("Rabbit in the Garden." Cornmeal Fried Rabbit with Compressed Vegetables and Beet & Goat Cheese Puree); ELIMINATED: Brock (Pan-Seared & Sous Vide Rack of Lamb with Hollandaise, Vanilla & Celery Root Puree and Duck Fat Confit Potatoes)
77	2	"It's a BBQ Party"	April 20, 2020
Quickfire Challenge: The chefs randomly selected a classic dish and were tasked to deconstruct it into a hot and cold element. Each dish would have at least two chefs competing against each other and the judges would pick the best dish from each group. Elicia got "chef's choice" and could compete with any group she wanted. The guest judge for this challenge was chef and restaurant owner Patrick Kriss. The winner received a $3000 (CAD) prize from Crest toothpaste.: OVERALL WINNER: Stephanie (Tuna Tartare with Sherry-Pickled Potatoes, Beans, Tomatoes and Capers); Elimination Challenge: The chefs were tasked to create a main and side dish inspired by one country's style of barbecue. The chefs remained in the same groups as the Quickfire Challenge and would cook head to head using the same cuisine. They served their dishes to 100 people and the judging panel at Black Creek Community Farm and were joined by guest judges and professional butchers Erica Nakamura and Jocelyn Guest.: TEAM INDIA: Nils and Stephanie; TEAM U.S.A.: Imrun, Adrian and Elycia; TEAM TURKEY: Francis and Xin; TEAM KOREA: Dominique and Shaun; TEAM BRAZIL: Jo and Lucy; The judges would choose their three favorite dishes from across all cuisines to highlight at Judges' Table.: WINNER: Francis (Lamb Kebab with Flatbread, Grilled Vegetable Salad. Hummus and Grilled Lemon); ELIMINATED: Shaun (Garlic Miso Chicken Thigh Ssam with Pickled Radish, Kimchi, and Spicy Tofu Soup)
78	3	"Grab and Go!"	April 27, 2020
Quickfire Challenge: The chefs went head to head in a culinary skills race using Prince Edward Island ingredients. Each round used a different skill and the first number of chefs to finish would proceed to the next round. (first 6 in the first round, first 4 in the second round) The challenges included peeling 10 apples, shucking 25 oysters, and removing as much meat from 4 lobsters in 90 seconds. The top two chefs from the lobster round would use all the ingredients they prepped to create an amuse bouche. The overall winner from the amuse-bouche round would receive a cash prize of $5000 (CAD).: WINNER: Francis (Grilled Lobster & Apple Skewer on Oyster Emulsion); Elimination Challenge: The chefs were tasked to create a pop-up restaurant featuring a cohesive menu of convenient, grab-and-go dishes. Each chef would make their own dishes and would be judged individually. The chefs cooked and served their food at Stackt outdoor market space in central Toronto to 100 guests and were joined by guest judge and James Beard award winner Joanne Chang. The winner of the challenge received a $5000 (CAD) cash prize from Interac.: WINNER: Jo ("Jewel Box" Brownie with Chestnut Cream, Candied Hazelnuts, Orange, Pumpkin Seeds, and Cocoa Nibs); ELIMINATED: Nils (Chinese Wheat Noodles in Soy, Sesame & Oyster Sauce with Duck Pastrami, Orange Zest & Cilantro)
79	4	"Drag Brunch"	May 4, 2020
Quickfire Challenge: The chefs were divided into teams of three and were tasked to create a luxurious three course brunch tasting menu. The chefs were joined by two drag queens as guest judges.: WINNERS: Jo, Dominique, Adrian; OVERALL BEST DISH: Jo (Carrot Cake Scone with Whipped Cream Cheese Frosting and Candied Walnuts); Elimination Challenge: The chefs were randomly paired with a European travel destination and course (appetizer, main course, etc.) and were tasked to create a dish inspired by that destination. The chefs cooked and served their dishes at Estia restaurant in downtown Toronto and were joined by restaurateur and Air Transat gourmet chef Daniel Vezina. The winner of the challenge received an all-expense-paid flight for two to any European Air Transat destination.: WINNER: Stephanie (Glasgow, Appetizer- Lamb Sausage with Barley Risotto, Brussels Sprout Slaw and Root Vegetable Oat Crumble); ELIMINATED: Elycia (Athens, Appetizer- Spanakopita, Marinated Mediterranean Vegetables, and Lemon Oregano Whipped Potatoes)
80	5	"Castle Cook-Off"	May 11, 2020
Quickfire Challenge: The chefs selected a category of European ingredients (cheese, meats, fruits & vegetables or confectionaries) and were tasked with creating a dish that features a product from the category they picked. The winner of the challenge received $5000 (CAD) to spend on European ingredients. The guest judge for this challenge was Michelin starred chef and international culinary icon Daniel Boulud.: WINNER: Xin (Truffles, Italy- Sourdough with Fermented Bean Curd Mousse, Crème Fraiche and Shaved Truffles); Elimination Challenge: The chefs competed in the classic Top Chef challenge "Restaurant Wars." The chefs were divided into teams of four and were tasked to create a pop-up restaurant with a cohesive concept and several dishes. The chefs served their meals to 60 guests at the iconic Casa Loma restaurant in Toronto's historic district. As the winners of the Quickfire Challenge and the previous episode's Elimination challenge, Stephanie and Xin were selected as team captains, and got to pick their teams schoolyard style. The guest judges for the challenge were restaurateurs, Rob Katz and Kevin Boehm. It's revealed that this challenge is a double elimination and two chefs from the losing team will be sent home. Team Northern Roots: TEAM CAPTAIN: Stephanie; FRONT OF HOUSE: Adrian; Stephanie, Adrian, Lucy, Francis Team Octo: TEAM CAPTAIN: Xin; FRONT OF HOUSE: Jo; Xin, Jo, Dominique, Imrun Northern Root's Menu: Ham Consommé with Peas and Grilled Bread with Guanciale (Francis, Appetizer); Scallops with Fried Dulse and Brunoised Radish & Apple. (Lucy, Appetizer); Wild Pacific Salmon and Smoked Potato Pave in Charred Herb Sauce (Francis, Main Dish); Bison & Oxtail Stew with White Bean Puree, Confit Mushrooms, Carrots and Crispy Shallots (Adrian, Main Dish); Sea Buckthorn Curd with Short Crust, White Chocolate Cremeux, and Meringue (Stephanie, Dessert); Parsnip Cake, Poached Pears and Sour Cream Frozen Yogurt (Stephanie, Dessert); Octo's Menu: Bone Marrow with Rye, Nut & Seed Crumble and Warm Vegetable Salad (Dominique, Appetizer); Cured Atlantic Salmon in Dashi Brodo (Imrun, Appetizer); Salted-Egg Yolk and Spot Prawn Linguine (Xin, Main Dish); Pork Belly with Apples and Mashed Potatoes (Dominique, Main Dish); Torta Di Mascarpone with Gorgonzola, Honey, Oranges, Almonds and Peach Conserve. (Jo, Dessert); Chocolate Tart with Salted-Spiced Honey and Linden Flower Whipped Cream (Jo, Dessert); WINNING TEAM: Northern Roots: Stephanie, Adrian, Francis, and Lucy; LOSING TEAM: Octo: Xin, Jo, Imrun, and Dominique; ELIMINATED: Dominique and Xin
81	6	"Bring the Funk"	May 18, 2020
Quickfire Challenge: The chefs were tasked with creating a dish using a fermented ingredient. They could choose from Ruby Sauerkraut, Razor Clam Garum, Gochujang, Ginger Chickpea Shoyu, Pumpkin Seed Miso or Daikon Kimchi. The guest judge for this challenge was fermentation expert and culinary director at the world renown restaurant Noma, David Zilber.: WINNER: Imrun (Fried Mushroom, Charred Orange, and Gochujang Glazed Sticky Peanuts); Elimination Challenge: The chefs were tasked to create a dish featuring an ingredient from one of Prince Edward Island's 6 regions. The chefs served their dishes at Rodney's Oyster House, a restaurant known for its fresh seafood fare. The guest judges for this challenge were Noma culinary director David Zilber and oyster shucking champion Eamon Clark.: WINNER: Lucy (Crispy Fried & Marinated Mussels, Roasted Brussels Sprouts, Black Garlic Aioli, and Burnt Honey); ELIMINATED: Jo (Crispy Oyster, Lardons, Fried Potatoes, Kale Salad with Buttermilk Dressing and Oyster Crackers)
82	7	"Eat Your Veggies"	May 25, 2020
Quickfire Challenge: The chefs were paired with youth from across Canada and tasked with taking a random vegetable and transforming it into a sweet dessert. The guest judge for this challenge was host of Food Network's Junior Chef Showdown and Canadian food icon Lynn Crawford. The winner received a $5000 (CAD) donation to Kid Food Nation in their name.: WINNER: Stephanie and Tyler (Broccoli Fritter with Broccoli Crème Anglaise & Caramelized White Chocolate.); Elimination Challenge: The chefs were tasked with creating a pasta dish with pasta made from scratch. The chefs each chose a different variety of pasta to work with. The chefs cooked and served their food at La Palma restaurant in Toronto. The guest judge for this challenge was restaurant owner and Top Chef Canada Season 3 finalist Danny Smiles. It's revealed that this challenge is a double elimination and two chefs will be sent home.: WINNER: Francis (Orecchiette in Broccoli Sauce with Crunchy Broccoli Stems, fried Spelt Grains, and Asiago Emulsion); ELIMINATED: Adrian (Butternut Squash Tagliatelle with butternut Béchamel & Scotch Bonnet Cremini Mushrooms); At the judges' table, the judges announce Francis and Lucy had the best dishes and they can both move on. The judges proceed to eliminate Adrian. The episode ends in a cliffhanger as Eden asks Stephanie and Imrun to unpack their knives.
83	8	"Final Showdown"	June 1, 2020
Sudden Death Cookoff: The judges reveal that deciding between Imrun's and Stephanie's dishes from the previous episode was too difficult. They give them thirty minutes to create any dish they like to prove why they should move into the finale of Top Chef Canada Season 8.: WINNER: Stephanie (Seared Scallops, Carmelized Cauliflower Puree, Beluga Lentil Fricassee and Asparagus Salad); ELIMINATED Imrun (Beef Vindaloo Tartare on Crispy Nori Cracker with Black Cardamom Mayo); Final Challenge: The final three chefs were tasked with cooking a four-course progressive menu to show their style and personality on a plate and why they should be crowned Canada's Top Chef. The chefs cooked and presented their dishes at the Elora Mill Hotel & Spa. The chefs were presented with colleagues, family members, and friends from home to help design, execute and plate their dishes. The chefs also had time to shop at local farmer's markets to help gather ingredients before the big cook. Francis's Meal: AMUSE BOUCHE: Tomato Broth with Celery Oil & Dried Tomatoes and Clam Tart with Clam Garum & Rose Oil; APPETIZER: Grilled Lobster with Fried Ginger, Puffed Wild Rice, and Rhubarb Root Oil; MAIN COURSE: Pithivier with Pigeon Breast & Foie Gras Wrapped in Spinach, Foie Gras Pigeon Jus and Pigeon Consommé; DESSERT: Buttermilk Mouse with Spiced Cookie, Wild Roses, Plums and Black Currant Wood Oil; Stephanie's Meal: AMUSE BOUCHE: Celery Root Chip with Cured Salmon, Roe, Cucumber Tartare, and Begonia Flowers; APPETIZER: Rye Gnocchi in Sea Truffle Butter with Carrot Demi-Glace Asparagus and Beef Bresaola; MAIN COURSE: Honey-Lacquered Duck Breast with Sunchoke Pave and Fermented Radicchio; DESSERT: Tiramisu with Mushrooms and 'Dulse De Leche'; Lucy's Meal: AMUSE BOUCHE: Lemon Horseradish Aioli, Potato Fried Oyster, and Dulse Crumble; APPETIZER: Toasted Bread with Schmaltz, Semi-Dried & Marinated Tomatoes, Mozzarella, and Pig's Neck; MAIN DISH: Molasses & Black Rum-Marinated Rabbit Loin with Wilted Greens and Cashew Sauce; DESSERT: Apple Pie with Miso Maple Semifreddo and Bitter Pecans; The judges deliberate on who of the three should be crowned Canada's next Top Chef.: SECOND RUNNER UP: Lucy; RUNNER UP: Stephanie; TOP CHEF: Francis Francis was named Canada's 8th Top Chef. He is the only contestant in Top Chef Canada history to never be on the bottom of an Elimination Challenge but also the only contestant to have always been on the top in every elimination challenge. (Excluding the first Elimination Challenge where he had immunity and didn't have to cook.)
