= Top Chef Canada season 6 =

Top Chef Canada
- Season 6
- No. of contestants: 11
- Winner: Ross Larkin
- No. of episodes: 8

Release
- Original network: Food Network
- Original release: April 8 – May 28, 2018

Season chronology
- ← Previous; Season 5 Next → Season 7

The sixth season of the Canadian reality competition show Top Chef Canada was broadcast on Food Network in Canada. It is the Canadian spin-off of Bravo's hit show Top Chef. The program takes place in Toronto, and is hosted by Eden Grinshpan. Season six features 11 young chefs considered to be the next generation of culinary stars.

== Contestants ==
11 chefs competed in season 6. Contestants are listed in the order they were eliminated.

- Felix Zhou, 29, Coquitlam, BC
- Ivana Raca, 33, Toronto, ON
- Elia Herrera, 37, Toronto, ON
- Jesse Zuber, 29, Saskatoon, SK
- Matt Sullivan, 34, Toronto, ON
- Darren Rogers, 27, Montreal, QC
- Nathan Guggenheimer, 35, Saskatoon, SK
- Jean-Phillipe "JP" Miron, 30, Montreal, QC
- Jinhee Lee, 38, Calgary, AB
- Mark Singson, 29, Vancouver, BC
- Ross Larkin, 31, St. John's, NL

== Contestant Progress ==
| No. | Contestant | 1 | 2 | 3 | 4 | 5 | 6 | 7 | 8 |
| No. | Quickfire; Winner(s) | Mark | Ross^{1} | Matt | Matt | Matt | Jinhee | Nathan | Mark |
| 1 | Ross | IN | IN | LOW | LOW | LOW^{2} | WIN | HIGH | WINNER |
| 2 | Mark | IN | HIGH | IN | LOW | LOW^{2} | LOW | WIN | RUNNER-UP |
| 3 | Jinhee | WIN | IN | IN | HIGH | WIN | IN | HIGH | OUT |
| 3 | JP | HIGH | LOW | WIN | HIGH | HIGH | LOW | LOW | OUT |
| 5 | Nathan | LOW | OUT | | HIGH^{3} | WIN | HIGH | WD^{4} | |
| 6 | Darren | LOW | HIGH | LOW | HIGH | HIGH | OUT | | |
| 7 | Matt | IN | WIN | HIGH | WIN | OUT | | | |
| 7 | Jesse | IN | IN | IN | LOW | OUT | | | |
| 9 | Elia | HIGH | IN | HIGH | OUT | | | | |
| 10 | Ivana | IN | LOW | OUT | | | | | |
| 11 | Felix | OUT | | | OUT^{3} | | | | |

^Note 1: The winner received immunity, which could be used at any time in the next four rounds.
^Note 2: Ross used his immunity to save himself and Mark from elimination
^Note 3: Nathan and Felix were brought back in the fourth episode; because the team with Nathan won the challenge, he was able to stay in the competition
^Note 4: Feeling dissatisfied with his level of cooking throughout the competition and struggling mentally, Nathan withdrew from the competition

(WINNER) The chef won the season and was crowned Top Chef.
(RUNNER-UP) The chef was a runner-up for the season.
(WIN) The chef won that episode's Elimination Challenge.
(HIGH) The chef was selected as one of the top entries in the Elimination Challenge, but did not win.
(LOW) The chef was selected as one of the bottom entries in the Elimination Challenge, but was not eliminated.
(OUT) The chef lost that week's Elimination Challenge and was out of the competition.
(IN) The chef neither won nor lost that week's Elimination Challenge. They also were not up to be eliminated.
(WITHDREW) The chef withdrew from the competition.

== Episodes ==
| No. overall | No. in season | Title | Original release date |
|---|---|---|---|
| 60 | 1 | "The Next Wave" | April 8, 2018 |
The chefs got a short introduction before being thrown directly into their first Quickfire Challenge. Quickfire Challenge: A four-part "culinary skills" challenge led by Mark McEwan.: Round 1: Peeling pearl onions. The first 7 chefs to finish advanced.; Round 2: Peeled and diced butternut squash. The best performing 4 chefs advanced.; Round 3: Breaking down a duck. The first two to finish advanced.; Round 4: The two remaining chefs were given 25 minutes to prepare a dish from the ingredients prepared in the first three rounds.; WINNER: Mark (Pan-Roasted Duck with Charred Onions, Squash Puree & Smoked Canola Oil); Elimination Challenge: The chefs must create a dish inspired by a signature dish from one of four guest chefs and judges. The four chefs were McEwan (Bymark Burger), Susur Lee (Curry Roasted Chicken), Rob Feenie (Sake & Maple-Cured Sablefish, Braised Oxtail, Ginger and Soy Cream), and Anne Yarymowich (Montreal classic Tourtière).: WINNER: Jinhee (Maple Lime-Glazed Chicken Thigh with Lemongrass Curry); ELIMINATED: Felix (Duck, Bison & Venison Mince with Pickled Root Vegetables & Crispy Potatoes); Guest judges: Susur Lee, Rob Feenie, Anne Yarymowich, Mijune Pak, Chris Nuttall-Smith and Janet Zuccarini (elimination only)
| 61 | 2 | "What Came First…The Chicken or the Immunity?" | April 15, 2018 |
Quickfire Challenge: Each chef was given the same ingredients and 40 minutes to make a dish with as little food waste as possible. The winner would get the season's only immunity, to be used at any point in the successive four episodes.: WINNER: Ross (Pan-Seared Branzino in a Pesto Puree with Compressed Radish & Artichoke Vinegar); Elimination Challenge: The chefs were assigned to create a dish inspired by one of Canada's major farm exports: dairy, egg, vegetable, fruit or grain.: WINNER: Matt (Beer-Braised Savoury Grain Stew with Rye-Marinated Duck); ELIMINATED: Nathan (Poached Egg with Hollandaise, Trout Eggs & Cured Salmon on Roasted Cabbage); Guest judges: Danny Bowien (quickfire only), Lynn Crawford and five farmers (elimination only)
| 62 | 3 | "Qué Rico" | April 22, 2018 |
Quickfire Challenge: The chefs are tasked with combining two food trends (one ingredient and one presentation style) to create a new dish.: WINNER: Matt (Kimchi Foie Gras Dumpling in Kimchi Broth With Grated Shitake Mushroom); Elimination Challenge: Chefs were tasked to help create a three-course Mexican meal, based on one of four regions of Mexico. Each course will be prepared by three of the chefs.: WINNER: JP (Mango Custard, Guava Sorbet, Goat's Milk Ice Cream with Dulce de Leche); ELIMINATED: Ivana (Avocado Chocolate Ice Cream with Churro Crumble, Avocado Mousse, Dehydrated Fig & Fried Cricket); Guest judges: Peter Meehan (quickfire only), Carlos Gaytan (elimination only)
| 63 | 4 | "Restaurant Wars!" | April 29, 2018 |
Quickfire Challenge: Each chef had to teach a culinary student how to make their signature dish without being able to see the student's progress.: WINNER: Matt (Gochujang-Marinated Ribeye with Burnt Cauliflower and Mint Puree); Elimination Challenge: "Restaurant Wars", where the chefs are split into teams and must run a successful "restaurant". Two of the three eliminated chefs are picked to round out each team, with the winning team member able to re-enter the competition.: Team 1: Matt (captain), Darren, JP, Jinhee, Nathan; Team 2: Ross (captain), Elia, Mark, Jesse, Felix; WINNER: Matt (Red Fife Noodles with Lobster Dashi, Bacon & Salmon Roe); ELIMINATED: Elia (Flourless Chocolate Torte with Mango Ice Cream), + Felix (front of house); Guest judges: Ruth Reichl (elimination only)
| 64 | 5 | "Double Overtime" | May 6, 2018 |
Quickfire Challenge: Chefs were tasked to randomly selects two spices and make a dessert.: WINNER: Matt (Sriracha Beignets, Burnt Orange Jalapeno Ice Cream and Caramelized Banana With Bone Marrow Caramel); Elimination Challenge: At an ice hockey arena, the chefs are paired together based on the "iconic" Canadian food they had randomly chosen: pork, beef, lobster and salmon. Each pair must make "stadium food".: WINNER: Jinhee (Pork & Tiger Prawn Dumplings with Chili Peach Mango Chutney) + Nathan (Soy-Braised Pork Belly with Fried Rice & Saskatoon Berries); ELIMINATED: Jesse (Salmon Tartare with Salmon Roe, Cilatro, Wasabi Peas, Crispy Wontons & Caviar) + Matt (Bibimbap with Baked Salmon, Barley, Pickled Shiitake Mushrooms & Edamame); Guest judge: Rob Gentile (quickfire only)
| 65 | 6 | "That’s a Whole Lotta Dough!" | May 13, 2018 |
Quickfire Challenge: Chefs were tasked to create Top Chef Canada quality fried chicken with an accompanying side dish.: WINNER: Jinhee (Fried Chicken with Anchovy Glaze and Mango, Carrots and Compressed Cucumber); Elimination Challenge: Chefs were tasked to pick a country randomly and create a pizza inspired by its traditional cuisine, as well as several appropriate side dishes.: WINNER: Ross (Germany- Speck, Onion, Mushroom & Gruyere Pizza with Potato Salad & Sweet Fried Rye Bread); ELIMINATED: Darren (Sweden- Poached Prawn, Anchovy & Chanterelle Pizza with Swedish Meatballs & Pickled Mackerel); Guest judge: Nicole Gomes (quickfire only), Evan Funke (elimination only)
| 66 | 7 | "Wine of the Tiger" | May 20, 2018 |
Quickfire Challenge: Chefs were tasked to create a vegan version of a classic French dish.: WINNER: Nathan (Champignons Au Vin- Roasted Maitake Mushrooms with Portobello & Porcini Mushrooms & Root Vegetables); Elimination Challenge: Chefs were tasked to create a canapé and pair it with a Beringer wine.: WINNER: Mark (Kilawin- Ahi Tune with XO Sauce, Cilantro Jus, Apple Kombu Relish, Crispy Nori & Smoked Oil); ELIMINATED: Nathan (withdrew from competition); Guest judge: Amanda Cohen (quickfire only), Dustin Gallagher (elimination only)
| 67 | 8 | "Finale Four Ways" | May 27, 2018 |
Quickfire Challenge (double elimination): Recreate a dish that had failed in a previous round and improve it.: WINNER: Mark (Roasted Lamb Saddle with Bread Emulsion, Blistered Tomatoes & Apricot Relish); ELIMINATED: JP (Ravioli in Brodo- Chicken & Chicken Liver Stuffed Ravioli in Clarified Broth) + Jinhee (Birch Shrub & Lemongrass-Marinated Duck with Coconut Red Curry & Frozen Foie Gras); Final Challenge: A five-course meal putting the chef's "personality on a plate," and proven why they are deserving of the title of Canada's next Top Chef.: WINNER: Ross (moose heart tartare, whelk skewer and cod chitlin with capelin gold leaf; sea urchin and torn diver scallop with dashi and dried seaweed; skin on pan-roasted cod with onion soubise, charred onions, leek and sea urchin beurre blanc; wild hare and partridge with partridge heart, artichoke purée, winter chanterelles and glazed beet; roasted parsnip cream with parsnip chip, whisky-compressed apples and creeping snowberries); RUNNER-UP: Mark (kusshi oyster with dill oil, smoked crème fraîche and pickled shallots; beef tartare with charcoal mayonnaise, tomato bacon jam, iceberg lettuce and toasted bread; cured tuna with truffle soy, cilantro relish, crispy nori, salted cucumber and shaved white truffles; seared duck and scallop with rose petal xo, bbq jus and fried rice; Halo-halo with coconut sorbet, pandan syrup, coconut and grassroot jelly, toasted coconut and crushed iced tea)
