= Top Chef Canada season 7 =

Canadian television show season

Top Chef Canada
- Season 7
- No. of contestants: 14
- Winner: Paul Moran
- No. of episodes: 8

Release
- Original network: Food Network
- Original release: April 1 – May 20, 2019

Season chronology
- ← Previous; Season 6 Next → Season 8

The seventh season of the Canadian reality competition show Top Chef Canada was broadcast on Food Network in Canada. It is the Canadian spin-off of Bravo's hit show Top Chef. The program takes place in Toronto, and is hosted by Eden Grinshpan. Season seven features 14 chefs of various backgrounds considered to be the next generation of culinary stars in Canada.

== Contestants ==
14 chefs competed in season 8. Contestants are listed in the alphabetical order of their surnames.

- Tania Ganassini, 31, Chef/Owner Staff Meal, Niagara on the Lake, ON
- Takeshi Horinoue, 37, Chef/Partner Lavandaria Restaurant, Montreal, QC
- Benet Hunt, 28, Executive Chef Ayden Kitchen & Bar, Saskatoon, Saskatchewan
- Hayden Johnston, 29, Chef De Cuisine Richmond Station, Thunder Bay, Ontario, ON
- Sebastien LaFramboise, 31, Executive Chef District Saint-Joseph, Quebec City, QC
- Renée Lavallée, 43, Chef/Owner The Canteen & Little C, Dartmouth,
- Paul Moran, 31, Executive Chef Tofino Resort & Marina, Tofino, BC
- Dennis Peckham, 41, Chef/Owner Fraiche Sheet Foods, Port Moody, BC
- Phil Scarfone, 33, Head Chef Nightingale, Vancouver, BC
- Erin Smith, 32, Executive Sous Chef, Toronto, ON
- Max Straczek, 32, Executive Chef, Vancouver, BC
- Wallace Wong, 27, Chef/Owner Six Pack Chef, Mississauga, ON

== Contenders ==
- Alexei Boldireff, 25, Executive Chef Baijiu, Edmonton, Alberta
- Paul Kim, 33, Chef/Owner Doma, Toronto, ON

== Contestant progress ==
No.	Contestant	1	2	3	4	5	6	7	8
No.	Quickfire; Winner(s)	Benet^{1}	Sébastien	—N/a	Phil^{2}	Renée	Wallace	Phil	Paul M.
1	Paul M.	WIN	WIN	LOW	HIGH	LOW	HIGH	WIN	WINNER
2	Phil	HIGH	HIGH	WIN	LOW	LOW	HIGH	HIGH	RUNNER-UP
3	Hayden	LOW	IN	LOW	WIN	LOW	LOW	LOW	OUT
3	Wallace	HIGH	HIGH	LOW	IN	WIN	WIN	LOW	OUT
5	Renée	HIGH	IN	WIN	LOW	LOW	HIGH	OUT	
6	Benet	LOW	IN	WIN	HIGH	WIN	OUT		
7	Dennis	IN	HIGH	LOW	IN	OUT			
7	Sébastien	IN	LOW	WIN	HIGH	OUT			
9	Tania	IN	IN	WIN	OUT				
10	Max	IN	LOW	OUT					
11	Erin	LOW	OUT						
12	Takeshi	OUT							
13	Alexei	OUT^{1}							
13	Paul K.	OUT^{1}							

^Note 1: These three chefs were brought as "competitors" in episode 1 to find the final member of the cast. Benet cooked his way into the competition, while Alexei and Paul K. were eliminated.
^Note 2: Phil won immunity in this quickfire and was automatically safe from elimination.

(Winner) The chef won the season and was crowned Top Chef.
(Runner-Up) The chef was a runner-up for the season.
(Win) The chef won that episode's Elimination Challenge.
(High) The chef was selected as one of the top entries in the Elimination Challenge, but did not win.
(Immune) The chef was immune from elimination, and exempted from cooking during this Elimination Challenge.
(Low) The chef was selected as one of the bottom entries in the Elimination Challenge, but was not eliminated.
(Out) The chef lost that week's Elimination Challenge and was out of the competition.
(In) The chef neither won nor lost that week's Elimination Challenge. They also were not up to be eliminated.

== Episodes ==
No. overall	No. in season	Title	Original release date
68	1	"The Contenders"	April 1, 2019
Quickfire Challenge: The 11 chefs were greeted by host Eden Grinshpan and head judge Mark McEwan before being informed that the search for the final cast wasn't over yet. Three contenders, who were candidates for the cast would cook their signature dish in an attempt to join the season. In another twist, the 11 other chefs were tasked with choosing who of the three would make it into the competition by judging each of their dishes as a team.: Winner: Benet (Dry Aged Beef with Cauliflower Purée, Cauliflower Croquette, Verjus, and Poached Bone Marrow); Eliminated: Alexei (Ginger and Apple Pork Dumpling with Buttermilk Squash and Five-Spice Purée); Eliminated: Paul K. (Poached Halibut in Korean Seaweed Stock); Elimination Challenge: The chefs were tasked with taking a recipe handed down to them from a loved one and reimagining it into a Top Chef quality dish. Because he won his way into the competition, Benet was immune from elimination. The chefs cooked and presented their dishes to the judging panel at Akira Back Restaurant in downtown Toronto. It was announced that the winner of this challenge would win an all-expense-paid trip to Berringer Vineyards in Napa Valley.: Winner: Paul M.(Chicken & Foie Gras Stuffed Morel Mushrooms with Morel & Chicken Broth); Eliminated: Takeshi (Chicken Mousse-Stuffed Ballotine with Petit Pois and Fava Beans in Chicken Dashi)
69	2	"Bring On the Mimosas Baby"	April 8, 2019
Quickfire Challenge: The chefs were tasked with creating a Top Chef quality breakfast or brunch dish that could be easily eaten in bed. The guest judge for this challenge restaurant owner and chef Suzanne Barr. It is announced that the chef with the best dish would receive a $5000 (CAD) cash prize from Cuisinart.: Winner: Sébastien (Potato Galette with Smoked Salmon, Quail Egg, Caramelized Bacon & Fruit Ketchup); Elimination Challenge: The chefs were met by head Air Transat chef Daniel Vezina and tasked with creating their ideal in-flight airplane meal. The chefs were asked to present all their dishes' components as an entire plate for reference, but reimagine it entirely into an hors d'oeuvre for tasting. The chefs cooked and presented their dishes to 100 people and the judging panel at Toronto's Fermenting Cellar event space. It is announced the chef with the best hors d'oeuvre will win an all expense paid, first class flight to anywhere Air Transat flies.: Winner: Paul M (Yuzu & White Soy-Marinated Tuna with Chayote, Crispy Puffed Black Rice); Eliminated: Erin (Sea Bream Crudo with Yuzu Peach Purée & Fingerling Potato Chips)
70	3	"Restaurant Wars"	April 15, 2019
Note: Because of Restaurant Wars there was no Quickfire Challenge. Elimination Challenge: The chefs competed in the classic Top Chef challenge "Restaurant Wars." The chefs were split into two teams and tasked with creating a fluent theme concept and menu, as well as conducting a restaurant service with several guests, plus the judging panel. Because Paul M. won the previous episode's Elimination Challenge he was named team captain and got to also pick the opposing team's captain. He choose Benet. To determine the order in which the captain's would select their team, Paul M. and Benet went head to head in a mise-en-place skills race. The chef who won the round got to pick first, followed by the loser of that round. Benet won all the rounds, thus getting an advantage in picking his team. The guest judge for this challenge was renown food critic Adam Platt. The chefs had 20 minutes to brainstorm before shopping and serving their guest at restaurant 360, an eatery positioned 11,000 feet above ground in the CN Tower. It is announced the winning Restaurant Wars team would receive a $5000 (CAD) cash prize. Benet's Team (Lake): Phil; Sébastien; Tania (Front of house); Renee; Paul's Team (Culmina): Denis (Front of house); Hayden; Wallace; Max; Culmina's Menu: Yukon Gold Potato Tortellini in Pine Mushroom Broth (Paul, Appetizer); Lobster and Tamago Maki with Calabrian Chile Aioli (Paul, Appetizer); Branzino in Japanese Minestrone with Sake, Carrot & Yuzu Puree (Denis, Main Course); Roasted Veal Loin with Confit Potato And Soy Truffle Jus (Hayden, Main Course); Pistachio Cookie & Cream with Umeboshi Plum (Wallace, Dessert); Taleggio in Toasted Brioche with Asian Pear Puree and Matcha (Max, Dessert); Lake's Menu: Sunflower Custard and Dukkah with Watercress Salad (Tania, Appetizer); Cured Arctic Char with Confit Beet and Sour Cream Cracker (Renee, Appetizer); Sablefish and Scallop with Roasted Mushrooms and Chicken Jus (Benet, Main Course); Spaghetti Alla Chitarra with Duck Ragu, Pecorino and Crispy Sage; Butter Sable with Ice Cream and Sea Buckthorn Meringue (Sébastien, Dessert); Dark Chocolate Cake with Cherry Frozen Yogurt and Balsam Fir Meringue (Sébastien, dessert); Winners: Team Lake (Benet, Sébastien, Tania, Renee and Phil); Losers: Team Culmina (Paul M., Denis, Hayden, Wallace, Max); Eliminated: Max (Taleggio in Toasted Brioche with Asian Pear Puree and Matcha)
71	4	"The Nordic Feast"	May 4, 2020
Quickfire Challenge: The chefs were tasked to create a Top Chef quality grilled cheese and pair it with one type of fresh Canadian seafood. The guest judge for this challenge was certified cheese master and cheese shop owner Afrim Pristine. It is announced the chef with the best dish would receive immunity in the following Elimination Challenge.: Winner: Phil (Sablefish, Smoked Mozzarella and Pickled Green Tomato on Crispy Bread); Elimination Challenge: The chefs were tasked to create a dish to be part of a three course Nordic feast. Each chef randomly selected a traditional Nordic ingredient they would have to feature in their dish. It is announced that the challenge would be a blind tasting, hence the chefs would not be able to explain their dishes or visions to the judges. The chefs had time to forage for ingredients and shop before serving the judges on Toronto Island. Guest judge for this challenge was James Beard Award winner and culinary icon Marcus Samuelsson.: Winner: Hayden (Helbredt Oksekød: Cured Beef with Beer Bread, Oyster Cream and Crispy Lichen); Eliminated: Tania (Root Vegetable Cake with Sorrel Apple Puree, Toasted Oat Ice Cream and Lingonberry Chantilly)
72	5	"The Battle of Bao"	May 11, 2020
Quickfire Challenge: The chefs were tasked to take ingredients traditionally not enjoyed by children and turn them into a dish that they would be happy to eat. Each chef was randomly paired with either liver, anchovies, Brussels sprouts and cabbage and given 30 minutes to cook and plate. Along with two children judges, the chefs were joined by Top Chef USA season 8 winner and restaurant owner Richard Blais. It is announced that the chef with the best dish would receive a $5000 (CAD) donation to Kids Food Nation in their name, an advantage in the Elimination Challenge along with being able to attend a Kid Food Nation gala event in Ottawa.: Winner: Renee (Cabbage Salad with Crispy Prosciutto, Pancetta and Fried Brussels Sprouts); Elimination Challenge: The chefs were split into teams of two and tasked to create and run their own food stall featuring a concept and two dishes. Because Renee won the Quickfire Challenge she got to pick her own partner and make the remaining teams. The chefs served the judges and 150 patrons at Toronto's Assembly Chef's Hall. It is announced that the best duo would win a cash prize of 10,000 (CAD) from Interac and that the challenge is a double elimination, and both chefs from the losing team will be sent home.: Winners: Benet and Wallace (Fried Chicken on Steamed Buns with Cucumber Kimchi Salad and Gochujang Mayonnaise + Pork Canton Ragu on Rice with Crispy Potatoes and Olive Black Garlic Emulsion); Eliminated: Sébastien and Dennis (Steamed Buns with Fried Duck and Carrot & Cabbage Coleslaw + Dumplings Stuffed with Pork, Duck, Shrimp, Black Garlic and Lemongrass)
73	6	"What Goes Up Must Come Down"	May 6, 2019
Quickfire Challenge: The chefs were randomly split into two teams and tasked to create a six course tasting menu, one featuring mushrooms, one featuring tomatoes. The guest judge for this challenge was James Beard Award winner and cookbook author Michael Solomonov. It is announced the chef with the best individual dish would win a $5000 (CAD) cash prize from Café Kitchen Appliances.: Winning Team: Team Mushroom (Renee, Wallace, Paul M.); Overall Winner: Wallace (Hazelnut & Shiitake Mushroom Crumble with Birch Syrup Ice Cream and King Oyster Mushrooms.); Elimination Challenge: The chefs were tasked to take inspiration from classic carnival fare and pair it with a luxury ingredient to create a Top Chef quality dish. The chefs served 120 guests and the judging panel at Canada's Wonderland, Canada's largest amusement park. Cheating accusation: During Judges' Table Benet claimed that Wallace cheated during the Elimination Challenge and served a different variation of his dish to the judges. After an explanation from Wallace, the judges found the reasoning behind the accusation not to be valid and that his dish was honestly presented.: Winner: Wallace (Truffle & Porcini Donuts with Tapenade, Herb Aioli and Truffle Pecorino); Eliminated: Benet (Popcorn & Vanilla Ice Cream with Marshmallow, Chocolate Brownie, Carmelized Nuts and Cocoa Nibs)
74	7	"It's a Family Affair"	May 13, 2019
Quickfire Challenge: The chefs were presented with loved ones from home, who each brought a special ingredient that they must use to create a dish that reminds them of their childhood. In a twist, the chef's family members would help them cook, but for the first 15 minutes of the challenge the chefs had to be hands free, using verbal instructions only. The guest judges for this challenge were Top Chef finalist Rob Rossi and restaurant owner Craig Harding. It is announced that the chef with the best dish would win an advantage in the Elimination Challenge.: Winner: Phil and Heidi (Garlic Roasted Lamb Loin with Butter Fondant Potatoes and Brussels Sprouts); Elimination Challenge: The chefs were tasked to create a Top Chef quality dish that pairs with varieties of Mill Street beer, either a Cobblestone Lager, Ale, Nitro Stout or Organic Lager. As the winner of the Quickfire Challenge, Phil got to choose which beer he wanted to work with. The chefs cooked and served the judges at Mill Street's Beer Hall event space. It is announced that the chef with the best dish would win a $5000 (CAD) cash prize from Mill Street Brewery.: Winner: Paul M. (Parsnip Mushroom Cake with Woodruff Buckwheat Honey Ice Cream and Poached Pears); Eliminated: Renee (Vegetarian Curry with Eggplant, Sweet Potato, Cauliflower, Paneer, Coconut Milk and Lime Leaf)
75	8	"Winner Takes All"	May 20, 2019
Qualification Challenge: To qualify for the Final Challenge, the four remaining chefs were tasked to use ingredients that were featured in previous Elimination Challenge winning dishes and use them to create any dish they like to prove why they should move on . It is announced that this challenge is a double elimination and the two worst dishes will be sent home. Phil is paired with duck, Hayden with morel mushrooms, Paul M. with truffles and Wallace with black garlic.: Eliminated: Wallace (Roasted Salmon with Black Garlic, Black Bean Sauce, Pickled Pear, Green Apple and Brussels Sprouts); Eliminated: Hayden (Roasted Striploin with Green Peppercorn & Morel Jus, Morel-Braised Potato and Brown Butter Hollandaise); The Final Challenge: Paul and Phil, the final two chefs where tasked to create a five course progressive meal featuring any dishes they like to show why they deserve to be Canada's next Top Chef. The finalists were paired with former Top Chef Canada winners to help them execute their concepts and got to use the garden at Langdon Hall for ingredients as well as its kitchen facilities and dining space to present their dishes to the judging panel. Paul's Meal: Amuse BoucheMUSE BOUCHE: Crab & Kohlrabi Cannelloni, Parsnip Chip with Mousse & Caviar, Cucumber & Geoduck Temaki Cone; Appetizer: Sidestripe Shrimp Sashimi with Squid-Stuffed Shiitake Mushrooms and Lime Lemongrass Jalapeño Sorbet; First Main Course: Veal-Wrapped Tuna with Crispy Green Beans and Tortellini "Soup Dumplings"; Second Main Course: Bacon-Wrapped Pigeon Breast & Confit Leg with Glazed Sunchokes, Currants and Stuffed Morels; Dessert: Sorrel "Ice", Sesame Almond Macaron, Lemond Curd, Strawberries and Goat Cheese Snow; Phil's Meal: Amuse Bouche: Celeriac Soup with Crab Agnolotti and Roasted Radish; Appetizer: Mutsu Apple Salad, Szechuan Peppercorn Lemon Dressing, Roasted Walnuts and Avonlea Cheddar Cheese; First Main Course: Grilled Sturgeon, Braised Wild Rice, Wild Mushrooms and Sea Asparagus; Second Main Course: Harissa-Braised Lamb Neck and Seared Lamb Loin with Sweet & Sour Eggplant, Cucumber and Tahini; Dessert: Salted Caramel Pots De Crème, Crème Anglaise, Black Pepper Pecans and Black Pepper.; The judges deliberate on who of the two chefs should be crowned Canada's top chef.: Runner Up: Phil; Top Chef: Paul Paul was named Canada's 7th Top Chef. The judges praised him for his overall consistency, homey dishes that featured flavors from his roots and his near flawless finale meal. Paul is today regarded one of the best chefs to compete on Top Chef Canada, with consistent top placing dishes in many of the challenges.
