= Top Chef Canada season 4 =

Top Chef Canada
- Season 4
- No. of contestants: 14
- Winner: Rene Rodriguez

Release
- Original network: Food Network
- Original release: March 10 – May 12, 2014

Season chronology
- ← Previous; Season 3 Next → Season 5

The fourth season of the Canadian reality competition show Top Chef Canada was broadcast on Food Network in Canada. It is a Canadian spin-off of Bravo's show Top Chef.

== Contestants ==
14 chefs competed in season four. Names, ages, hometowns, and cities of residence (at time of filming) are from the Food Network Canada website.: In the order eliminated:

1. Michael Robbins, 29, Vancouver, BC
2. Ruth Wigman, 31, St. John's, NL (Hometown: Nanaimo, BC)
3. Dawn Doucette, 41, Vancouver, BC
4. Gabriela Neda, 26, Caracas, Venezuela
5. Lauren Marshall, 26, Mount Uniacke, NS
6. Karine Moulin, 36, Quebec City, QC
7. Pierre Lamielle, 34, Calgary, AB (Hometown: North Vancouver, BC)
8. Shelley Robinson, 50, Vancouver, BC
9. Evelynn Takoff, 28, Kelowna, BC
10. Vittorio Colacitti, 32, Toronto, ON
11. Jesse Vergen, 35, Saint John, NB
12. Rich Francis, 36, Fort McPherson, NT
13. Terry Salmond, 30, Kitchener, ON
14. Rene Rodriguez, 41, Ottawa, ON

== Contestant Progress ==
No.	Contestant	1	2	3	4	5	6	7	8	9	10
No.	Quickfire; Winner	Rich, Gabriela	Terry	Rene	Shelley	Rich, Rene	Vittorio^{4}	Terry	Rich	Rich	—
1	Rene	IN	IN	IN	HIGH	LOW^{3}	WIN	IN	LOW	LOW	WINNER
2	Terry	LOW	IN	WIN	LOW	WIN	HIGH	HIGH	LOW	HIGH	RUNNER-UP
3	Rich	LOW^{1}	IN	HIGH	IN	LOW^{3}	LOW	LOW	LOW	WIN	THIRD PLACE
4	Jesse	IN	WIN	HIGH	LOW	WIN	LOW	WIN	WIN	OUT	
4	Vittorio	IN	HIGH	HIGH	IN	LOW	HIGH	LOW	WIN	OUT	
6	Evelynn	IN	WIN	LOW	LOW	IN	HIGH	HIGH	OUT		
7	Shelley	IN	IN	LOW	LOW^{2}	HIGH	LOW	OUT			
8	Pierre	LOW	IN	HIGH	WIN	HIGH	OUT				
9	Karine	IN	HIGH	IN	WIN	OUT					
9	Lauren	WIN	LOW	HIGH	HIGH	OUT					
11	Gabriela	HIGH	LOW	LOW	OUT						
12	Dawn	IN	LOW	OUT							
13	Ruth	IN	OUT								
14	Michael	OUT									

^Note 1 : Although in the bottom, Rich had won immunity in the quickfire challenge, so he was not eligible to be eliminated.
^Note 2 : Although in the bottom, Shelley had won immunity in the quickfire challenge, so she was not eligible to be eliminated.
^Note 3 : Although in the bottom, Rich and Rene had won immunity in the quickfire challenge, so they were not eligible to be eliminated.
^Note 4 : Starting from this quickfire, immunity is no longer available.

(WINNER) The chef won the season and was crowned Top Chef.
(RUNNER-UP) The chef was a runner-up for the season.
(THIRD-PLACE) The chef placed third in the competition.
(WIN) The chef won that episode's Elimination Challenge.
(HIGH) The chef was selected as one of the top entries in the Elimination Challenge, but did not win.
(LOW) The chef was selected as one of the bottom entries in the Elimination Challenge, but was not eliminated.
(OUT) The chef lost that week's Elimination Challenge and was out of the competition.
(IN) The chef neither won nor lost that week's Elimination Challenge. They also were not up to be eliminated.

== Episodes ==
No. overall	No. in season	Title	Original release date
40	1	"The Battle Of The Sexes"	March 10, 2014
41	2	"The World According To Chang"	March 17, 2014
42	3	"Five Alarm Fire"	March 24, 2014
43	4	"Chefs, Start Your Engines"	March 31, 2014
44	5	"Game, Set, Match"	April 7, 2014
45	6	"Restaurant Wars"	April 14, 2014
46	7	"Lords And Ladies At The Castle"	April 21, 2014
47	8	"School's Out For The Chefs"	April 28, 2014
48	9	"The Science Of Food"	May 5, 2014
49	10	"The Finale's Taboo"	May 12, 2014
