= Top Chef Canada season 2 =

Top Chef Canada
- Season 2
- No. of tasks: 25
- No. of contestants: 16
- Winner: Carl Heinrich
- No. of episodes: 13

Release
- Original network: Food Network
- Original release: March 12 – May 28, 2012

Season chronology
- ← Previous; Season 1 Next → Season 3

The second season of the Canadian reality competition show Top Chef Canada was broadcast on Food Network in Canada. It is a Canadian spin-off of Bravo's hit show Top Chef. In the first season, 16 chefs competed against each other in weekly challenges. The program took place in Toronto.

== Contestants ==
16 chefs competed in season two. Names, ages, hometowns, and cities of residence (at time of filming) are from the Food Network Canada website. In the order eliminated:

- William Thompson, 30, Caledonia, ON (Hometown: Caledonia, ON)
- Kunal Ghose, 39, Victoria, BC (Hometown: Victoria, BC)
- Sarah Tsai, 30, Toronto, ON (Hometown: Taipei, Taiwan)
- Sergio Mattoscio, 30, Montreal, QC (Hometown: Montreal, QC)
- Joel Aubie, 27, Tofino, BC (Hometown: Bathurst, NB)
- Gabriell Cruz, 25, Dundas, ON (Hometown: Hamilton, ON)
- Elizabeth Rivasplata, 31, Toronto, ON (Hometown: Lima, Peru)
- Curtis Luk, 28, Ottawa, ON (Hometown: Markham, ON)
- Jimmy Stewart, 23, Whistler, British Columbia (Hometown: North Vancouver, BC)
- Ryan Gallagher, 33, Toronto, ON (Hometown: Toronto, ON)
- Trista Sheen, 29, Toronto, ON (Hometown: Toronto, ON)
- Xavier Lacaze, 30, Calgary, AB (Hometown: Auch, France)
- David Crystian, 37, Toronto, ON (Hometown: Toronto, ON)
- Jonathan Korecki, 27, Ottawa, ON (Hometown: Caledon, ON)
- Trevor Bird, 28, Vancouver, BC (Hometown: Montreal, QC)
- Carl Heinrich, 26, Toronto, ON (Hometown: Sooke, BC)

== Contestant progress ==
No.	Contestant	1	2	3	4	5	6	7	8	9	10	11	12	13
No.	Quickfire; Winner	Sarah	Gabriell	Jimmy	Jonathan^{2}	Xavier	Jonathan^{2}	Ryan	Carl^{2}	Trevor^{2}	Trevor^{2}	David^{2}	Carl^{2}	None
1	Carl	IN	HIGH	HIGH	HIGH	WIN	WIN	IN	HIGH	HIGH	LOW	LOW	WIN	WINNER
2	Trevor	IN	LOW	HIGH	IN	IN	HIGH	HIGH	HIGH	HIGH	LOW	LOW	HIGH	RUNNER-UP
3	Jonathan	IN	HIGH	HIGH	IN	IN	HIGH	LOW	WIN	HIGH	HIGH	WIN	LOW	THIRD PLACE
4	David	LOW	HIGH	LOW	WIN	IN	HIGH	HIGH	HIGH	LOW	WIN	HIGH	OUT	FOURTH PLACE^{4}
5	Xavier	IN	LOW	LOW	IN	HIGH	LOW	WIN	LOW	LOW	HIGH	OUT		
6	Trista	WIN	IN	IN	LOW	HIGH	LOW	IN	LOW	WIN	OUT			
7	Ryan	IN	LOW	IN	IN	LOW	LOW	IN	LOW	OUT				
8	Jimmy	LOW	IN	IN	HIGH	LOW	LOW	LOW	OUT					
9	Curtis	HIGH	IN	WIN	LOW	HIGH	HIGH	OUT						
10	Elizabeth	HIGH	WIN	IN	HIGH	IN	OUT							
11	Gabriell	IN	HIGH	IN	LOW	LOW	OUT^{3}							
12	Joel	IN	LOW	LOW	IN	OUT								
13	Sergio	IN	IN	IN	OUT									
14	Sarah	LOW^{1}	IN	OUT										
15	Kunal	HIGH	OUT											
16	William	OUT												

^Note 1: Although she was in the bottom, Sarah was spared from elimination as she had immunity.
^Note 2: Did not gain immunity.
^Note 3: Eliminated by placing last in the quickfire challenge.
^Note 4: Won comeback challenge and was allowed back into the final challenge.

(WINNER) The chef won the season and was crowned Top Chef.
(RUNNER-UP) The chef was a runner-up for the season.
(THIRD-PLACE) The chef placed third in the competition.
(FOURTH-PLACE) The chef placed fourth in the competition.
(WIN) The chef won that episode's Elimination Challenge.
(HIGH) The chef was selected as one of the top entries in the Elimination Challenge, but did not win.
(LOW) The chef was selected as one of the bottom entries in the Elimination Challenge, but was not eliminated.
(OUT) The chef lost that week's Elimination Challenge and was out of the competition.
(IN) The chef neither won nor lost that week's Elimination Challenge. They also were not up to be eliminated.

== Episodes ==
The format of season two followed that of the first season and of the original American Top Chef. As before, each week features a guest judge or special guest, including Top Chef: Masters season two winner Chef Marcus Samuelsson, television handy-man Mike Holmes, Toronto Maple Leafs forward Colby Armstrong, actor Alan Thicke, Spencer "Spenny" Rice, and country musician Johnny Reid.

No. overall	No. in season	Title	Original release date
14	1	"Home Is Where The Heart Is"	March 12, 2012
Quickfire Challenge: 15 minutes to reuse party leftovers to create new hors d'oeuvres; Top: Trevor, Joel, Sarah; Bottom: Ryan, Xavier, Curtis, Elizabeth; WINNER: Sarah; Elimination Challenge: 90 minutes to create a dish that represents the chef and his/her hometown.; WINNER: Trista (veal tenderloin with potato rosti, corn cream and bacon jam); ELIMINATED: William (wine barrel smoked quail and porcini mushroom mashed potato); Guest Judge: Michael Smith
15	2	"Building A Home For Friends"	March 19, 2012
Quickfire Challenge: Create a refined dish under the critical eye of HGTV star and guest judge Mike Holmes; Top: Carl, Gabriell, Trista; Bottom: Elizabeth, Ryan, Trevor; WINNER: Gabriell; Elimination Challenge: The chefs must divide into teams to create a meal for hungry Habitat for Humanity construction workers.; WINNER: Elizabeth (BBQ chicken, lemonade, and apple slaw); ELIMINATED: Kunal (yogurt–marinated grilled pork on a flat bread); Guest Judge: Mike Holmes
16	3	"Here Comes the Stork"	March 26, 2012
Quickfire Challenge: Create a dish that fuses two radically different ingredients; Top: Sergio, Ryan, Jimmy; Bottom: Xavier, Sarah, Elizabeth; WINNER: Jimmy; Elimination Challenge: The chefs must divide into pairs to create food for a baby shower in honour of Top Chef Canada season one host Thea Andrews and resident judge Shereen Arazm, both of whom are expecting their second children.; WINNER: Curtis (Pink peppercorn macaroon, with touches of lemongrass and meyer lemon); ELIMINATED: Sarah (Sweet arancini with spicy chocolate prosciutto sauce); Guest Judge: Thea Andrews
17	4	"Isn't It Offal?"	April 2, 2012
Quickfire Challenge: The chefs must taste different kinds of meats blindfolded.; Top: Jonathan, Gabriell, Sergio, Ryan (5 meats each); Bottom: Trista, Elizabeth (2 meats each); Sudden Death: The four remaining chefs must taste non-meat ingredients blindfolded.; WINNER: Jonathan; Elimination Challenge: Create a thirteen course menu using offal.; WINNER: David (Duck Liver ice cream); ELIMINATED: Sergio (Beef tongue poutine); Guest Judge: Chris Consentino (elimination challenge only)
18	5	"Food Through Time"	April 9, 2012
Quickfire Challenge: The chefs must create a game snack using Tostitos tortilla chips; Top: Xavier, Elizabeth, Gabriell; Bottom: Jimmy, Joel, Jonathan; WINNER: Xavier; Elimination Challenge: The chefs must create an hors d'oeurves based on a decade in time; WINNER: Carl (homemade burger concealing a little piece of foie gras, served on a homemade bun with aged cheddar and Branston pickle); ELIMINATED: Joel (Glazed ham with pineapple); Guest Judge: Colby Armstrong (quickfire challenge only), Alan Thicke (elimination challenge only)
19	6	"Restaurant Wars"	April 16, 2012
Highstakes Quickfire Challenge: The chefs must create a soup and sandwich combo.; Top: Jonathan, Ryan, Carl; Bottom: Gabriell, Curtis, Trista; WINNER: Jonathan (Chinese-Style BBQ Chicken Consommé and Vietnamese Sub); ELIMINATED: Gabriell (Butter-Toasted Bread with Rosemary Soup and Prosciutto with Truffle Sandwich); Elimination Challenge: Restaurant Wars: Two teams of 5 will run their own restaurant.; Team True North: Elizabeth, Jimmy, Ryan, Trista, Xavier: Appetizers: Corn Soup with Marinated Fennel and Smoked Paprika Oil (Ryan), "Into the Garden" Salad with Porcini "soil" and Soft-Boiled Quail Egg (Jimmy), Braised Octopus with Lemon-Herb Yogurt and Pickled Baby Carrots (Elizabeth); Entrees: Roasted Pork Loin and Crispy Pig Ear Salad with maple-Roasted Apples (Elizabeth), Pan-Roasted Duck Breast with White Beans, Red Cabbage and Sherry Jus (Xavier), Wild BC Sockeye Salmon and Olive Oil Crushed Potatoes with Lemon Broth (Trista), Potato Risotto with Portabello, Radish, Chives and Crispy Potatoes (Jimmy); Desserts: Dark Chocolate Torte with Raspberry Sorbet and Cocoa Nibs Tuile (Xavier), Plum Almond Cake with peach Compote and Sour Cream Ice Cream (Trista); Team Fable: Carl, Curtis, David, Jonathan, Trevor: Appetizers: Duck and Quail Terrine with Sweet and Sour Dandelion and Preserved Plum (David), Marinated Tomato Salad with Buffalo Mozzarella (Jonathan); Entrees: Roasted Beef Striploin with Brown Butter Hollandaise, Baby Vegetables and Beef Jus (Carl), Sage Gnocchi with Butternut Squash Purée, Chanterelles and Corn (Carl), Salmon with Bacon Pommes Anna, Carrot Purée and Peas (Curtis); Desserts: Peach Crumbled Panna Cotta (Trevor), Flourless Chocolate Cake with Cherry Sorbet and Cherry Cardamom Caramel (Curtis and David); WINNER: Carl of Fable; ELIMINATED: Elizabeth of True North; Guest Judge: Susur Lee and his sons Kai and Levi (elimination challenge only)
20	7	"A Classic Deconstruction"	April 23, 2012
Quickfire Challenge: The chefs must create a dish from mystery canned foods; Top: Ryan, Curtis, Trevor; Bottom: David, Jonathan, Carl; WINNER: Ryan; Elimination Challenge: The chefs must deconstruct a classic dish into a whole new dish; WINNER: Xavier (Deconstructed Quiche Lorraine); ELIMINATED: Curtis (Deconstructed Tuna Casseole); Guest Judge: Richard Blais (quickfire & elimination), Johnny Reid (elimination)
21	8	"Lights, Camera, Action!"	April 30, 2012
Quickfire Challenge: The chefs will be tested on their skills.; Round 1: Dice as many shallots as possible in three minutes; Round 2: French a rack of lamb; Round 3: Peel as many grapes as possible in three minutes; Final Round: Use prepped ingredients to create a dish; WINNER: Carl; Elimination Challenge: Cater for the cast and crew of Lost Girl; WINNER: Jonathan (pulled pork lettuce wrap); ELIMINATED: Jimmy (Leafy Green Salad with Cucumbers, Tomato and Shaved Fennel), (Green Minestrone with Porcini, Lemon Juice, and Truffle Oil); Guest Judge: Michael Blackie, Anna Silk, Rick Howland, K. C. Collins (elimination challenge only)
22	9	"Into The Wild"	May 7, 2012
Quickfire Challenge: The chefs must create a dish using ingredients found in an everyday vending machine; Top: Trevor, Trista; Bottom: David, Carl; WINNER: Trevor; Elimination Challenge: The chefs go camping to create a wild brunch in the middle of nowhere after spending the night in the great outdoors; WINNER: Trista; ELIMINATED: Ryan; Guest Judge: Spenny Rice (quickfire challenge only), Roger Mooking (elimination challenge only)
23	10	"Show Us Your Soul"	May 14, 2012
Quickfire Challenge: The chefs must create a kid-friendly dish for the son of season 1 Top Chef Canada winner, Dale MacKay; Top: Trevor, Carl; Bottom: Jonathan, Xavier; WINNER: Trevor; Elimination Challenge: The chefs must create a dish that reflects their soul; WINNER: David; ELIMINATED: Trista; Guest Judge(s): Dale MacKay and his son (quickfire and elimination), Marcus Samuelsson (elimination challenge only)
24	11	"The Italian Feast"	May 21, 2012
Quickfire Challenge: The chefs must use Kraft Dinner to create two dishes for singer-songwriter, Keshia Chanté. One preparation had to be fine dining, while the other was to be presented family-style.; Top: David, Xavier; Bottom: Trevor, Jonathan; Winner: David; Elimination Challenge: The chefs have to create dishes for an Italian feast at Mark McEwan's Italian Eatery, Fabbrica.; Winner: Jonathan; Eliminated: Xavier; Guest Judge(s): Keshia Chanté, Lidia Bastianich: Note: This was a highstakes Quickfire, with the winner earning a $10,000 prize sponsored by Kraft Foods. This highstakes Quickfire did not include the elimination of any of the chefs.
25	12	"Food Meets Fashion"	May 28, 2012
Quickfire Challenge: The chefs must make two pies, one sweet and one savoury, for Toronto chef Marc Thuet and restaurateur Biana Zorich.; Top: Carl, Trevor; Bottom: Jonathan, David; Winner: Carl; Elimination Challenge: The chefs have to create dishes inspired by haute couture for a dinner in the square at the Shops at Don Mills.. The chefs were assisted by former Season 1 competitors of Top Chef Canada, Rob Rossi, Connie DeSousa, Dustin Gallagher, and Francois Gagnon.; Winner: Carl; Eliminated: David; Carl won a custom Caesar Stone counter installation for winning the Quickfire and $10,000 for winning the Elimination Challenge. Trevor, for getting into the top of the Quickfire will have his sweet pie at Milestone's Restaurant and Grill as part of the Top Chef Canada's features menu, and $3000 cash prize from Milestone's.
26	13	"Finale"	June 4, 2012
Comeback challenge: Trista, Xavier, and David, each eliminated in the last three preceding episodes, were challenged to produce at least two dishes using ingredients from Prince Edward Island: beef, mussels, lobster, oysters, and potatoes. Winner would be allowed back into the final challenge. Carl, Jonathan and Trevor participated as guest judges.; WINNER: David. Wins a trip for two to Prince Edward Island and got to attend to the PEI Fall Flavours Festival, and was allowed back into the final challenge.; Final challenge: The final four contestants were challenged to produce a four course meal, at Hockley Valley Resort, near Orangeville, Ontario. Each was assisted by a previous contestant eliminated earlier in the competition, selected at random by drawing knives.; TOP CHEF: Carl (assisted by Trista).; Runners-up: Trevor (Jimmy), followed by Jonathan (Elizabeth) and David (Xavier).; Guest judge: Vikram Vij
