= Top Chef Canada season 1 =

Top Chef Canada
- Season 1
- No. of tasks: 26
- No. of contestants: 16
- Winner: Dale McKay
- No. of episodes: 13

Release
- Original network: Food Network
- Original release: April 11 – July 4, 2011

Season chronology
- Next → Season 2

The first season of the Canadian reality competition show Top Chef Canada was broadcast on Food Network in Canada. It is a Canadian spin-off of Bravo's hit show Top Chef. In the first season, 16 chefs competed against each other in weekly challenges. The program took place in Toronto. In the season finale that premiered on July 4, 2011, Dale MacKay was crowned Top Chef Canada.

== Contestants ==
Sixteen chefs competed in season one. Names, ages, hometowns, and cities of residence (at time of filming) are from the Food Network Canada website. In the order eliminated:

- Michael Stauffer, 30, Dundas, ON
- Clayton Beadle, 26, Whistler, BC
- Rebekah Pearse, 29, Calgary, AB
- Steve Gonzales, 35, Toronto, ON
- Derek Bocking, 30, Montreal, QC
- Jamie Hertz, 31, Nelson, BC
- Chris Kanka, 34, Toronto, ON
- Patrick Wiese, 40, Toronto, ON
- Todd Perrin, 40, Quidi Vidi Village, St. John's, NL
- Darryl Crumb, 29, Winnipeg, MB
- Andrea Nicholson, 28, Toronto, ON
- Francois Gagnon, 32, Montreal, QC
- Dustin Gallagher, 28, Toronto, ON
- Connie DeSousa, 29, Calgary, AB
- Rob Rossi, 27, Toronto, ON
- Dale MacKay, 30, Saskatoon, SK

== Contestant progress ==
No.	Contestant	1	2	3	4	5	6	7	8	9	10	11	12	Finale
No.	Quickfire; Winner	Dale	Todd	Chris	Dustin	Francois^{4}	Francois	Todd	Rob; Dustin; Andrea; Todd	Andrea	Connie	Rob	Dale	Connie
1	Dale	IN	IN	LOW	HIGH	WIN	IN	LOW	WIN	WIN	HIGH	LOW	LOW	WINNER
2	Rob	WIN	HIGH	HIGH	LOW	HIGH	WIN	IN	LOW	HIGH	IN	WIN	WIN	RUNNER-UP
3	Connie	IN	HIGH	WIN	WIN	IN	HIGH	HIGH	HIGH	LOW	WIN	LOW	HIGH	THIRD PLACE
4	Dustin	IN	LOW	IN	LOW^{3}	HIGH	HIGH	WIN	LOW	IN	IN	HIGH	OUT	
5	Francois	HIGH	IN	IN	IN	IN	HIGH	HIGH	HIGH	HIGH	LOW	OUT		
6	Andrea	HIGH	WIN	HIGH	LOW	HIGH	LOW	LOW	LOW	IN	OUT			
7	Darryl	IN	LOW	HIGH	IN	LOW	LOW	IN	HIGH	OUT				
8	Todd	IN	IN	IN	WIN	LOW	LOW	IN	OUT					
9	Patrick	IN	IN	LOW	IN	LOW	IN	OUT						
10	Chris	LOW	IN	LOW^{2}	IN	IN	OUT							
11	Jamie	LOW	LOW	IN	HIGH	OUT								
12	Derek	HIGH	IN	IN	OUT									
13	Steve	IN	IN	OUT										
14	Rebekah	IN	OUT											
15	Clayton	LOW	OUT^{1}											
16	Michael	OUT												

^Note 1 : Eliminated by placing last in the Quickfire Challenge.
^Note 2 : Although in the bottom, Chris had won immunity in the quickfire challenge, so he was not eligible to be eliminated.
^Note 3 : Although in the bottom, Dustin had won immunity in the quickfire challenge, so he was not eligible to be eliminated.
^Note 4 : In the knife pull, Francois pulled "Hog Wild", guaranteeing immunity, while the Black Team finished the relay first and gained an extra hundred dollars in their budget.

(WINNER) The chef won the season and was crowned Top Chef.
(RUNNER-UP) The chef was a runner-up for the season.
(THIRD-PLACE) The chef placed third in the competition.
(WIN) The chef won that episode's Elimination Challenge.
(HIGH) The chef was selected as one of the top entries in the Elimination Challenge, but did not win.
(LOW) The chef was selected as one of the bottom entries in the Elimination Challenge, but was not eliminated.
(OUT) The chef lost that week's Elimination Challenge and was out of the competition.
(IN) The chef neither won nor lost that week's Elimination Challenge. They also were not up to be eliminated.

== Episodes ==
Each episode includes two challenges. The Quickfire Challenge is a short, simple challenge with a varying reward each week. In the initial episodes of the season, it usually guarantees the winner immunity from being sent home that week; however, in the latter stages, the Quickfire winner is given an advantage in the upcoming Elimination Challenge. It also has been made clear that Quickfire winners this season may receive other rewards, including cash prizes. The Elimination Challenge is a more complex challenge that determines who goes home. One or more judges join the show each week to evaluate both the Quickfire and Elimination challenges. Each week's elimination is announced in a segment called "Judges' Table." Each week of season one featured a guest judge or special guest, such as Dan Aykroyd, Susur Lee, Daniel Boulud, Rob Feenie, and recurring judge on the American version, Gail Simmons.

No. overall	No. in season	Title	Original release date
1	1	"Getting To Know You"	April 11, 2011
Quickfire Challenge: The 16 chefs competed in a three-round mise en place tournament. The Quickfire prize was immunity at the elimination challenge.; Round One: Fillet a red snapper; fastest eight move on to Round Two.; Round Two: Peel and prep artichoke hearts; four with the most number of prepared artichokes move on to Round Three.; Round Three: Prepare a hollandaise sauce; best two move on to the final round.; The final two chefs were given 20 minutes to make a dish with the ingredients from the first three rounds, plus items from the Top Chef pantry.: WINNER: Dale (pan roasted snapper, hollandaise sauce, black garlic potatoes and roasted artichoke); Elimination Challenge: The chefs each create a dish that represents who they are and where they come from.; WINNER: Rob (BC halibut, butter poached lobster, crushed potatoes, black trumpet purée); ELIMINATED: Michael (roasted lamb saddle with summer vegetables, chèvre fondant and tomato consommé); Guest Judge: Vikram Vij (Elimination Challenge)
2	2	"Cheese, Glorious Cheese"	April 18, 2011
Quickfire Challenge: In this high-stakes Quickfire, the chefs must prepare breakfast using 100% cow's milk cheese. The winner earns immunity in the Elimination Challenge, while the loser goes home. After announcing the bottom three dishes, the chefs who cooked them are each given a second chance to save themselves, with 20 minutes to cook an amuse-bouche.; Top: Andrea, Rob, Todd; Bottom: Clayton, Dale, Francois; WINNER: Todd (Crêpe with bacon, spinach, le Guillaume Tell cheese, poached egg); ELIMINATED: Clayton (Grilled wagu beef with tomato truffle vinaigrette); Elimination Challenge: Working in pairs, the chefs must create a cheese dish that complements the personality of their partner.; WINNER: Andrea (Apple butter and cheddar on walnut infused cracker with pickled celery and apple salad); ELIMINATED: Rebekah (Buckwheat and potato blini with le Guillaume Tell cheese and braised veal); Guest Judge: Julia Rogers (Elimination Challenge)
3	3	"From Russia with Vodka"	April 25, 2011
Quickfire Challenge: A blind taste test of 20 ingredients.; Bottom: Francois (1 out of 20); WINNER: Chris (13 out of 20); Elimination Challenge: Chefs were split into two teams to serve a Russian zakuski meal, inspired by Dan Aykroyd's brand of vodka, Crystal Head Vodka which is made in Newfoundland.; INDIVIDUAL WINNER: Connie (Smoked garlic sausage with picked fennel and flax lavash); ELIMINATED: Steve (Warm potato salad with warm bacon foam, wild salmon caviar with fresh dill); Guest Judge: Dan Aykroyd
4	4	"Food From Around The World"	May 2, 2011
Quickfire Challenge: Create a signature salad. The winner of the Quickfire gains immunity for the Elimination Challenge.; Top: Andrea, Darryl; Bottom: Rob, Francois, Todd; WINNER: Dustin (Beet carpaccio with wasabi mustard, pickled onions, sliced apples and garlic chips); Elimination Challenge: In pairs, chefs must create a pair of complementing dishes (one hot, one cold) that fits the country chefs draw from the knife block.; WINNERS: Team Ethiopia - Connie/Todd (Traditional Ethiopian ground beef with curry spices and traditional lamb Katwa (Connie); Red and green lentil salad, tomato salad with onion & cucumber and Injera (Todd)); ELIMINATED: Derek (Beef braised side ribs with a smoky chocolate BBQ sauce & spicy corn salsa) (Team Mexico); Guest Judge: Susur Lee
5	5	"Pork to the People"	May 9, 2011
Quickfire Challenge: Butchery relay race. Each team must portion a pig into 5 parts: picnic shoulder, loin, belly, shoulder butt, or leg. The first team to complete all the portions to the satisfaction of the guest judge would be the winner. The chefs were divided into two teams and assigned their cut of meat by drawing knives.; Top: Connie, Dale, Todd, Chris, Dustin (Black Team); Bottom: Patrick, Darryl, Rob, Jamie, Andrea (White Team); WINNER: Black Team. Members of the winning team were provided with an extra $100 in their budget for the Elimination Challenge.; Francois pulled a "Hog Wild!" knife, which gave him automatic immunity for the Elimination Challenge and exempted him from participating in the Quickfire Challenge.; Elimination Challenge: Create two hors d'oeuvres for a 100 cocktail party guests to benefit Food Banks Canada. One of the dishes must utilise the cut of meat they drew in the Quickfire. The chefs cooked at George Brown College and had the assistance of one sous chef, a student from the college selected by a draw of knives.; WINNERS: Dale; ELIMINATED: Jamie(Smoked salmon mousse, pickled beets and pork); Guest Judges: Steven Alexander (Quickfire challenge), John Higgins (Elimination challenge)
6	6	"The French Feast"	May 16, 2011
Quickfire Challenge: Chefs must create their own version of the Canadian classic snack food, poutine.; Top: Todd, Darryl; Bottom: Dale, Chris, Andrea; WINNER: Francois; Elimination Challenge: As a team, create a ten-course meal using classic French proteins, drawn from the knife block.; WINNER: Rob (Sweetbreads with garlic puree); ELIMINATED: Chris; Guest Judges: Chuck Hughes (Quickfire challenge), Daniel Boulud and Laura Calder (Elimination challenge); This episode was controversial as one of the proteins used in the tasting menu was horse meat. In response to the controversy, Food Network Canada issued a statement acknowledging the use of horse meat was controversial, but it was trying to create an episode involving "a truly authentic, traditional French menu." Unlike other episodes, the online video of this episode is not included on Food Network Canada's website.
7	7	"Life's Little Milestones"	May 23, 2011
Quickfire Challenge: Chefs must prepare a dish using All-Bran cereal as an ingredient.; Top: Darryl, Andrea; Bottom: Patrick, Francois, Rob; WINNER: Todd; Elimination Challenge: Chefs must create a familiar dish "with a twist" for guests celebrating their anniversary, served at Milestones Grill and Bar. The nine contestants are divided into three groups to make either an appetizer, main, and dessert. The winning dish from each category would be featured in a Milestones "Top Chef Canada" menu.; WINNER: Dustin (Strawberry shortcake with Ontario strawberries and lemon curd); ELIMINATED: Patrick; Guest Judge: Michael Smith
8	8	"Restaurant Wars"	May 30, 2011
Quickfire Challenge: In teams of four, chefs must produce a dish together in a tag-team format, without speaking to one another. Each chef had 10 minutes to prep their portion of their team's dish. Team captains were determined by drawing knives and Francois picked Dale, Connie, and Darryl, while Rob selected Dustin, Todd, and Andrea.; WINNERS: Team Red - Dustin, Andrea, Rob, Todd (Pancetta-wrapped scallops with potato rosti); Elimination Challenge: Restaurant Wars. Within the same teams as above, chefs must operate a restaurant service while one served at the front of house as maitre d'.; WINNER: Dale (Strawberry souffle with champagne berry shooter); ELIMINATED: Todd (Chicken terrine, peach gratin); Guest Judge: David Adjey
9	9	"The Numbers Game"	June 6, 2011
Quickfire Challenge: The remaining chefs are asked to complete a dish with the specific number of ingredients that were on the knives they drew. Salt, pepper and oil are the only ingredients exempt from the count. Amounts range from 4 to 16 ingredients.; Top: Connie; Bottom: Dale, Francois; WINNER: Andrea; Elimination Challenge: The Top 7 were asked to create a dish that people could create easily and prepare at home. Competitors were allowed up to five President's Choice items in their food. They would then serve their food to customers at a local Loblaws supermarket.; WINNER: Dale (Pulled pork sandwich with salted watermelon); ELIMINATED: Darryl (Vegetarian Manicotti); Guest Judge: Roger Mooking
10	10	"A Day in the Life of Canadian Food"	June 13, 2011
Quickfire Challenge: Prepare two meals that can fit into a box to be served on a Porter Airlines flight.; Top: Dale, Rob; Bottom: Andrea, Dustin; WINNER: Connie; Elimination Challenge: Prepare three dishes that reflect the ingredients and cuisine of a region of Canada.; WINNER: Connie; ELIMINATED: Andrea; Guest Judges: Lynn Crawford (Elimination and Quickfire), Jonathan Gushue (Elimination only)
11	11	"Surf and Turf"	June 20, 2011
Quickfire Challenge: From a table of seafood, chefs must fill a bowl of ingredients of their choice. After having made their selections, without having been forewarned, the chefs must swap them with the competitor at the table to their left. From these ingredients, they must create 3 dishes.; Top: Dustin, Francois; Bottom: Connie, Dale; WINNER: Rob; Elimination Challenge: Drawing names of two countries from the knifeblock, chefs must create two street food dishes that combine their two chosen countries' cuisines.; WINNER: Rob (Canada and Spain - Sloppy joes, ham and cheese sandwich); ELIMINATED: Francois (Vietnam and China - "Dim sum" in soup, Peking duck rice rolls); Guest Judge: Rob Feenie
12	12	"Chef Mark McEwan's Favorite Things"	June 27, 2011
Quickfire Challenge: Create a dish that best represents a famous Canadian movie. The movies used in the challenge were My Big Fat Greek Wedding, Ginger Snaps, Bon Cop, Bad Cop, and Naked Lunch.; WINNER: Dale (Pan-seared salmon, squid ink risotto); Elimination Challenge: The chefs were required to make three "family style" dishes for the judges.; WINNER: Rob; ELIMINATED: Dustin; Guest Judge: Gail Simmons
13	13	"Finale"	July 4, 2011
Quickfire Challenge: Create a post-game BBQ dish centered around Rickard's red, white and dark beers.; WINNER: Connie; Final Challenge: The final three contestants were challenged to produce a three course meal, at Peller Estates in Niagara on the Lake, Ontario. Each was assisted by a previous contestant eliminated earlier in the competition; Top Chef: Dale; Guest Judge: Jason Parsons
