= Top Chef Canada season 3 =

Top Chef Canada
- Season 3
- No. of tasks: 26
- No. of contestants: 16
- Winner: Matthew Stowe

Release
- Original network: Food Network
- Original release: March 18 – June 10, 2013

Season chronology
- ← Previous; Season 2 Next → Season 4

The third season of the Canadian reality competition show Top Chef Canada was broadcast on Food Network in Canada. It is a Canadian spin-off of Bravo's hit show Top Chef.

== Contestants ==
16 chefs competed in season three. Names, ages, hometowns, and cities of residence (at time of filming) are from the Food Network Canada website. In the order eliminated:

Eliminated:

- Fred Boucher, 28, Price, QC (Hometown: Price, QC)
- Ruth Eddolls, 30, Acton, ON (Hometown: Bristol, England)
- Clement Chan, 33, Vancouver, BC (Hometown: Vancouver, BC)
- Kayla Dhaliwall, 28, Victoria, BC (Hometown: Victoria, BC)
- Daniel Hudson, 29, Coalville, UK (Hometown: Coalville, UK)
- Chris Chafe, 24, St. John's, NL (Hometown: St. John's, NL)
- Chris Shaften, 28, Calgary, AB (Hometown: Calgary, AB)
- Rory White, 23, Mississauga, ON (Hometown: Mississauga, ON)
- Rebecca "Becky" Ross, 24, Medicine Hat, AB (Hometown: Medicine Hat, AB)
- Caitlin "Caity" Hall, 24, Maple Ridge, BC (Hometown: Maple Ridge, BC)
- Geoff Rogers, 31, Calgary, AB (Hometown: Calgary, AB)
- Nicole Gomes, 34, Richmond, BC (Hometown: Richmond, BC)
- Dennis Tay, 34, Windsor, ON (Hometown: Windsor, ON)
- Jonathan Goodyear, 34, Toronto, ON (Hometown: Toronto, ON)
- Danny "Smiles" Francis, 27, Montreal, QC (Hometown: Montreal, QC)
- Matthew Stowe, 30, Cloverdale, BC (Hometown: Surrey, BC)

== Contestant Progress ==
No.	Contestant	1	2	3	4	5	6	7	8	9	10	11	12	13
No.	Quickfire; Winner	Fred^{1}, Geoff^{1}, Jonathan^{1}, Nicole^{1}	Jonathan	Dan	Chris C	Nicole	Smiles	Smiles	Becky^{7}	Dennis	Dennis	Jonathan	Dennis	—N/a^{9}
1	Matthew	WIN	WIN	IN	IN	HIGH	WIN	HIGH	WIN	WIN	WIN	HIGH	LOW	WINNER
2	Smiles	IN	IN	IN	IN^{4}	IN	HIGH	WIN	LOW	HIGH	HIGH	LOW	HIGH	RUNNER-UP
3	Jonathan	IN	IN^{2}	IN	IN^{4}	IN	IN	LOW	WIN	WIN	LOW	WIN	WIN	THIRD PLACE ^{9}
4	Dennis	IN	OUT			IN^{6}	IN	IN	LOW	HIGH	HIGH	HIGH	OUT	
5	Nicole	IN	IN	WIN	IN^{4}	WIN	LOW	IN	LOW	LOW	LOW	OUT		
6	Geoff	IN	IN	IN	IN^{4}	LOW	WIN	IN	WIN	LOW	OUT			
7	Caity	IN	LOW	HIGH	IN^{5}	WIN	LOW	HIGH	WIN	OUT				
8	Becky	HIGH	HIGH	IN	WIN^{5}	HIGH	LOW	IN	WD^{8}					
9	Rory	IN	IN	IN	IN^{5}	LOW	IN	OUT						
9	Chris S.	IN	HIGH	HIGH	IN^{5}	LOW	IN	OUT						
11	Chris C.	LOW	WIN	IN	HIGH^{5}	IN	OUT							
12	Dan	HIGH	LOW	LOW^{3}	IN^{4}	OUT								
13	Kayla	LOW	IN	LOW	OUT^{4}									
14	Clement	IN	IN	OUT										
15	Ruth	IN	OUT											
16	Fred	OUT												

^Note 1 : Did not gain immunity.
^Note 2 : For winning immunity in the quickfire, Jonathan did not participate in the elimination challenge.
^Note 3 : Although in the bottom, Dan had won immunity in the quickfire challenge, so he was not eligible to be eliminated.
^Note 4 : Kayla had decided not to bring any of her team members with her to judges' table, thus automatically eliminating her.
^Note 5 : Only Kayla and Chris C, the team captains, were called to judges' table. Chris C, the winning captain, was told by the judges that Becky had made the best dish and won the elimination challenge.
^Note 6 : Following the Quickfire, Dennis was permitted back into the competition.
^Note 7 : Starting from this quickfire, immunity is no longer available.
^Note 8 : As the captain of the losing team, Becky declared that she would withdraw from the competition, assuming that she would be eliminated anyway.
^Note 9 : The finale Quickfire was a High Stakes Quickfire with the losing chef being eliminated. No winner was announced for the Quickfire.

(WINNER) The chef won the season and was crowned Top Chef.
(RUNNER-UP) The chef was a runner-up for the season.
(THIRD-PLACE) The chef placed third in the competition.
(WIN) The chef won that episode's Elimination Challenge.
(HIGH) The chef was selected as one of the top entries in the Elimination Challenge, but did not win.
(LOW) The chef was selected as one of the bottom entries in the Elimination Challenge, but was not eliminated.
(OUT) The chef lost that week's Elimination Challenge and was out of the competition.
(IN) The chef neither won nor lost that week's Elimination Challenge. They also were not up to be eliminated.
(WITHDRAW) The chef withdrew from the competition.

== Episodes ==
The format of season three followed that of the first two seasons and of the original American Top Chef. As before, each week features a guest judge or special guest.

No. overall	No. in season	Title	Original release date
27	1	"My First Dish"	March 18, 2013
Quickfire Challenge: The chefs will be separated into 4 teams. The teams must shuck 12 oysters, prepare 150 grams of mirepoix, segment 4 lemons, and clean & prepare beef tenderloin.; WINNER: Fred, Geoff, Jonathan, Nicole; Elimination Challenge: The chefs must recreate the first dish that inspired them to become a top chef.; WINNER: Matthew (Slow Poached Chicken Breast, Thigh Roulade, Pommes Fondant and Carrot Puree); ELIMINATED: Fred (Honey and Mustard Sous Vide Chicken, Forked Carrots, Glazed Turnips, and Turnip Slaw); Guest Judge: Chuck Hughes (elimination only)
28	2	"Down on the Farm"	March 25, 2013
Quickfire Challenge: The chefs must create a dish using at least 2 ingredients found in an MRE.; Top: Jonathan, Matthew, Caity; Bottom: Geoff, Chris S; WINNER: Jonathan; Elimination Challenge: In pairs, the chefs must create dishes using ingredients from Riverdale farm. One member will find ingredients from a scavenger hunt, while the other will buy the ingredients from the Top Chef mobile pantry. This is a high-stakes challenge and two chefs will be eliminated.; WINNER: Green Team (Matthew and Chris C) (Pan Roasted Quail Breast, Confit Leg and Leek Ragout, Celery Root Puree and Yellow Plum Jus); ELIMINATED: Dennis of Team Grey (Butter Poached Lobster, Corn Succotash and Tempura Zucchini Blossoms) (paired with Dan) and Ruth of Team Purple (Smoked Mushroom Stock and Poached Quail Egg) (paired with Caity); Guest Judge: Les Stroud (quickfire only), Robert Irvine (elimination only)
29	3	"The Category is Food"	April 1, 2013
Quickfire Challenge: The chefs were asked to create a vegan dish.; Top: Dan, Becky, Caity; Bottom: Chris S, Kayla, Rory; WINNER: Dan; Elimination Challenge: The chefs must create a dish for a café, bar, or dining room; Teams: Café: Dan, Jonathan, Matthew, Nicole, Bar: Becky, Clement, Geoff, Chris S; Dining Room: Caity, Chris C, Danny, Kayla, Rory; WINNER: Nicole (Handmade Pappardelle with Mushrooms and Truffle Oil); ELIMINATED: Clement (Duck and Goat Cheese Ravioli with Orange Sauce and Apple Watercress Salad); Guest Judge: George Stroumboulopoulos (quickfire only), Daniel Boulud (elimination only)
30	4	"The Roller Derby Smackdown"	April 8, 2013
High Stakes Quickfire Challenge: The chefs must create their own take on a coffee shop staple - the donut. In addition to immunity, the winner will receive $5,000.; Top: Chris C, Nicole, Becky; Bottom: Geoff, Dan, Kayla; WINNER: Chris C; Elimination Challenge: The chefs need to create a healthy and balanced meal for a local roller derby match.; WINNER: Becky (Summer Fruit and Ginger Crumble with Honey Yogurt); ELIMINATED: Kayla (Chimichurri Marinated Flank Steak with Avocado Dressing); Guest Judges: Devin Connell (quickfire only), Elizabeth Falkner and Trish Stratus (elimination only)
31	5	"A Day at the Ballet"	April 15, 2013
Quickfire Challenge: The chefs had to prepare a dish in less than the 11 minutes that it took Mark McEwan to make his (11 minutes and 17 seconds). The five eliminated chefs (Fred, Dennis, Ruth, Clement, and Kayla) will also compete in the quickfire, although they will not compete for immunity, unlike the remaining chefs.; WINNER: Nicole (immunity) and Dennis (re-entry); Elimination Challenge: The chefs were paired up and each team had to create a canape for a cocktail party thrown for the students and parents of Canada's National Ballet School. The chefs were told that their dishes had to be based on the ballet they were assigned (either Romeo and Juliet, Swan Lake, Cinderella, The Nutcracker, Sleeping Beauty, or Giselle).; WINNER: Nicole and Caity (Scallop and Crab Mousse Tempura with Prawn and Pickled Ginger Aioli); ELIMINATED: Dan (Hazelnut Shortbread with Orange Coulis and Shaved Dark Chocolate) (paired with Rory); Guest Judge: Rex Harrington (elimination only)
32	6	"Here Comes The Bride"	April 22, 2013
Quickfire Challenge: The chefs have 50 Top Chef bucks to buy food in an auction and make a cost-effective dish.; Top: Dennis, Danny; Bottom: Chris C, Becky, Jonathan; WINNER: Danny; Elimination Challenge: The chefs must work in teams of two and create a five course tasting menu inspired by Mumbai, Paris, Vancouver, Milan, and Napa Valley for a wedding shower for Lisa Ray. Danny, the winner of the quickfire challenge, will be in charge of the service and the amuse-bouche.; WINNER: Matthew and Geoff (Curried Cauliflower Soup with Currants, Dried Apricots and Balsamic Dressing) (Both chefs received $3,000 each for winning.); ELIMINATED: Chris C (Brown Butter Hazelnut Cake with Sautéed Peaches and Vanilla Bean Crème) (paired with Nicole); Guest Judge: Andrea Nicholson (elimination only)
33	7	"Our New National Dish"	April 29, 2013
Quickfire Challenge: The chefs put their taste buds to the test in a head-to-head taste-off.; Eliminated Round 1: Nicole, Becky, Caity, Geoff, Rory; Eliminated Round 2: Dennis, Matthew, Jonathan; Eliminated Round 3: Chris S; WINNER: Danny; High Stakes Elimination Challenge: The chefs must come up with their take on what Canada's New National Dish should be. The winner will receive a $10,000 cash prize.; WINNER: Danny (Shrimp and Crab Roll with Maple Bacon and House Smoked BBQ Chips); ELIMINATED: Chris S (Beer Cheese and Pickle Sandwich) and Rory (Pulled Pork Slider with Sweet Onion Sauce and Apple Bacon Slaw); Guest Judge: David Rocco
34	8	"Restaurant Wars"	May 6, 2013
Quickfire Challenge: The chefs need to create their take on a frozen pizza.; Top: Becky, Dennis; Bottom: Caity, Matthew; WINNER: Becky; Elimination Challenge: The chefs are split into two teams and will battle it out for the best restaurant concept and execution. The winning team will receive $25,000.; WINNING TEAM: Noir (Caity, Matthew, Jonathan, Geoff); LOSING TEAM: Osteria Ceci (Becky, Nicole, Danny, Dennis); CONCEDED: Becky; Guest Judge: Massimo Capra (quickfire only), Normand Laprise (elimination only)
35	9	"Chefs on Safari"	May 13, 2013
Quickfire Challenge: The chefs must create a dish inspired by a classic cocktail.; Top:Jonathan, Dennis; Bottom: Nicole, Danny; WINNER: Dennis; Elimination Challenge: The chefs head to the Toronto Zoo where they work as a team to create a special tasting menu inspired by different regions and animals.; WINNERS: Jonathan and Matthew; ELIMINATED: Caity; Guest Judge: Michael Voltaggio (elimination only)
36	10	"The Indian Feast"	May 20, 2013
Quickfire Challenge: The chefs are met by an airport bus that takes them to Pearson airport. They are taken to the tarmac where they have to create a dish based on a destination served by the airport. They pick suitcases to determine the destination. The winner gets a trip to Bali, Indonesia.; Top: Geoff, Dennis; Bottom: Danny, Jonathan; WINNER: Dennis; Elimination Challenge: The chefs have to cook a six-course Indian feast. The chefs have to prepare a dish inspired by a specific region in India, which is inside their luggage.; WINNERS: Matthew; ELIMINATED: Geoff; Guest Judge: Vikram Vij, Russell Peters (elimination only)
37	11	"Here Come the Wives"	May 27, 2013
Quickfire Challenge: The chefs are challenged by The Real Housewives of Vancouver star Jody Claman to create decadent desserts.; Top: Matthew, Jonathan; Bottom: Dennis, Nicole; WINNER: Jonathan; Elimination Challenge: The chefs are asked to prepare a garden party for Claman and other Housewives from Vancouver in the Bridle Path neighbourhood of Toronto. They have to create two unique bite-size canapés using unique and luxurious ingredients. The winning chef will win $10,000.; WINNER: Jonathan (Dungeness Crab Salad & Shaved Truffle, Handmade Ricotta Tortellini with White Truffle Cream Sauce); ELIMINATED: Nicole (Caviar & St. Simon Oyster with Crème Fraîche & Champagne Melon Vinaigrette, Osteria Caviar & Deviled Quail Egg); Guest Judge: Jody Claman (Quickfire & Elimination)
38	12	"Up in the Air"	June 3, 2013
Quickfire Challenge: The chefs are challenged to create two burgers, their take on a classic burger and also create an "Ultimate" burger.; Top: Jonathan, Dennis; Bottom: Matthew, Danny; WINNER: Dennis; Elimination Challenge: The chefs are challenged to create two dishes to be served for Air Canada's Executive First Service. The chefs will have to pre-prep their meals in the Top Chef kitchen and then cook and serve them on an Air Canada Boeing 767.; WINNER: Jonathan; ELIMINATED: Dennis; Guest Judge: Charlie Palmer (Quickfire & Elimination)
39	13	"Wild Rose Finale"	June 10, 2013
Quickfire Challenge: In a surprise twist, the final three chefs are required to create their own food truck and serve two dishes. This was a High Stakes Quickfire with the loser being eliminated from the competition. Each chef was teamed up with a former contestant from the season; Matthew with Nicole, Danny with Geoff and Jonathan with Chris S.; WINNER: None Announced; ELIMINATED: Jonathan; Elimination Challenge: Creating a five-course meal representing who the contestants are as chefs. They will have to have one dish that represents Calgary, the host city. The dinner will be held at Rush Restaurant in Calgary. It is a head-to-head competition where previous progress in the competition will be forgotten. Whoever wins the head-to-head wins Top Chef Canada. Former Top Chef Canada winners Dale Mackay and Carl Heinrich served as Danny and Matthew's sous chefs respectively.; Top Chef Canada: Matthew Stowe; Guest Judges: Connie DeSousa, Jann Arden and Lance Hurtubise (owner of Rush). (Elimination)
