= List of Top Chef Canada episodes =

Top Chef Canada is the Canadian spin-off of the American reality competition television series Top Chef which premiered on 11 April 2011, on Food Network Canada. The show features chefs competing against each other in various culinary challenges. They are judged by a panel of professional chefs and other notables from the food and wine industry with one or more contestants eliminated in each episode.

== Series overview ==
Season	Episodes	Originally released	
Season	Episodes	First released	Last released
1	13	April 11, 2011	July 4, 2011
2	13	March 12, 2012	May 28, 2012
3	13	March 18, 2013	June 10, 2013
4	10	March 10, 2014	May 12, 2014
5	10	April 7, 2017	July 4, 2017
6	8	April 8, 2018	May 28, 2018
7	8	April 1, 2019	May 20, 2019
8	8	April 13, 2020	June 1, 2020
9	8	April 19, 2021	June 7, 2021
10	8	September 26, 2022	November 14, 2022
11	8	October 14, 2024	December 2, 2024
12	8	October 14, 2025	December 2, 2025

== Episodes ==
=== Season 1 (2011) ===
No. overall	No. in season	Title	Original release date
1	1	"Getting To Know You"	April 11, 2011
2	2	"Cheese, Glorious Cheese"	April 18, 2011
3	3	"From Russia with Vodka"	April 25, 2011
4	4	"Food From Around The World"	May 2, 2011
5	5	"Pork to the People"	May 9, 2011
6	6	"The French Feast"	May 16, 2011
7	7	"Life's Little Milestones"	May 23, 2011
8	8	"Restaurant Wars"	May 30, 2011
9	9	"The Numbers Game"	June 6, 2011
10	10	"A Day in the Life of Canadian Food"	June 13, 2011
11	11	"Surf and Turf"	June 20, 2011
12	12	"Chef Mark McEwan's Favorite Things"	June 27, 2011
13	13	"Finale"	July 4, 2011

=== Season 2 (2012) ===
No. overall	No. in season	Title	Original release date
14	1	"Home Is Where The Heart Is"	March 12, 2012
15	2	"Building A Home For Friends"	March 19, 2012
16	3	"Here Comes the Stork"	March 26, 2012
17	4	"Isn't It Offal?"	April 2, 2012
18	5	"Food Through Time"	April 9, 2012
19	6	"Restaurant Wars"	April 16, 2012
20	7	"A Classic Deconstruction"	April 23, 2012
21	8	"Lights, Camera, Action!"	April 30, 2012
22	9	"Into The Wild"	May 7, 2012
23	10	"Show Us Your Soul"	May 14, 2012
24	11	"The Italian Feast"	May 21, 2012
25	12	"Food Meets Fashion"	May 28, 2012
26	13	"Finale"	June 4, 2012

=== Season 3 (2013) ===
No. overall	No. in season	Title	Original release date
27	1	"My First Dish"	March 18, 2013
28	2	"Down on the Farm"	March 25, 2013
29	3	"The Category is Food"	April 1, 2013
30	4	"The Roller Derby Smackdown"	April 8, 2013
31	5	"A Day at the Ballet"	April 15, 2013
32	6	"Here Comes The Bride"	April 22, 2013
33	7	"Our New National Dish"	April 29, 2013
34	8	"Restaurant Wars"	May 6, 2013
35	9	"Chefs on Safari"	May 13, 2013
36	10	"The Indian Feast"	May 20, 2013
37	11	"Here Come the Wives"	May 27, 2013
38	12	"Up in the Air"	June 3, 2013
39	13	"Wild Rose Finale"	June 10, 2013

=== Season 4 (2014) ===
No. overall	No. in season	Title	Original release date
40	1	"The Battle Of The Sexes"	March 10, 2014
41	2	"The World According To Chang"	March 17, 2014
42	3	"Five Alarm Fire"	March 24, 2014
43	4	"Chefs, Start Your Engines"	March 31, 2014
44	5	"Game, Set, Match"	April 7, 2014
45	6	"Restaurant Wars"	April 14, 2014
46	7	"Lords And Ladies At The Castle"	April 21, 2014
47	8	"School's Out For The Chefs"	April 28, 2014
48	9	"The Science Of Food"	May 5, 2014
49	10	"The Finale's Taboo"	May 12, 2014

=== Season 5 (2017) ===
No. overall	No. in season	Title	Original release date
50	1	"All-Stars Assemble"	April 2, 2017
51	2	"Markets of the World...Unite"	April 9, 2017
52	3	"Feast from the Middle East"	April 16, 2017
53	4	"Meals Made in Canada"	April 23, 2017
54	5	"Retail Wars!"	April 30, 2017
55	6	"Happy Birthday Canada!"	May 7, 2017
56	7	"Ice Cream, You Scream, All Aboard!"	May 14, 2017
57	8	"Pleased to Deceive You"	May 21, 2017
58	9	"Final Four Showdown"	May 28, 2017
59	10	"All-Stars Finale"	June 4, 2017

=== Season 6 (2018) ===
No. overall	No. in season	Title	Original release date
60	1	"The Next Wave"	April 8, 2018
61	2	"What Came First…The Chicken or the Immunity?"	April 15, 2018
62	3	"Qué Rico"	April 22, 2018
63	4	"Restaurant Wars!"	April 29, 2018
64	5	"Double Overtime"	May 6, 2018
65	6	"That’s a Whole Lotta Dough!"	May 13, 2018
66	7	"Wine of the Tiger"	May 20, 2018
67	8	"Finale Four Ways"	May 27, 2018

=== Season 7 (2019) ===
No. overall	No. in season	Title	Original release date
68	1	"The Contenders"	April 1, 2019
69	2	"Bring On the Mimosas Baby"	April 8, 2019
70	3	"Restaurant Wars"	April 15, 2019
71	4	"The Nordic Feast"	May 4, 2020
72	5	"The Battle of Bao"	May 11, 2020
73	6	"What Goes Up Must Come Down"	May 6, 2019
74	7	"It's a Family Affair"	May 13, 2019
75	8	"Winner Takes All"	May 20, 2019

=== Season 8 (2020) ===
No. overall	No. in season	Title	Original release date
76	1	"A Dish for a New Decade"	April 13, 2020
77	2	"It's a BBQ Party"	April 20, 2020
78	3	"Grab and Go!"	April 27, 2020
79	4	"Drag Brunch"	May 4, 2020
80	5	"Castle Cook-Off"	May 11, 2020
81	6	"Bring the Funk"	May 18, 2020
82	7	"Eat Your Veggies"	May 25, 2020
83	8	"Final Showdown"	June 1, 2020

=== Season 9 (2021) ===
No. overall	No. in season	Title	Original release date
84	1	"Phoenix Rising"	April 19, 2021
85	2	"Harvest Picnic"	April 20, 2021
86	3	"Holiday Potluck"	May 3, 2021
87	4	"Takeout Wars"	May 10, 2021
88	5	"Eat Local"	May 17, 2021
89	6	"Indigenous Ingredients"	May 24, 2021
90	7	"Game, Set, Match"	May 31, 2021
91	8	"A Winner Rises"	June 7, 2021

=== Season 10 (2022) ===
No. overall	No. in season	Title	Original release date
92	1	"Welcome to Season X"	September 26, 2022
93	2	"Backstage Bites"	October 3, 2022
94	3	"Restaurant Wars"	October 10, 2022
95	4	"Soccer Fever"	October 17, 2022
96	5	"Vegan Feast"	October 24, 2022
97	6	"Date Night"	October 31, 2022
98	7	"Welcome to the Cayman Islands"	November 7, 2022
99	8	"Canada's Top Chef Is..."	November 14, 2022

=== Season 11 (2024) ===
No. overall	No. in season	Title	Original release date
100	1	"Chaos Menu"	October 14, 2024
101	2	"Firsts"	October 21, 2024
102	3	"The Feast of Toronto"	October 28, 2024
103	4	"The Gala Fundraiser"	November 4, 2024
104	5	"Taste of the Terroir"	November 11, 2024
105	6	"Flavours of the Future"	November 18, 2024
106	7	"Lights Camera Cooking"	November 25, 2024
107	8	"The Curtain Call"	December 2, 2024

=== Season 12 (2025) ===
No. overall	No. in season	Title	Original release date
108	1	"Origin Stories"	October 14, 2025
109	2	"Film Fest"	October 21, 2025
110	3	"Bocuse D’or Showdown"	October 28, 2025
111	4	"Top Chef Canada Pride Party"	November 4, 2025
112	5	"Immersive Dinning"	November 11, 2025
113	6	"Pull up a Chair"	November 18, 2025
114	7	"Time vs Money"	November 25, 2025
115	8	"One Night Only"	December 2, 2025
