= Dale MacKay =

Canadian chef

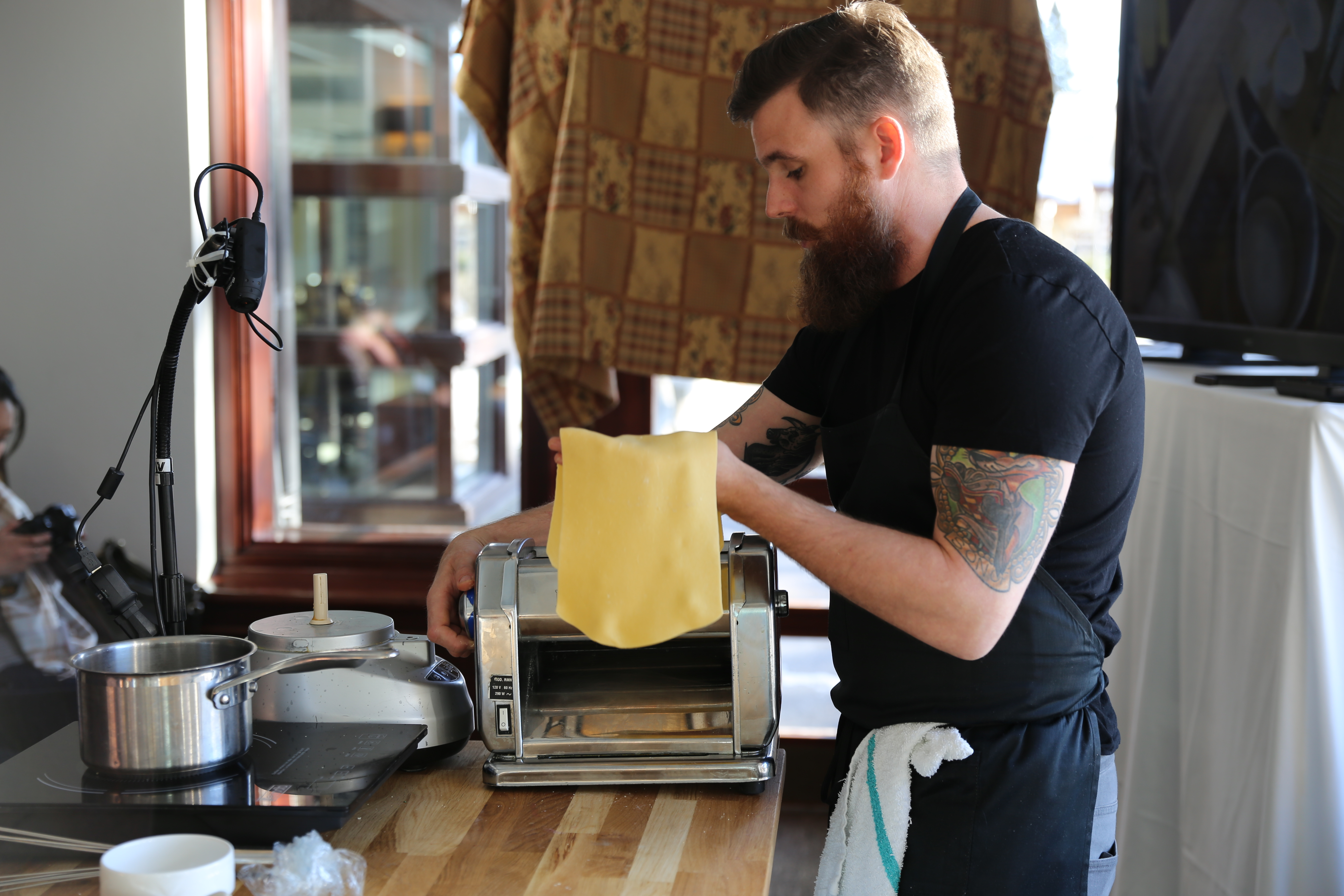
- MacKay in 2014
- Born: Saskatoon, Saskatchewan
- Culinary career
- Current restaurants
- Little Grouse on the Prairie, Saskatoon; Avenue, Regina
- Previous restaurants
- ensemble, Vancouver (2011-2012) ensembleTap, Vancouver (2011-2012); Home Slice Pizza Shoppe, Saskatoon (2015-2016); Ayden Kitchen and Bar, Saskatoon (2013-2023); Sticks and Stones, Saskatoon (2017-2023); F&B Restaurant, Saskatoon (2023-2024)
- Television shows
- Top Chef Canada (season 1); Iron Chef Gauntlet (season 2); Wall of Chefs; Fire Masters

Dale MacKay is a Canadian chef and the winner of the first season of Top Chef Canada in 2011.

MacKay first entered the food industry as a fry cook in Vancouver, British Columbia. In the early 2000s, he moved to London, England, where he got a job at Gordon Ramsay's Claridge's, later moving to other Ramsay restaurants in London, Tokyo and New York City. He later became executive chef at Daniel Boulud's Lumière restaurant in Vancouver, following the departure of Rob Feenie from the establishment in 2007, until its closure in 2011.

He opened his own pair of restaurants, ensemble and ensembleTap, in 2011. He won the Top Chef Canada title soon afterward, investing his prize money in the venues, but closed them in 2012 after determining that rental costs in downtown Vancouver were too expensive for them to become profitable.

He made a return appearance on Top Chef Canada in 2013, acting as sous chef to third season finalist Danny Francis.

In early 2013, MacKay announced that he was returning to his hometown of Saskatoon, Saskatchewan to open a new restaurant. The restaurant, named Ayden Kitchen & Bar, opened on November 15, 2013 and operated until July 8, 2023. He is currently the owner of two restaurants: Little Grouse on the Prairie (Italian) in Saskatoon, and Avenue Restaurant in Regina. He also owned three other restaurants in Saskatoon: Sticks and Stones (Korean), F&B Restaurant, and Home Slice Pizza Shoppe.

MacKay competed on the second season of Iron Chef Gauntlet, where he was eliminated in the second round.

In 2019 he began appearing as a rotating judge on the BBQ competition series Fire Masters, which airs in Canada on Food Network and in the US on Cooking Channel.

In 2020 he appeared as a judge on the Food Network competition series Wall of Chefs.

In 2023, MacKay competed against 15 other chefs in Top Chef: World All-Stars, placing tenth.

== Filmography ==
Year	Title	Role	Notes
2011	The Vancouver Recipe	Himself	Documentary
2011-2017	Top Chef Canada	Contestant / Judge	16 episodes
2018	Iron Chef Gauntlet	Contestant	—N/a
2019-2020	Fire Masters	Judge	3 episodes
2020	Wall of Chefs	Judge	—N/a
2023	Top Chef: World All-Stars	Contestant	—N/a
