= Top Chef Canada =

Canadian reality television series

- Genre: Reality competition; Cooking show
- Presented by: Thea Andrews; Lisa Ray; Eden Grinshpan
- Judges: Mark McEwan; Shereen Arazm; Mijune Pak; Janet Zuccarini; Chris Nuttall-Smith; David Zilber
- Country of origin: Canada
- Original language: English
- No. of seasons: 12
- No. of episodes: 115 (list of episodes)

Production
- Executive producers: Barbara Bowlby; John Brunton
- Running time: 42 minutes
- Production companies: Insight Productions; Universal International Studios (2011-2026); Universal Global Television (2026-present)

Original release
- Network: Flavour Network
- Release: April 11, 2011 – present

Top Chef Canada is a Canadian reality competition television series. The show premiered in April 2011 on Food Network Canada (now Flavour Network). Like the original American series, a group of chefs compete against each other in various culinary challenges. They are judged by a panel of professional chefs and other notables from the food and wine industry, with one or more contestants eliminated in each episode. The winner receives a cash prize of CA$100,000, along with additional prizes that vary between seasons.

The thirteenth season premiered on October 20, 2026.

== Production ==
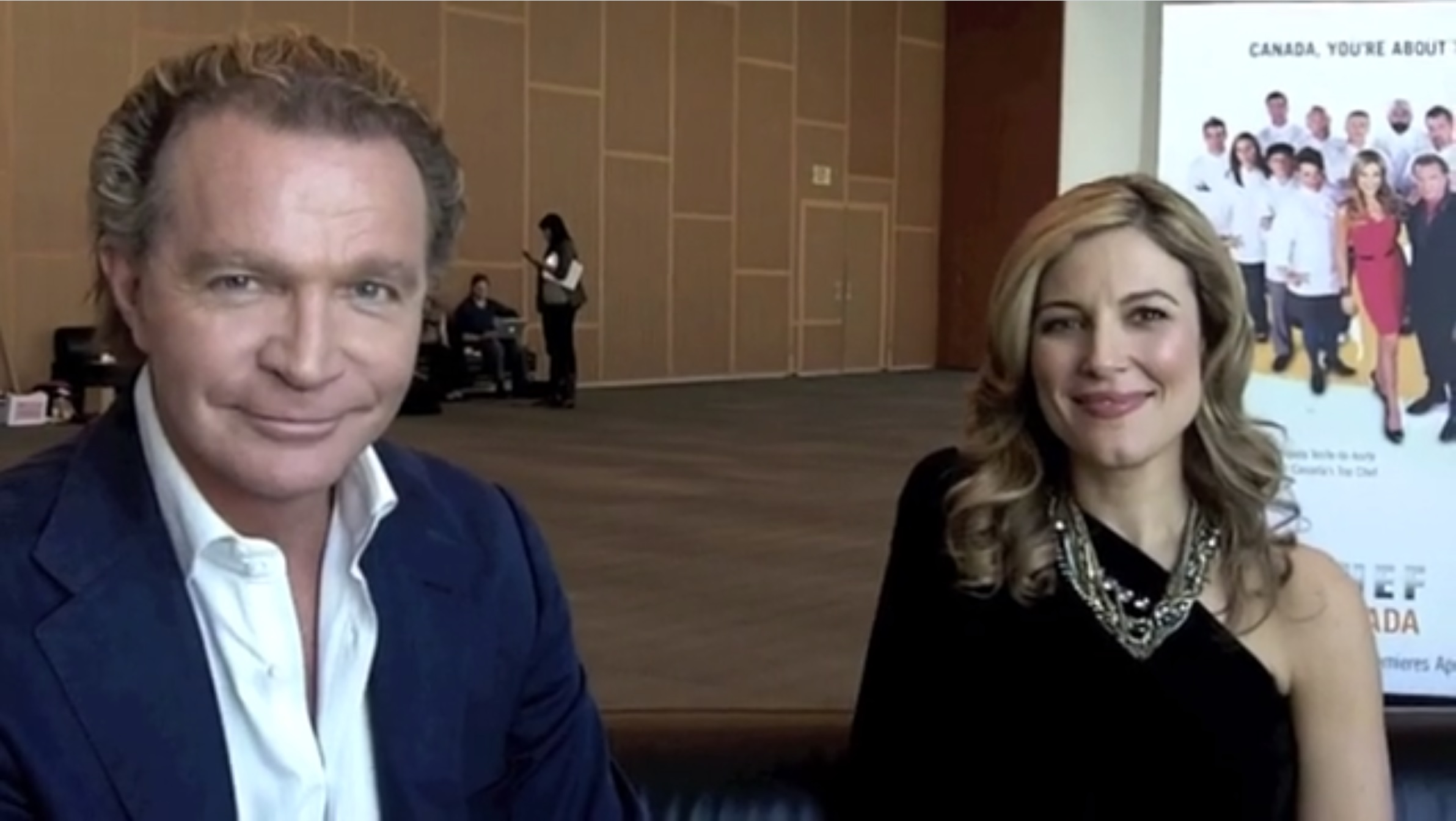
Mark McEwan and Thea Andrews discuss Top Chef Canada in 2011.

On April 21, 2010, Canwest Broadcasting announced it had struck a deal with NBCUniversal to create a Canadian adaptation of Top Chef with production company Insight Productions. The inaugural season debuted on April 11, 2011, hosted by television personality Thea Andrews with chef and restaurateur Mark McEwan as head judge. The "resident judge", the position held by Gail Simmons in the original American version, was Toronto native and restaurateur Shereen Arazm. After giving birth to her second child, Andrews stepped down from hosting duties and was replaced by actress and model Lisa Ray, beginning with the second season. The show was cancelled in 2014 after an initial four-season run.

On February 23, 2017, Food Network Canada announced a revival of the series. The fifth season, Top Chef Canada: All-Stars, premiered on April 2, 2017, featuring a new host, Eden Grinshpan. Season 5 also introduced three new resident judges: Chris Nuttall-Smith, Janet Zuccarini, and Mijune Pak. Another resident judge, David Zilber, was added in Season 10.

== Seasons ==
Season	Winner	Runner(s)-up		Air Dates
1	Dale MacKay	Rob Rossi		April 11 – July 4, 2011
2	Carl Heinrich	Trevor Bird		March 12 – May 28, 2012
3	Matthew Stowe	Danny "Smiles" Francis		March 18 – June 10, 2013
4	Rene Rodriguez	Terry Salmond		March 10 – May 12, 2014
5	Nicole Gomes	Dustin Gallagher		April 2 – June 4, 2017
6	Ross Larkin	Mark Singson		April 8 – May 27, 2018
7	Paul Moran	Phil Scarfone		April 1 – May 20, 2019
8	Francis Blais	Lucy Morrow	Stephanie Ogilvie	April 13 – June 1, 2020
9	Erica Karbelnik	Kym Nguyen		April 19 – June 7, 2021
10	Trevane "Tre" Sanderson	Deseree "Dez" Lo		September 26 – November 14, 2022
11	Chanthy Yen	Moira Murray		October 14 – December 2, 2024
12	Coulson Armstrong	Alex Kim		October 14 – December 2, 2025
13	TBA	TBA		October 20, 2026 – present
