= Amuse-bouche =

Bite-sized hors d'œuvre

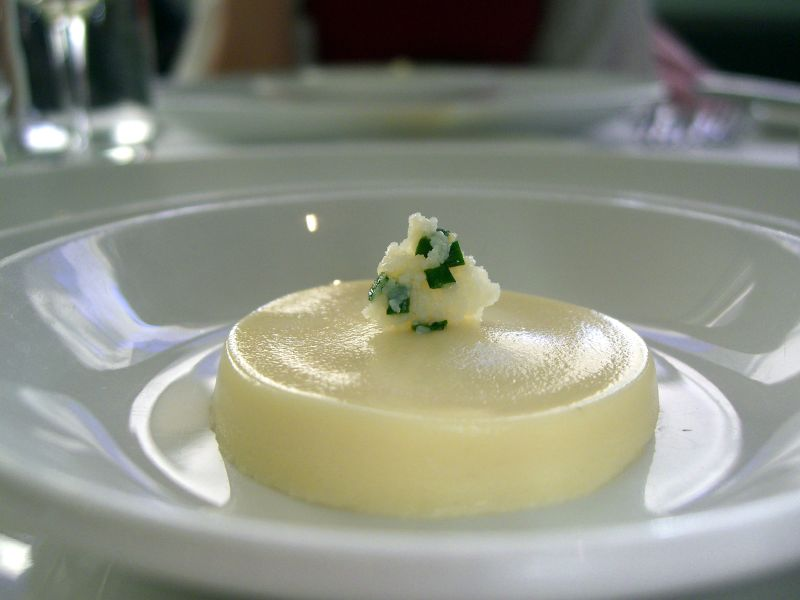
- A Parmesan panna cotta amuse-bouche
- Alternative names: Amuse-gueule
- Course: Hors d'oeuvre
- Place of origin: France

An amuse-bouche (/əˌmuːzˈbuːʃ/; French: [a.myz.buʃ]) or amuse-gueule (UK: /əˌmuːzˈɡɜːl/, US: /-ˈɡʌl/; French: [a.myz.ɡœl]) is a single, bite-sized hors d'œuvre. Amuse-bouches are different from appetizers in that they are not ordered from a menu by patrons but are served free and according to the chef's selection alone. These are served both to prepare the guest for the meal and to offer a glimpse of the chef's style.

The term is French and literally means "mouth amuser". The plural form may be amuse-bouche or amuse-bouches. In France, amuse-gueule is traditionally used in conversation and literary writing, while amuse-bouche is not even listed in most dictionaries, being a euphemistic hypercorrection that appeared in the 1980s on restaurant menus and used almost only there, although in the anglospherical daily vernacular, it is an abstract expression for any kind of luxurious exploit of decadence. (In French, bouche refers to the human mouth, while gueule means the wider mouth of an animal, e.g. dog, though commonly used for mouth and derogatory only in certain expressions, e.g. "ferme ta gueule".)

== In restaurants ==
The amuse-bouche emerged as an identifiable course during the nouvelle cuisine movement, which emphasized smaller, more intensely flavoured courses. It differs from other hors d'œuvres in that it is small, usually just one or two bites, preselected by the chef and offered free of charge to all present at the table.

The function of the amuse-bouche could be played by rather simple offerings, such as a plate of olives or a crock of tapenade. It often becomes a showcase, however, of the artistry and showmanship of the chef, intensified by the competition among restaurants. According to Jean-Georges Vongerichten, a popular New York celebrity chef with restaurants around the world, "The amuse-bouche is the best way for a great chef to express his or her big ideas in small bites".

At some point, the amuse-bouche transformed from an unexpected bonus to a de rigueur offering at Michelin Guide-starred restaurants and those aspiring to that category (as recently as 1999, The New York Times provided a parenthetical explanation of the course). This in turn created a set of logistical challenges for restaurants: amuse-bouche must be prepared in sufficient quantities to serve all guests, usually just after the order is taken or between main courses. This often requires a separate cooking station devoted solely to producing the course quickly as well as a large and varied collection of specialized china for serving the amuse. Interesting plates, demitasse cups, and large Asian-style soup spoons are popular choices. In addition, the kitchen must try to accommodate guests who have an aversion or allergy to ingredients in the amuse.

== Gallery ==
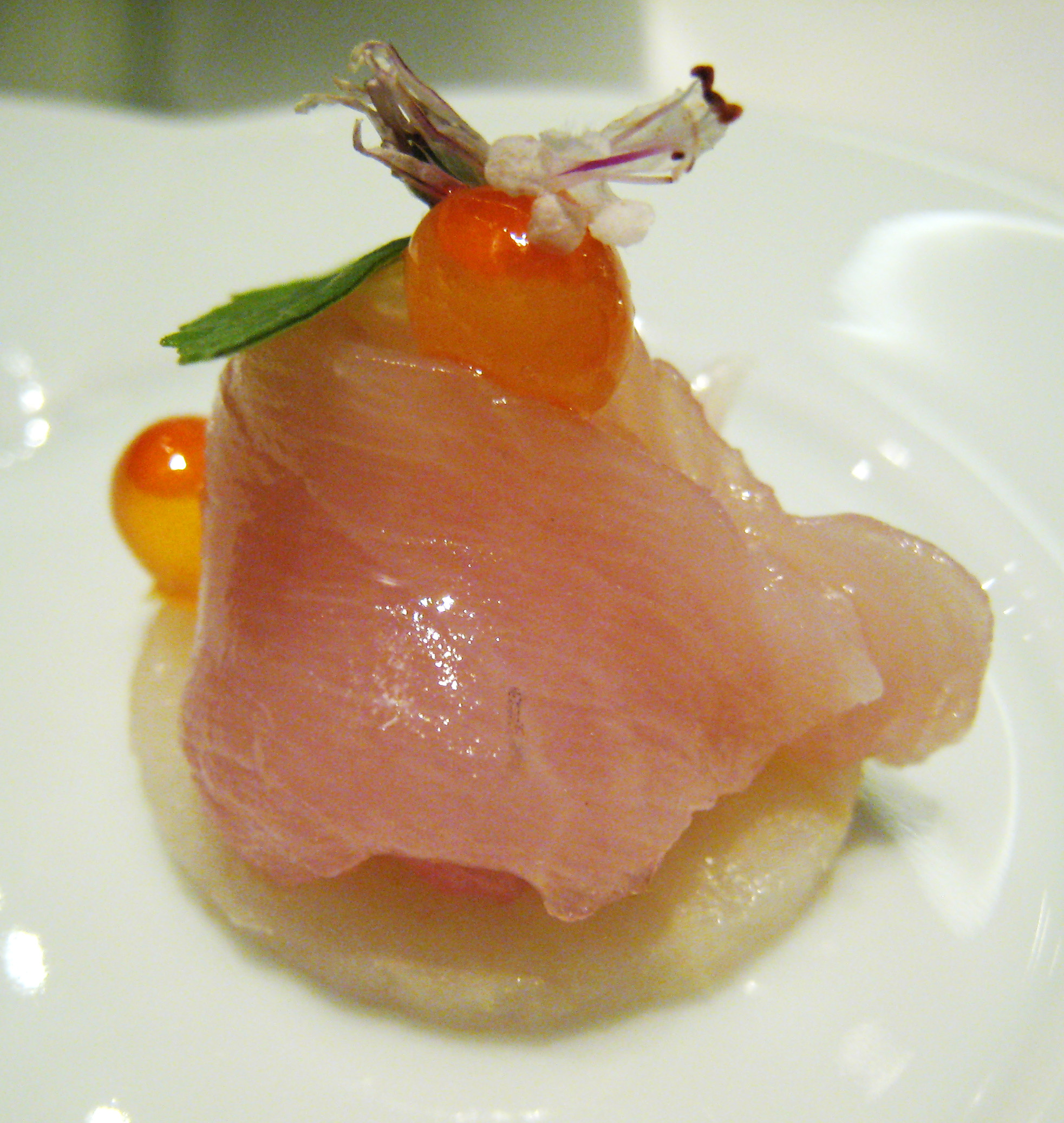
A Japanese-influenced amuse-bouche: hamachi, salmon roe, basil, basil flower

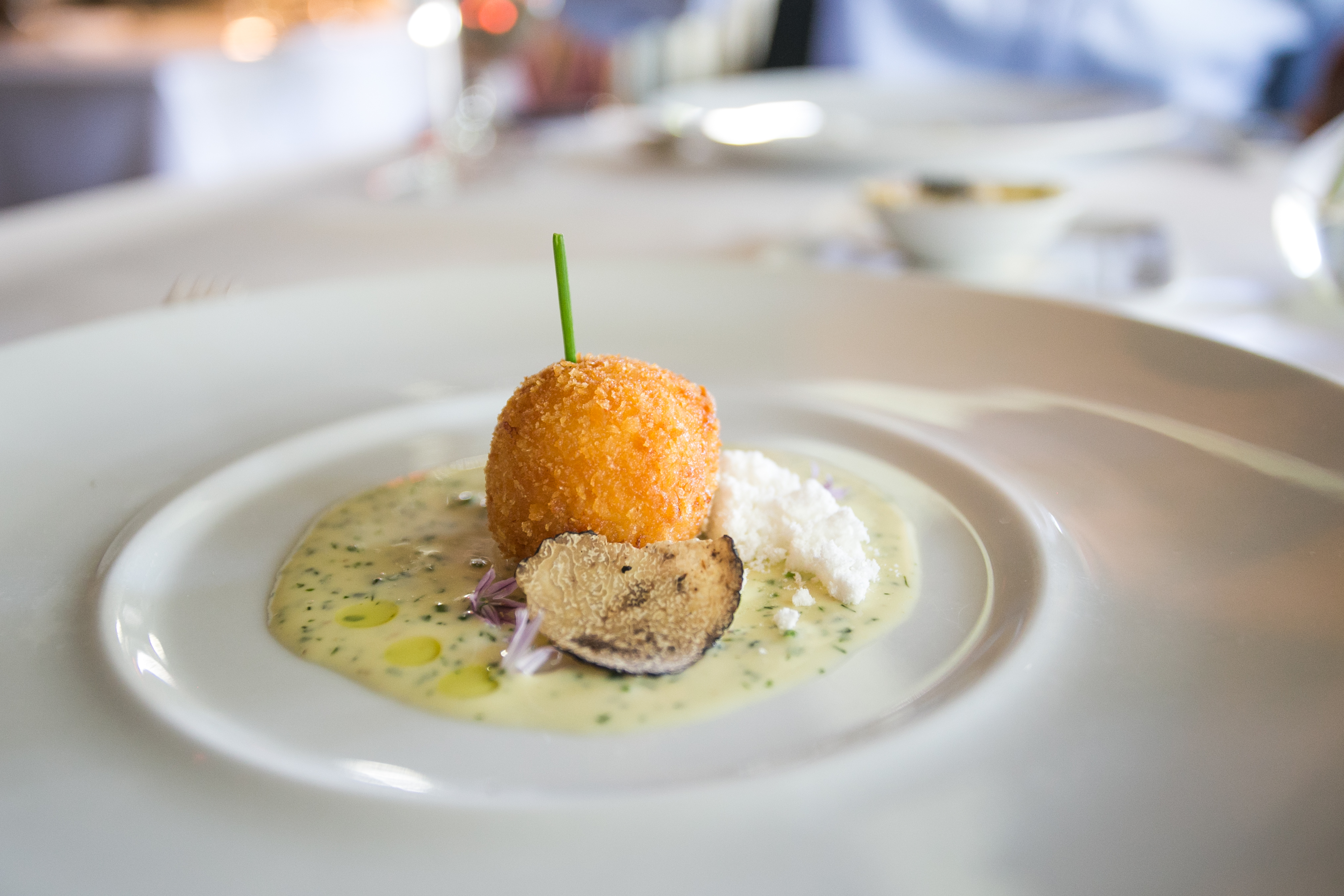
Amuse-bouche served at a French restaurant

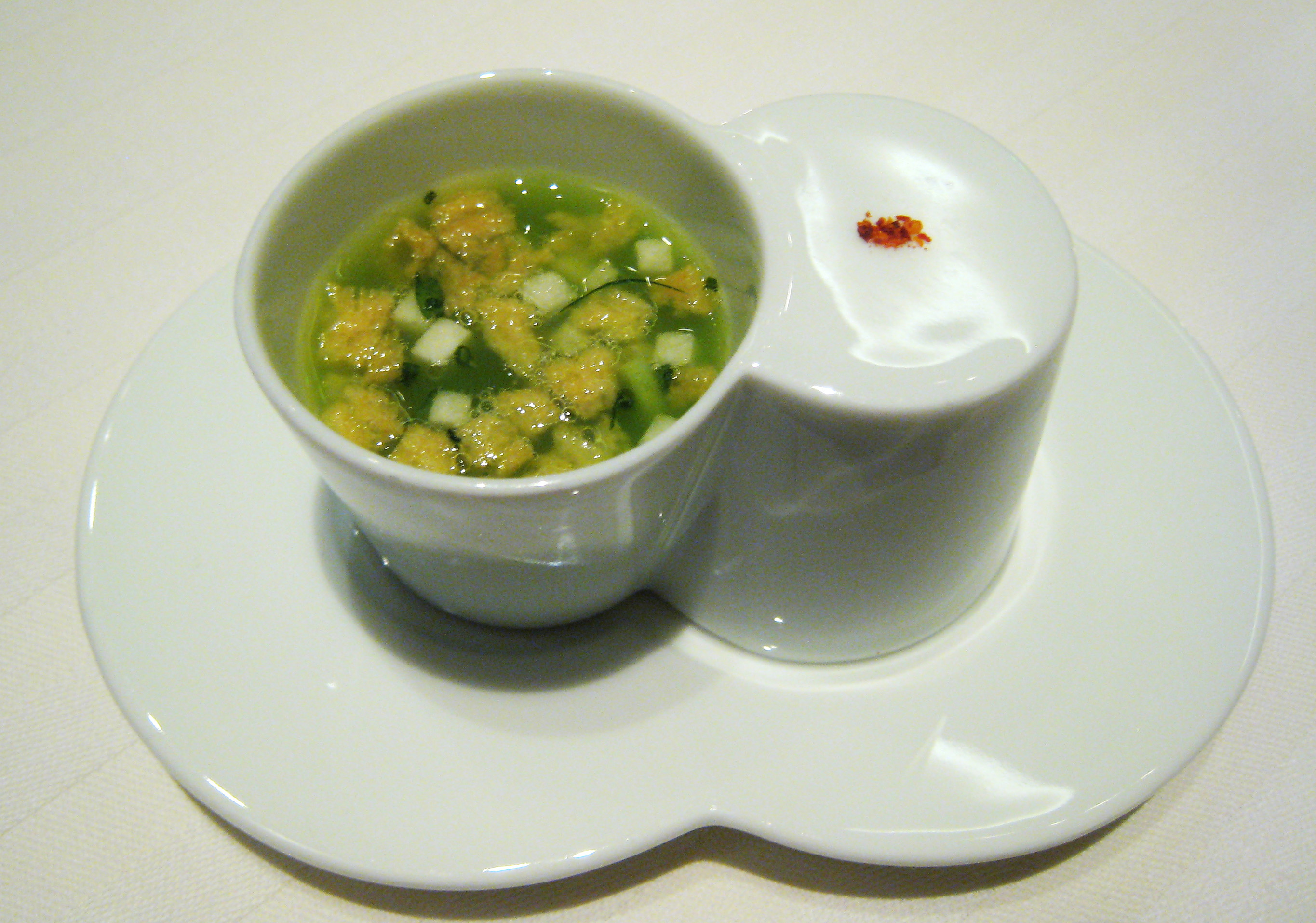
Celery soup with sauteed corn and jicama

== See also ==
- "Amuse-Bouche" (Hannibal)
- Apéritif and digestif
