= Eden Grinshpan =

Canadian cook and television host

- Born: Toronto, Ontario, Canada
- Occupation(s): Cook and television personality
- Known for: Host of Top Chef Canada
- Children: 2

Eden Grinshpan is a Canadian chef and television host based in Toronto, Ontario. She has hosted Top Chef Canada since 2017.

== Early life and education ==
Grinshpan was born and raised in Toronto, Ontario, Canada. She spent summers in Israel as a child. Grinshpan graduated from the Metropolitan Preparatory Academy in 2004. Grinshpan studied culinary arts at Le Cordon Blue in London, graduating in 2006.

== Career ==
Grinshpan co-created and hosted the television shows Eden Eats and Log On and Eat With Eden. Log On and Eat With Eden, which debuted on the Cooking Channel in 2013, features restaurants discovered by Grinshpan via food blogs and social media posts. Grinspahn launched the Middle-eastern inspired restaurant Dez in 2018 with Samantha Wasser. The Nolita-based restaurant closed in 2019.

Grinshpan has been the host of Top Chef Canada since 2017. Her first cookbook Eating Out Loud was published in 2020.

== Personal life ==
Grinshpan lives in Toronto, Ontario with her husband, Ido Nivron, and their two daughters.

== Publications ==
- Grinshpan, Eden (2020). Eating out loud : bold Middle Eastern flavors for all day, every day (First ed.). New York. ISBN 9780593135877.
