= Food Network (Canada) =

- Country: Canada
- Broadcast area: Nationwide
- Headquarters: Toronto, Ontario

Programming
- Language: English
- Picture format: 1080i (HDTV); 480i (SDTV)

Ownership
- Owner: Rogers Sports & Media (branding licensed from Skydance)
- Sister channels: Discovery Channel; HGTV; Investigation Discovery; Magnolia Network

History
- Launched: January 1, 2025; 22 months ago

Links
- Website: Food Network

Food Network is a Canadian exempt discretionary specialty channel owned by Rogers Sports & Media. Based on the U.S. cable network of the same name, it broadcasts programming related to food, cooking, cuisine, and the food industry.

== History ==
Food Network is one of five specialty networks that were relaunched by the Toronto-based Rogers on January 1, 2025, after the June 2024 announcement that it had acquired the rights to Warner Bros. Discovery (WBD) factual and lifestyle brands. The channel succeeds a previous iteration of Food Network that was majority-owned by Corus Entertainment; this channel rebranded as Flavour Network on December 30, 2024, with a programming slate that phases out first-run Food Network programs in favour of other acquisitions.

== Programming ==
In June 2025, Rogers announced its first slate of original programming for the channel, including Bake Master Battle (hosted by Breakfast Television anchor Dina Pugliese), a second Canadian version of British series Come Dine with Me, David Rocco's Eating Dirty, and Andy's East Coast Kitchen Crawl. The channel also co-commissioned a reboot of Food Network series Restaurant: Impossible, Restaurant Impossible: Last Call, starring Aarón Sánchez and Canadian restaurateur Jen Agg.
