= Top Chef Canada season 9 =

Canadian television show season

Top Chef Canada
- Season 9
- No. of contestants: 11
- Winner: Erica Karbelnik
- No. of episodes: 8

Release
- Original network: Food Network
- Original release: April 19 – June 7, 2021

Season chronology
- ← Previous; Season 8 Next → Season 10

The ninth season of the Canadian reality television series Top Chef Canada and was first broadcast on Food Network. The new season was first announced by Food Network Canada on March 31, 2021. The season was filmed in Toronto, Ontario and the finale was shot at the Four Seasons hotel in the city's downtown core. Season nine features 11 chefs of various backgrounds considered to be the next generation of culinary stars in Canada.

The season reflected on the impact of the COVID-19 pandemic on the food industry. Chefs wore masks when shopping for produce, travelling between destinations and during several challenges, which were adapted to follow pandemic restrictions, most notably with "Takeout Wars," an adaptation of the classic challenge "Restaurant Wars," where chefs conducted a takeout service instead of a pop-up restaurant, and where the Judges ate at resident judge Janet Zuccarini's own home.

Season 9 featured Eden Grinshpan again as host, and kept all of its mainstay judges, including Head Judge Mark McEwan, along with resident judges Chris Nuttall-Smith, Mijune Pak and Janet Zuccarini, who rotated through judging elimination challenges, with at least one resident judge present per episode, but at times featured two or all resident judges on some given episodes.

Top Chef Canada: Season 9 premiered on April 19, 2021, and concluded on June 7, 2021. In the season finale, Erika Kerbelnik was declared the winner over runner-up Kym Nguyen. For winning the competition, Karbelnik was awarded the grand prize of $100,000 (CAD) and a new Lexus branded vehicle.

== Contestants ==
Eleven chefs competed in season 9. Contestants are listed in the alphabetical order of their surnames.

- Galasa Aden, 27, Executive Chef, Calgary, AB
- Andrea Alridge, 30, Chef de Cuisine, Vancouver, BC
- Emily Butcher, 30, Chef de Cuisine, Winnipeg, MB
- Aicia Colacci, 40, Private Chef, Montreal, QC
- Siobhan Detkavich, 21, Chef de Partie, Kelowna, BC
- Jae-Anthony Dougan, 34, Executive Chef, Ottawa, ON
- Alex Edmonson, 28, Private Chef, Calgary, AB
- Erica Karbelnik, 30, Executive Chef, Toronto, ON
- Josh Karbelnik, 30, Chef de Cuisine, Toronto, ON
- Stéphane "Steph" Levac, 41, Executive Chef, Kentville, NS
- Kym Nguyen, 34, Sous Chef, Vancouver, BC

== Contestant progress ==
No.	Contestant	1	2	3	4	5	6	7	8
No.	Quickfire; Winner(s)	Erica	Galasa	Kym	Alex; Kym	—N/a	Josh	Josh	—N/a
1	Erica	HIGH	WIN	HIGH	LOW	IN	IN	LOW	WINNER
2	Kym	WIN	LOW	IN	WIN	WIN	WIN	HIGH	RUNNER-UP
3	Andrea	IN	LOW	HIGH	WIN	HIGH	HIGH	HIGH	OUT
3	Josh	HIGH	WIN	LOW	WIN	HIGH	LOW	WIN	OUT
5	Alex	LOW	IN	IN	LOW	LOW	HIGH	OUT	
6	Emily	IN	IN	WIN	LOW	LOW	OUT		
7	Aicia	IN	IN	LOW	WIN	OUT			
8	Galasa	IN	LOW	IN	OUT				
9	Siobhan	IN	WIN	OUT					
10	Jae-Anthony	IN	OUT						
11	Steph	OUT							

(WINNER) The chef won the season and was crowned Top Chef.
(RUNNER-UP) The chef was a runner-up for the season.
(WIN) The chef won that episode's Elimination Challenge.
(HIGH) The chef was selected as one of the top entries in the Elimination Challenge, but did not win.
(IMMUNE) The chef was immune from elimination, and exempted from cooking during this Elimination Challenge.
(LOW) The chef was selected as one of the bottom entries in the Elimination Challenge, but was not eliminated.
(OUT) The chef lost that week's Elimination Challenge and was eliminated from the competition.
(IN) The chef neither won nor lost that week's Elimination Challenge. They also were not up to be eliminated.

== Episodes ==
No. overall	No. in season	Title	Original release date
84	1	"Phoenix Rising"	April 19, 2021
The new crop of chefs get to know each other briefly in the Top Chef Canada kitchen before getting a short introduction from Host Eden Grinshpan and Head Judge Mark McEwan and being thrown directly into their first Quickfire Challenge. Quickfire Challenge: The chefs were given thirty minutes to create a dish that showcased their personal brand. The winner received immunity from elimination.: WINNER: Erica (Seared Scallops with Fennel Pistachio Puree and Pistachio & Za'atar Dukkah); Elimination Challenge: The chefs were tasked with creating a dish that showcased a component of fire using either a smoke, ash or flame element. The chefs cooked and served their dishes at the Casa Fuego restaurant in downtown Toronto.: WINNER: Kym (Roasted Squab Breast and Shishito Peppers with Lotus Root, Onion Soubise and Bordelaise Sauce); ELIMINATED: Steph (Spicy Wilted Greens with White Beans, Bison Rib-Eye with Spruce Tip Gastrique and Pickled Chanterelles)
85	2	"Harvest Picnic"	April 20, 2021
Quickfire Challenge: The chefs randomly picked a classic diner dish and were tasked to reimagine it using only plant based ingredients. The guest judges for the challenge were chef and restaurateur Suzanne Barr and Canadian radio personality George Stroumboulopoulos. The winner received immunity from elimination and got an advantage in the elimination challenge.: WINNER: Galasa (Mushroom "Meatloaf" with Caramelized Onion Puree, Spicy Greens and Croutons); Elimination Challenge: The chefs were divided into groups of three and were tasked with creating a cohesive picnic meal with portable, outdoor friendly dishes highlighting either apples, corn or pumpkin. As the winner of the quickfire challenge, Galasa chose which team he wanted to work with. The chefs had time to shop at a local farm for their featured produce before serving the judges at Toronto's Botanical Gardens. The guest judges for the challenge were chefs and owners of Montgomery's restaurant Guy Rawlings and Kim Montgomery Rawlings.: WINNERS: Team Pumpkin: Erica, Josh, Siobhan; LOSERS: Team Apple: Jae-Anthony, Kym, Galasa, Andrea; ELIMINATED Jae-Anthony (Bison Tartare with Haitian Green Seasoning, Apple Salsa and Smoked Gouda)
86	3	"Holiday Potluck"	May 3, 2021
Quickfire Challenge: The chefs were tasked with making a Top Chef quality dish using Quaker Oats branded oat flour. Each dish also had to have either a baked, flipped (using the griddle) or fried element. The winner received immunity in the elimination challenge along with a $5000 (CAD) cash prize from Quaker Oats. The guest judge for the challenge was chef and restaurateur Mandel Hitzer. This was the last challenge where immunity could be won from a quickfire challenge.: WINNER: Kym (Corn, Jalapeno & Cheddar Fritter with Corn Succotash); Elimination Challenge: The chefs were tasked to create a dish based on a holiday meal or food memory. The chefs served their dishes at the Old Mill Toronto restaurant, one of Toronto's longest running eateries. Guest judges included celebrity chef and TV host Christine Cushing and Quebecois entrepreneur and restaurant owner Stefano Faita.: WINNER: Emily (Cod with Baked Potato Gnocchi and Sauerkraut Beurre Blanc); ELIMINATED: Siobhan (French Toast, Lavender & Rose Petal Yogurt, Balsamic Strawberries, Cardamom Green Apples and Candied Bacon)
87	4	"Takeout Wars"	May 10, 2021
Quickfire Challenge: The chefs were given thirty five minutes to create a restaurant concept and one supporting dish for judges Mark McEwan and Janet Zuccarini. Two winners, chosen by Mark and Janet would come to life in "Takeout Wars," a spinoff of the classic Top Chef challenge Restaurant Wars. The two chefs who won would get to select their teams and manage the service of their concept.: WINNER #1: Kym (Dashi: Pan-Asian cuisine. Koji Orange Radishes with Hondashi Emulsion); WINNER #2: Alex (Root: Plant focused cuisine with minor meat components. Cauliflower Salad-Cauliflower Puree, Roasted Cauliflower and Shiitake XO.); Elimination Challenge: Kym and Alex became team captains and chose the other chefs they would like to have on their team.: Dashi: Kym, Josh, Andrea and Aicia; Root: Alex, Golasa, Erica and Emily; The teams were tasked with creating a menu that reflects their concept and conducting a ninety minute takeout service. The judges ate at resident judge Janet Zuccarini's house and were joined by guest judges Nuit and Jeff Regular. Dashi's menu: Kombu-Cured Tuna & Salmon Tartare with Hondashi Mayo and Lotus Root Chips (Kym, Appetizer); Mushroom Dumplings with Fermented Mushroom Dashi (Aicia, Appetizer); Japanese Green Curry with Seared Sole and Fresh Cucumber (Josh, Main Dish); Steamed Rice with Furikake (Andrea, Side Dish); Braised Pork Belly with Tea Egg and Asian Pear Kimchi (Andrea, Main Dish); Mango Panna Cotta with Coconut & Lime Tapioca (Josh, Dessert); Root's menu: Corn Arancini with Huitlacoche Aioli and Queso (Erica, Appetizer); Smoked King Oyster Mushrooms, Beets, Beet Hummus and Feta Mostarda (Emily, Appetizer); Eggplant Steak with Marinated Quinoa, Mushroom Demi-Glace and Chermoula (Galasa, Main Dish); Vadouvan Curry-Roasted Carrots with Cardamom Yogurt (Emily, Side Dish); Chocolate Avocado Pecan Tart with Candied Pecans and Parsnip Date Caramel (Alex, Dessert); WINNERS: Dashi: Kym, Josh, Andrea, Aicia; LOSERS: Root: Alex, Galasa, Erica, Emily; ELIMINATED: Galasa (Eggplant Steak with Marinated Quinoa, Mushroom Demi-Glace and Chermoula)
88	5	"Eat Local"	May 17, 2021
Quickfire Challenge: The three losing chefs from last week's challenge (Erica, Alex and Emily) were tasked with competing against three previously eliminated chefs (Galasa, Siobhan and Jae-Anthony) in a mise-en-place challenge to stay alive in the competition. The challenge included peeling fifteen cloves of garlic, breaking down two heads of cauliflower and skinning and deboning three chicken legs. The two in competition chefs who complete the challenge first will be safe while the last in competition chef will be forced to complete a sudden death cook off against the winning eliminated chef.: IN COMPETITION LOSER: Erica; ELIMINATED WINNER: Galasa; Erica and Galasa were forced to cook against each other in a sudden death cook off. They had thirty minutes to use chicken legs, cauliflower and garlic to create a top chef quality dish to stay in the competition. The chef who won the cookoff received $5000 (CAD) and reentered the competition.: WINNER OF SUDDEN DEATH COOKOFF: Erica (Chicken Shawarma, Cauliflower Couscous, Tahini, Mint Salsa Verde and Pomegranate); LOSER OF SUDDEN DEATH COOKOFF: Galasa (Grilled Chicken with Crispy Skin, Espellette-Roasted Cauliflower and Yogurt Dressing); Elimination Challenge: The chefs were tasked with creating a dish inspired by a local dish or restaurant. The dish must be elevated and pair with Mill Street beers. The dishes were served at a Mill Street brewery pub in the distillery historic district of downtown Toronto. The guest judge for the challenge was restaurateur Paul Toussaint.: WINNER: Kym (Sake Katsu Scallops with Smoked Apple & Tonka Bean Puree and Soy Cabbage); ELIMINATED Aicia (Pan-Fried Cod, Corn, Shishito Peppers and Charred Eggplant and Roasted Garlic Puree)
89	6	"Indigenous Ingredients"	May 24, 2021
Quickfire Challenge: The chefs were virtually paired with youth from across Canada and tasked to elevate their favorite dishes. The guest judge for the challenge was celebrity chef and Canadian food icon Anna Olson.: WINNER: Josh & Aariya (Chicken Biryani with Fresh Mango, Spun Cucumber and Basmati Rice.); Elimination Challenge: The chefs were tasked with creating dishes to honor the indigenous peoples of Canada using traditional indigenous ingredients. The chefs were randomly paired with either beans, pheasant, wild rice, elk, arctic char or Tuscarora corn to highlight in their dishes. The guest judge for this challenge was indigenous chef and restaurant owner Christa Bruneau-Guenther.: WINNER: Kym (Wild Rice Salad with Mushrooms, Sumac, Creme Fraiche and Milkweed Pods); ELIMINATED: Emily (Sumac & Kombu-Cured Fillet and Stewed Char Broth with Pine Mushrooms & Strawberries)
90	7	"Game, Set, Match"	May 31, 2021
Quickfire Challenge: The chefs were tasked to create dishes that pair perfectly with Stoneleigh branded Sauvignon Blanc wine. In a twist, head judge Mark McEwan would cook his own wine pairing dish. The time it took him to complete his dish would be the amount given to the chefs. After his cook the chefs received 14 minutes and 22 seconds for the challenge. The winner received a $3000 (CAD) cash prize from Stoneleigh wines and got an advantage in the elimination challenge.: WINNER: Josh (Pan-Seared Halibut with Berbere-Spiced Piri Piri Sauce and Crispy Kale); Elimination Challenge: The chefs were tasked with creating a dish inspired by a tennis-related prompt they picked randomly.: DOUBLES: Combine two previous dishes you made in the competition into one cohesive dish. (Alex); LOVE: Take a dish you liked from a competitor and reimagine it into a new dish. (Kym); FAULT: Take an unsuccessful dish you made previously in the competition and reimagine it. (Erica); BREAK: Cook a dish inspired by the your turning point in the competition. (Andrea); Note: As the winner of the quickfire challenge, Josh got to pick any prompt he wanted. He chose love. The chefs cooked and served their dishes at the Canada Tennis Center, home to the Canadian Open, where the judges would eat at half court. Guest judges for the challenge were tennis grand slam champion Daniel Nestor and Asian fusion chef and Canadian culinary icon Susur Lee.: WINNER: Josh (Seared Scallops with Coconut Curry, Raisin Puree and Fennel Salt); ELIMINATED: Alex (Octopus 'Bolognese' with Gochujang, Hand-Rolled Gnocchi, Shaved Parmesan and Basil Oil)
91	8	"A Winner Rises"	June 7, 2021
The Final Challenge: The final four chefs were tasked with creating a cohesive five course tasting menu that included an amuse bouche, appetizer, two main courses and a dessert. In a twist, after the appetizer course two chefs would be eliminated based on the performance of their first two dishes and would become sous chefs to the remaining two chefs. The sous chef who aided the winning chef would get a cash prize of $5000 (CAD) dollars. All the chefs got to shop for ingredients at Toronto's famous Kensington Market before serving their meals at the Four Seasons hotel in downtown Toronto. Andrea's Amuse Bouche and Appetizer: Jamaican Mussel Escovitch, Orange Emulsion, Sea Buckthorn Gel, Green Onion & Cilantro Oil; Scallop Kinilaw with Coconut, Bird's Eye Chili, Ginger, Green Onion & Cilantro Oil; Josh's Amuse Bouche and Appetizer: Red Snapper Tartare with Tostones; Lobster, King Crab and Asparagus with Plankton & Mussel Sauce; Kym's Amuse Bouche and Appetizer: Sesame Choux Puff with Mushroom XO Sauce and Scallion Mentaiko Kimchi; Scallop Crudo, Braised Pumpkin, Pickled Pumpkin, Pumpkin Ponzu, Aioli and Chive Oil; Erica's Amuse Bouche and Appetizer: Raw Smoked Salmon Tartare, Green Apple, Horseradish Crème Fraiche and Caviar; Matzo Meal Kreplach Stuffed with Chicken Liver & Foie Gras Mousse and Fresh Truffle; ELIMINATED: Josh & Andrea; Notes on the eliminations: While the judges enjoyed Josh's tartare and remarked on how fresh and vibrant it was, his appetizer "fell flat" and the flavor of the lobster and king crab were lost. As for Andrea, even though her appetizer was praised for its bold flavor, balance of acidity and technical excellence, her amuse bouche had a sauce that lacked acidity and overpowered the flavors of the seafood. The chefs who were eliminated were paired with Kym and Erica and tasked to assist them in assembling their final three dishes. Josh was paired with Erica and Andrea was paired with Kym. Kym's Main Courses and Dessert: Tofu Ravioli with Pho Consommé and Daikon; Quail Breast, Smoked Celeriac Puree and Chicken Skin Gremolata with Porcini Jus; Yuzu Panna Cotta with Sichuan Pepper Beignet, Ginger Gel and Candied Green Olives; Erica's Main Courses and Dessert: 'Moroccan Fish': Seared Sea Bass, Spicy Tomato Sauce, Spiced Pine Nuts and Lemon Foam; Squab Leg & Foie Gras Bastilla with Seared Squab Breast, Cauliflower Puree & Honey Coriander Jus; Yogurt Fig Cake with Rosewater Pastry Cream, Salted Yogurt, Pistachio Ice Cream & Crumble; The judges deliberate on who of the two chefs should be crowned Canada's top chef.: RUNNER UP: Kym; TOP CHEF: Erica Erica was named Canada's 9th Top Chef. The judges praised her for her continuous showing of powerful Middle Eastern flavors throughout the challenges and her consistency and technical skills in the final challenge. Erica marks the second woman to win the competition in nine seasons.
