= Raw meat =

Uncooked muscle tissue as food

Raw meat generally refers to any type of uncooked muscle tissue of an animal used for food. In the meat production industry, the term "meat" refers specifically to mammalian flesh, while the words "poultry" and "seafood" are used to differentiate between the tissue of birds and aquatic creatures.

While raw meat is sometimes washed before cooking, it is generally not encouraged as cross-contamination can spread bacteria from raw meat and poultry juices to other foods, utensils and surfaces.

== Consumption of raw meat ==
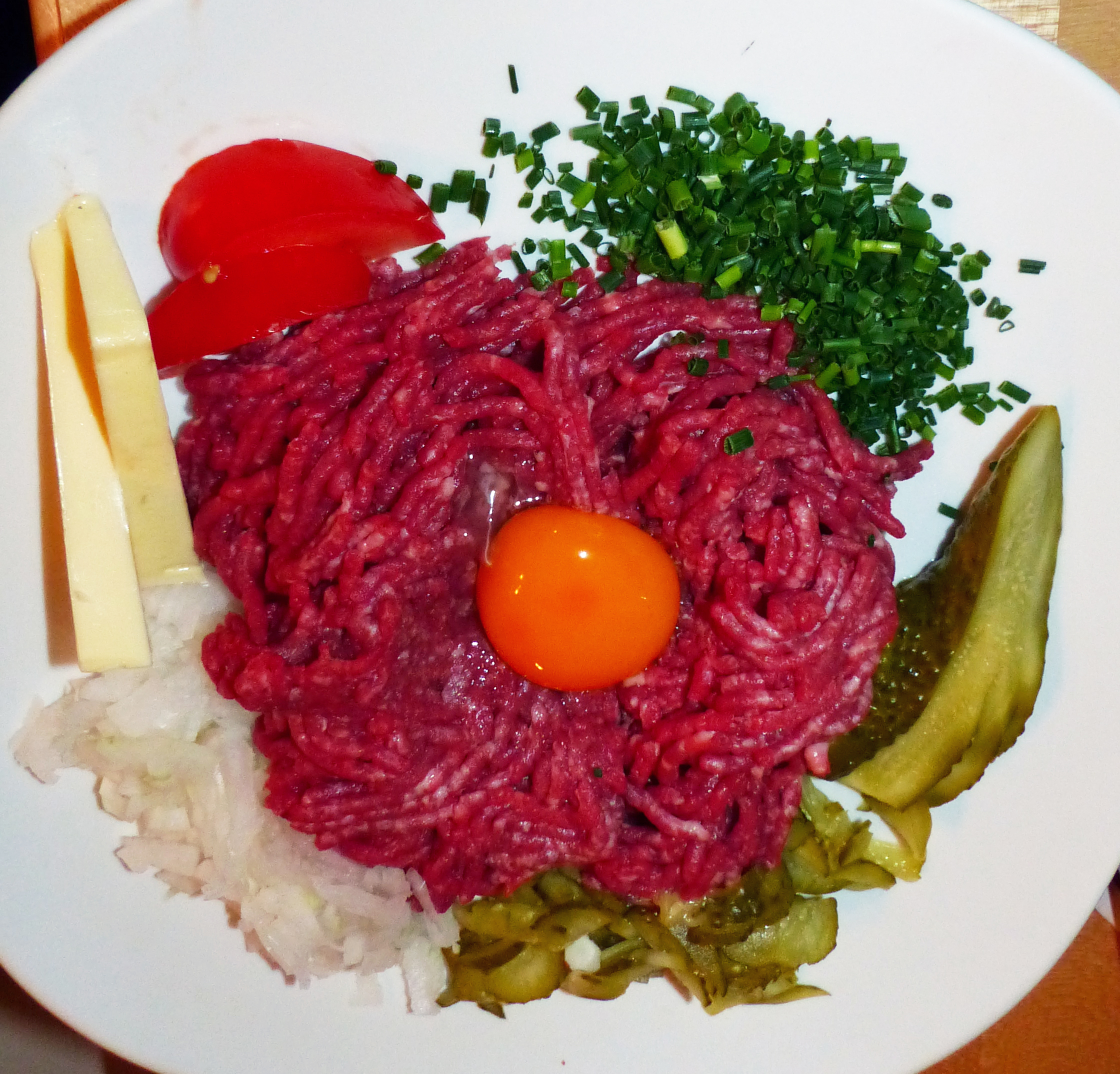
Steak tartare

While the majority of meat is cooked before eating, some traditional dishes such as crudos, steak tartare, Mett, kibbeh nayyeh, sushi/sashimi, raw oysters, Carpaccio or other delicacies can call for uncooked meat. The risk of disease from ingesting pathogens found in raw meat is significantly higher than cooked meat, although both can be contaminated. Meat can be incorrectly or insufficiently cooked, allowing disease-carrying pathogens to be ingested. Also, meat can be contaminated during the production process at any time, from the slicing of prepared meats to cross-contamination of food in a refrigerator. All of these situations lead to a greater risk of disease.

== Raw meat diseases ==
Every year in the United States, an estimated 76 million cases of foodborne diseases are diagnosed, resulting in 325,000 hospitalizations and 5,000 deaths. According to a multi-state study published in the America Journal of Preventative Medicine, the annual cost of disease caused by food-borne pathogens is estimated to be anywhere from 9.3 to 12.9 billion dollars in "medical costs and productivity losses." Most of these diseases come from contact with contaminated raw meat, although other "vehicles of transmission" are becoming more and more frequent due to global travel. Other sources of disease-causing pathogens can include, but are not limited to: lettuce, sprouts, fruit juices, vegetables, raw milk, and water. However, the main source of disease caused by microbial pathogens is usually raw meat. The type of pathogen present varies depending on the type of meat eaten.

== Beef, poultry and seafood ==
There are many disease-carrying pathogens found in raw meats, and they differ according to the source, whether it be mammalian, poultry, or seafood. Some disease-carrying pathogens found in beef are Salmonellas, Escherichia coli, Shigella, Staphylococcus aureus, and Listeria monocytogenes. Different varieties of Salmonellas are often found in contaminated poultry. Seafood itself can also contain a wide variety of pathogens. The most common pathogen in raw oysters is Vibrio gastroenteritis, while Salmonella, Plesiomonsas shielloides, and staphylococcus are found in contaminated raw shrimp, and Vibrio cholerae has been found in raw crabmeat. Many of the symptoms that result from these diseases involve intestinal damage and can have potentially fatal effects for those at risk. The symptoms of an E. coli infection include bloody diarrhea, severe abdominal pain, and possible complications for the immune-compromised, elderly or children. These complications can include Haemolytic uraemic syndrome (HUS) and neurological problems. The symptoms of Vibrio gastroenteritis include frequent fevers, bloody diarrhea, long duration of illness, and hospitalization. While most of these diseases are still most commonly found in raw meat, the instances of detection in other mediums are increasing. For instance, Salmonella is most commonly found in poultry, but has been recently identified in sources such as eggs, dairy, meat, and fresh vegetables and fruits. E. coli has also been found in beef, lamb, lettuce, sprouts, fruit juices, vegetables, raw milk, and water. Possible reasons for the increase are the globalization of the food market, improper handling, and leakage.

== Common bacteria ==
=== Beef ===
- "E. coli O157:H7"
- Salmonella serovars
- Shigella
- Staphylococcus aureus
- Listeria monocytogenes

=== Poultry ===
- Salmonellas
- Campylobacter

=== Shellfish ===
- Vibrio gastroenteritis
- Salmonellas
- Paragonimus
- Plesiomonas shigelloides
- Staphylococcus
- Bacillus cereus

== Parasites ==
- Anisakis
- Diphyllobothrium
- Sarcocystis
- Toxoplasma gondii
- Toxocara
- Taenia
- Trichinella

== Safety precautions ==
Food can be contaminated at any step of production or cooking, especially those that occur at home before consumption. According to a study published in the Journal of Food Safety on consumer attitudes and awareness of disease, most outbreaks of food borne illnesses result from "contaminated raw foods, cross-contamination, insufficient cooking, inadequate cooling or a lapse of more than 12 hours between preparing and eating." The study focused on habits of consumers in the kitchen with preparing raw meat. According to the results, 14% did not wash utensils or dishes between using them for raw and cooked foods, and 75% were unaware of the risks of storing raw meat on upper levels of refrigerators and the risk of cross-contamination below. The instances of salmonellosis and campylobacteriosis have increased in the past decade, according to the study, most frequently because of the "improper handling of foods by consumers and food service workers." Data gathered in a multi-state survey in 1999 found that out of 19,356 adults interviewed: 19% did not wash hands or cutting boards after handling raw meat, 20% ate pink hamburgers often, 50% ate undercooked eggs on a regular basis, 8% had raw oysters habitually, and 1% drank unpasteurized milk. These behaviors increase the risk of acquiring Salmonellas, Vibrio vulnificus, Vibrio gastroenteritis, and Escherichia coli.

=== Washing meat ===
Washing meat or cleaning meat is a technique of preparation, primarily used to treat raw meat or poultry prior to cooking in order to sanitize it. Several methods are used which are not limited to rinsing with running water (or with the use of a strainer) or soaking in saltwater, vinegar, lemon juice, or other acids, which may also enhance flavor when cooked.

Neither the U.S. Food and Drug Administration nor the United States Department of Agriculture recommend washing or cleaning meats, as cross-contamination can likely spread bacteria from raw meat and poultry juices to other foods, utensils and surfaces. While it might have been appropriate at one time in order to remove impurities due to self-slaughtered meats, according to the USDA, in modern times, no further washing is needed as meat and poultry are cleaned during processing.

== Meat inspection/regulation ==
=== History of U.S. federal meat inspection/regulation ===
The first instance of federal regulation of the meat industry occurred in 1890, when European markets began questioning the quality of American beef. The U.S. Department of Agriculture (USDA) was given the power to make sure European standards were met, and in 1891 could inspect slaughtered livestock to be sold in the United States. The momentum for the creation of meat regulation laws in the 20th century was spurred by the publication of The Jungle, by Upton Sinclair. Published in 1906, this exposé described the horrible and unsanitary conditions of the Chicago slaughterhouses and caused a public outcry for change. The Federal government authorized the Federal Meat Inspection Act (FMIA) in 1906 as a response. It "established sanitary standards for slaughter" and "mandated antemortem inspection of animals…and postmortem inspection of every carcass." Another stipulation was that government inspectors must be in every meat production facility. This law did not originally cover poultry, just beef and meat from other mammals, because poultry was not being mass-produced in the early 20th century. The federal meat inspection programs continued to be revised throughout the 20th century, especially in the 1960s and 1970s, in light of studies that showed more dangers not yet addressed. The current rule used by the FSIS, or Food Safety and Inspection Services, was published in 1996 and known as HACCP. This stands for the Pathogen Reduction/Hazard Analysis and Critical Control Point Systems. It was originally developed by the Pillsbury Company to ensure the safety of food used by the U.S. space program, and later adopted and modified by the federal government. The HACCP's goal is to: reduce the risk of foodborne illness associated with the consumption of meat and poultry products to the maximum extent possible by ensuring that appropriate and feasible measures are taken at each step in the food-production process where hazards can enter and where procedures and technologies exist or can be developed to prevent the hazard or reduce the likelihood it will occur. According to an article on the HACCP system published in Risk Analysis, the seven principles of implementing a HACCP system are:

1. "Conduct a hazard analysis.
2. Identify the CCP's (critical control points) in the process
3. Establish critical limits for preventative measures associated with each identified CCP.
4. Establish CCP monitoring requirements and procedures for using monitoring results to adjust processes and maintain control.
5. Establish corrective actions to be taken when monitoring indicates that there is a deviation from an established critical limit.
6. Establish effective recordkeeping procedures that document the HACCP plan.
7. Establish procedures to verify that the HACCP system is working correctly."

These measures try to ensure that the system is effective, reducing the risk of harmful pathogens sickening the public.

=== Current U.S. meat regulations/programs ===
There are many federal laws and programs in place to attempt to lower the rates of food borne infection. They cover a wide variety of issues, including regulation of meat production (with specific quality standards) and programs to help educate the public about food safety. One such program, The National Food Safety Initiative (FSI) was launched in 1997 and focused on "improving data on pathogens, coordinating regulatory responses, consumer educational efforts and behavioral surveillance." Industry efforts to lessen the spread of disease include milk pasteurization, "sanitary controls" on farms, and the development of the Hazard Analysis and Critical Control Point (HACCP). The Critical Control Point, or CCP, according to a study published in the Journal of Food Safety in 2004, is "a point, step, or procedure in a food process at which control can be applied, and as a result, a food safety hazard can be prevented, eliminated, or reduced to acceptable levels." Food "processors must use CCP critical limits that have been scientifically validated" to prevent the growth of pathogens. Specifically for meat, since pathogens grow in warmer temperatures, the CCP is related to the time and temperature meat is allowed to remain. As of 2004, the maximum "regulatory limit" for poultry during production was 13 degrees Celsius.

== Detection of pathogens ==
There are a variety of methods used to detect and kill pathogens. The most effective, as expected, is to cook the meat to a high enough temperature to kill all growth, but meat can be re-contaminated during any step of the food production process, especially if workers handle both raw and cooked products. The risk of disease from a ready-to-eat (RTE) product such as chicken nuggets is significantly higher due to the fact that many consumers do not re-cook them, believing them to be safe. E. coli, Salmonella and Shigella have all been found in RTE products. A study of working practices in shops selling raw meats (including butcher's shops, supermarkets and general stores) published in the Journal of Hygiene, found pathogens on slicing machines, wiping cloths, worker's hands, towels, and nail brushes. This facilitated the contamination of already cooked meats. This example shows the need of a method of detection. The traditional method is based on using cultures examined under a microscope, which is time-consuming. A method tested in 2005 in a study published in Meat Science, is called multiplex PCR (Polymerase Chain Reaction) and is based on the analyzing of nucleic acid and had promising results.

== Notes ==
=== References ===
- Ahn, D. U., Jo, C., Olson, D.G. "Analysis of volatile components and the sensory characteristics of irradiated raw pork." Meat Science 54.3 (2000): 209–215. Print.
- Altekruse, Sean F. DVM. "A multi-state survey of consumer food-handling and food-consumption practices." American Journal of Preventive Medicine 16.3 (1999): 216–221. Print.
- Altekruse, S. F. et al. "Vibrio Gastroenteritis in the US Gulf of Mexico Region: The Role of Raw Oysters." Epidemiology and Infection 124.3 (2000): 489–495. Cambridge University Press. Print.
- Bestor, Theodore C. "Supply-Side Sushi: Commodity, Market, and the Global City." American Anthropologist 103.1 (2001): 76–95. Blackwell Publishing on behalf of the American Anthropological Association. Print. Stable URL: https://www.jstor.org/stable/683923
- Duffy, Geraldine et al. "A review of quantitative microbial risk assessment in the management of Escherichia coli O157:H7 on beef." Meat Science 74.1 (2006): 76–88. Print.
- Hulebak, K.L.; Schlosser, W. "HACCP History and Conceptual Overview." Risk Analysis. 2002. Vol 22. pp. 547–552. Print.
- Ingham, Steven C., Losinski, Jill A., Becker, Katie L. "Growth of Escherichia coli O157:H7 and Salmonella Serovars on Raw Beef, Pork, Chicken, Bratwurst and Cured Corned Beef: Implications for HACCP Plan Critical Limits." Journal of Food Safety 24.4 (2004): 246–256. Print.
- Jalali, Mohammad et al. "Prevalence of Salmonella Spp. in Raw and Cooked Foods in Isfahan-Iran." Journal of Food Safety 28.3 (2008): 442–452. Print.
- Kegode, Redempta B. et al. "Occurrence Of Campylobacter species, Salmonella species and Generic Escherichia coli in Meat Products from Retail Outlets in the Fargo Metropolitan Area." Journal of Food Safety 28.1 (2008): 111–125. Print.
- Li Y., Zhuang S., Mustapha A. "Application of a multiplex PCR for the simultaneous detection of Escherichia coli O157:H7, Salmonella and Shigella in raw and ready-to-eat meat products." Meat Science 71.2 (2005): 402–406. Print.
- Myint, M.S. et al. "The effect of pre-enrichment protocol on the sensitivity and specificity of PCR for detection of naturally contaminated Salmonella in raw poultry compared to conventional culture." Food Microbiology 23.6 (2006): 599–604. Print.
- Sammarco, M.L., Ripabelli G., Grasso, G.M. "Consumer Attitude and Awareness towards Food-relate Hygienic Hazards." Journal of Food Safety 17.4 (1997): 215–221. Print.
- Scanga, J.A et al. "Microbiological contamination of raw beef trimmings and ground beef." Meat Science 56.2 (2000):145–152. Print.
- Smil, Vaclav. "Eating Meat: Evolution, Patterns, and Consequences. Population and Development Review 28.4 (2002): 599–639. Print.
- Tebbutt, G.M. "An Evaluation of Various Working Practices in Shops Selling Raw and Cooked Meats." The Journal of Hygiene 97.1 (1986): 81–90. Cambridge University Press. Print. Stable URL: https://www.jstor.org/stable/3863214
- Wallace, Barbara J. MD et al."Seafood-associated disease outbreaks in New York, 1980–1994." American Journal of Preventive Medicine 17.1 (1999): 48–54. Print.
