= Tiger meat =

Raw beef dish

Tiger meat, also called a cannibal sandwich or a wildcat, is a raw beef dish in Midwestern American cuisine. It consists of raw ground beef with onion and salt and pepper, often served with rye bread, or as a dip with crackers. Despite its name, it does not contain tiger flesh.

Tiger meat was first introduced in the United States by German immigrants. It is similar to the German food called Mett with minced raw pork or beef. States such as Minnesota, North Dakota, South Dakota, Kansas, and Texas often feature this dish. It is also served in Wisconsin at holiday parties and other festive events. People often eat tiger meat to preserve German traditions. It is also known as "cannibal sandwich", "wildcat", "parisa", “raw dog”, "yohactus" and "raw beef and onions". The origin of the name is not known. In southern Brazil, this kind of meat is called carne de onça ("jaguar meat").

== Public health concern ==
The Wisconsin Department of Health Services has urged against consuming tiger meat for risk of contracting E. coli and Salmonella. The United States Department of Agriculture suggests cooking the ground beef used in tiger meat to 160°F (71°C) to eliminate the possibility of foodborne illness.

== See also ==
- Basashi
- Çiğ köfte
- Crudos
- Kibbeh nayyeh
- Kitfo
- List of meat dishes
- Steak tartare
- Crudo alemán
- Mett
