= Yukhoe =

Korean raw meat dish

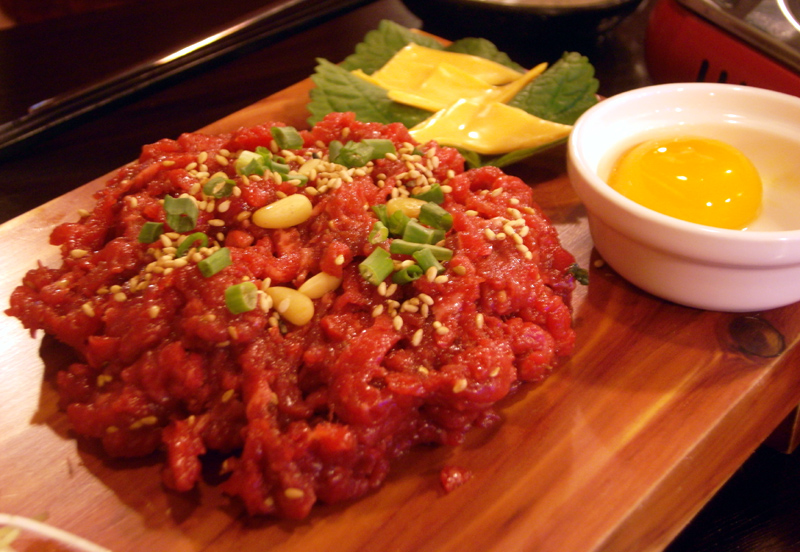
- Yukhoe served with separate egg yolk

Korean name
- Hangul: 육회
- Hanja: 肉膾
- RR: yukhoe
- MR: yukhoe
- IPA: [jukʰø]

Yukhoe (Korean: 육회; pronounced [jukʰø]) is a raw meat dish in Korean cuisine. It is most commonly made of beef but it can come in various kinds and cuts of meat.

Yukhoe literally means 'sliced and raw (meat or fish)' (hoe, 회; 膾) 'meat' (yuk, 육; 肉). Therefore, in the strictest context, the term designates any dish of raw meat cut up for consumption without the marinade but, colloquially, yukhoe means a dish of marinated raw beef slices. Though relatively rare to find these days, yukhoe can come in all kinds of meat. Yukhoe made of other meats will specify the source of the meat, for instance, a kkwong-yukhoe is made of pheasant, and a mal-yukhoe is made of horse meat.

Yukhoe is most commonly made of lean cuts such as an eye of round, but more tender cuts of a beef can also be used. The beef is cut into thin strips while the fat is removed. It is then seasoned with salt, sugar, sesame oil, pepper, and garlic. Korean pear, raw egg yolk, and pine nuts are commonly used as garnishes. It is similar to a Western tartare or a Levantine kibbeh nayeh.

Yukhoe is also made with other cuts of beef, such as liver, kidney, heart, cheonyeop, or yang, in which case the dish is called gaphoe (갑회; 甲膾). The ingredients are thoroughly cleaned and salted, then rinsed and dried to remove unpleasant odors. Gaphoe is usually seasoned with sesame oil, salt and pepper, and is served with a spicy mustard sauce.

== History ==
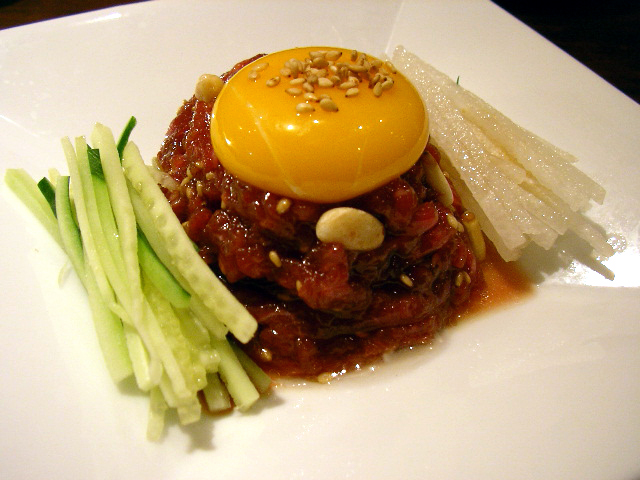
Yukhoe with julienned cucumbers and bae

According to the 19th century cookbook Siuijeonseo, thin slices of tender beef are soaked to remove blood before being finely shredded. The shredded beef is then marinated in a mixed sauce of chopped spring onion, minced garlic, pepper, oil, honey, pine nuts, sesame, and salt. Its dipping sauce, chogochujang (초고추장, chili pepper condiment mixed with vinegar and sugar) can be altered to taste, with pepper or honey.

During the Joseon Dynasty, cattle were essential to agriculture and their slaughter was strictly controlled by the government, making beef difficult to obtain. As a result, yukhoe was primarily enjoyed at royal court banquets rather than by the general public. Several origin theories exist for yukhoe bibimbap, including that it emerged as cattle breeding and consumption increased, as a quick meal for stonemasons in the Huangdeung area of Iksan, from meat obtained at slaughterhouses adjacent to cattle markets in Hampyeong, or as a meal eaten rapidly during the Imjin War (1592) in Jinju. The dish appears to have developed in locations where beef distribution was convenient.

A study of 59 yukhoe recipes from 19 Korean cookbooks published between 1766 and 2008 found that the dish was prepared using both lean meat (salkogi) and offal (naejang), with seasoning and garnishes varying by ingredient type. Lean meat recipes typically used soy sauce and pear, while offal recipes often omitted seasoning entirely and were served with mustard sauce. Some preparations, known as sukhoe, involved stir-frying or warming the beef rather than serving it completely raw.

Horse meat yukhoe is a regional specialty of Jeju Island, where horse meat consumption developed under the influence of Mongolian nomadic culture after Kublai Khan occupied Jeju in 1276, bringing 160 Mongolian horses to the island. A Korean proverb states: "Send a horse to Jeju, and send a man to Seoul," reflecting Jeju's reputation as an ideal place for raising horses.

Unlike in other East Asian cultures, where the Confucian worldview categorized raw meat consumption as a "barbarian" practice associated with nomadic peoples, yukhoe became an established dish in Korean cuisine, with possible influences from nomadic culinary traditions. A 1991 comparative study of Yuan China and Goryeo Korea found that while raw meat consumption was common in China until the Yuan dynasty, it declined thereafter; in Korea, however, the preference for raw meat persisted.

== Varieties ==
=== Beefs ===
- Cheonyeop-hoe (천엽회) – omasum
- Deunggol-hoe (등골회) – spinal cord
- Dugol-hoe (두골회) – brain
- Ganhoe (간회) – liver
- Gaphoe (갑회) – liver, kidney, omasum, abomasum
- Japhoe (잡회) – liver, tripe, kidney, and lean meat
- Kongpat-hoe (콩팥회) – kidney
- Satae-hoe (사태회) – shank
- Soesim-hoe (쇠심회) – tendon
- Yanggan-hoe (양간회) – tripe and liver
- Yanghoe (양회) – tripe
- Yukhoe (육회) – lean meat

=== Other meat ===
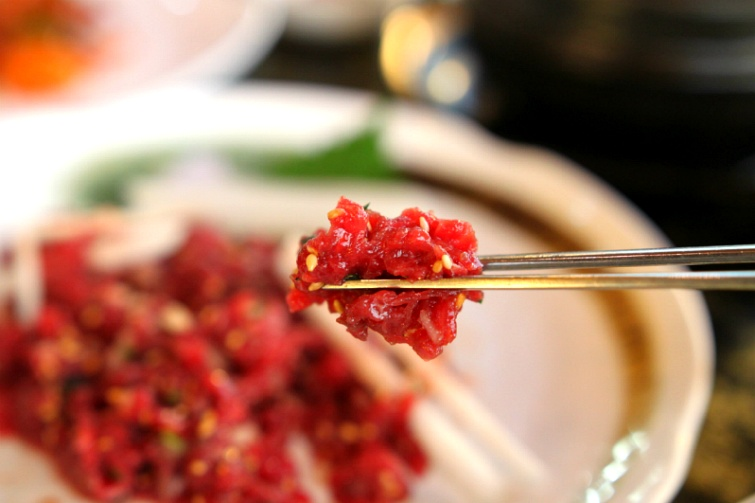
Mal-gogi-yukhoe (horse meat yukhoe)

- Dongchi-hoe (동치회) – pheasant meat
- Jangyuk-hoe (장육회) – roe deer venison
- Nogyuk-hoe (녹육회) – sika deer or wapiti deer venison
- Sanjeo-hoe (산저회) – wild boar pork
- Toyuk-hoe (토육회) – rabbit meat
- Yangyuk-hoe (양육회) – lamb

== Safety ==
Meat in Korean cuisine has highly detailed classifications regarding freshness, quality, and part differentiation for specific cooking methods. Since yukhoe uses raw beef, freshness is the most important criterion, and, for this typical dish's beef, it is recommended to use no more than one day after defrosting, and, traditionally, should not be aged more than one day after slaughtering. Regular Korean yukhoe customers are often patrons of trusted restaurants or butcher's shops which have well-known, high-quality beef distributors.

Since 2004, the Korean Government has run the Beef Traceability System. This system requires ID numbers with the age of the beef animal of origin, supplier, distributor, the beef's grade, and butchering date and originating butchery. Most of the good beef restaurants in Korea list their beef's information on the wall. Also, butcher shops post signs saying, "new beef coming day" (소 들어오는 날 so deureooneun nal): these words have become a well-known idiom in Korea and it means newly butchered beef supplied at the day.

Raw beef can be contaminated with pathogenic bacteria, with enterohemorrhagic E. coli (O111 or O157:H7) being of particular concern. Only by the freshness of beef can the risk be reduced. Cup yukhoe sold at baseball stadiums has raised food safety concerns, particularly during summer when over half of Salmonella poisoning cases occur, with experts advising vulnerable groups such as infants, pregnant women, and the elderly to avoid raw meat dishes.

=== Scientific research on safety ===
Recent research has explored the use of antimicrobial hydrogel patches containing natural extracts (such as grapefruit seed or citrus extract) which can reduce Listeria monocytogenes on raw beef surfaces by over 90% without cooking, offering a potential non-thermal safety intervention for dishes like Yukhoe. A calcium hydroxide–ethanol–lactate disinfectant can reduce harmful E. coli on raw beef by up to 100,000 times without cooking the meat.

=== Japan 2011 incident ===
The Japanese dish yukke derives from Korean yukhoe and was popularized in Japan by Zainichi Koreans, who built the country's post-war yakiniku industry.

In April and May 2011, five people died and more than 35 people were hospitalised after eating yukke made from beef not designated for raw consumption in various branches of a yakiniku restaurant chain Yakiniku Sakaya Ebisu in Toyama and Kanagawa prefectures, Japan, with enterohemorrhagic E. coli bacteria found in many of the cases.

On October 22, 2011, the last hospitalized victim, a 14-year-old boy, died of hemolytic-uremic syndrome. The final death toll of the incident was five people. As a result, the Japanese Ministry of Health, Labor and Welfare (MHLW) developed regulations for trimming raw beef to remove surface contamination. The MHLW also developed new regulations to require cooking the surface 1 cm deep to further reduce contamination. However, since the dimensions of individual pieces of yukhoe/yukke are quite smaller than 1 cm cubes, preparing the beef to this standard would cook it all the way through, and it would no longer be yukhoe/yukke.

== Gallery ==
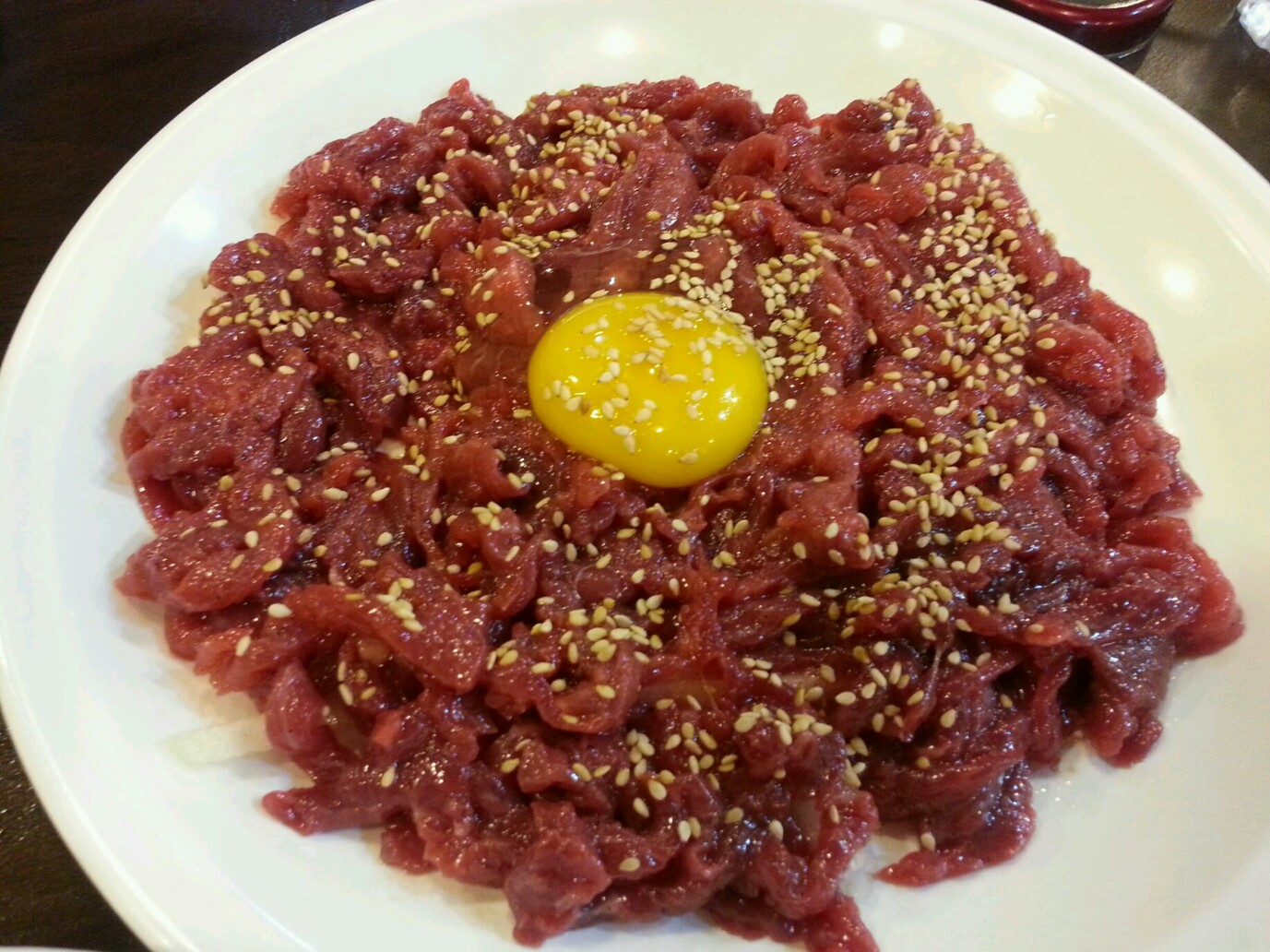

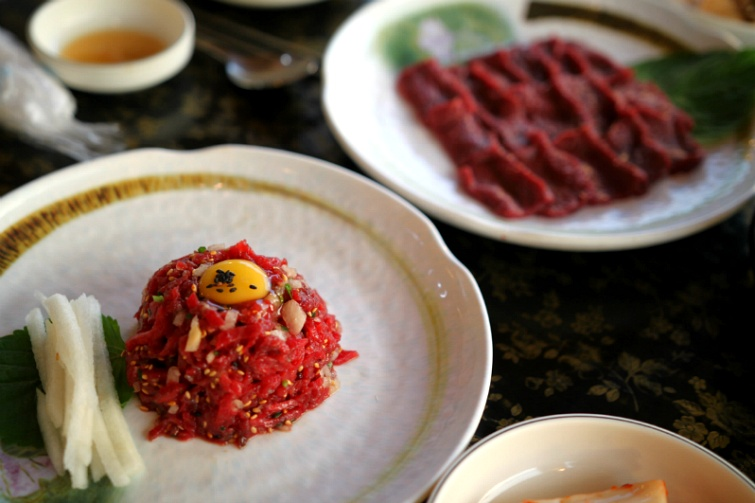
Malgogi-yukhoe (horse meat tartare)

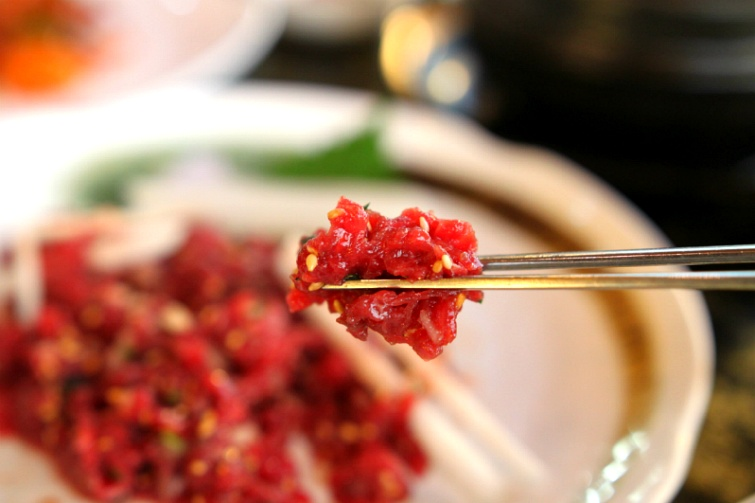
Malgogi-yukhoe (horse meat tartare)

Beef tartare served with chopped live octopus (San-nakji)

== See also ==
- Hoe
- Korean royal court cuisine
- List of beef dishes
- Siuijeonseo
- Steak tartare
- Kitfo
- Mett
