= Tartare =

Dish of finely chopped or minced ingredients

Tartare is a dish or culinary preparation consisting of finely chopped or minced ingredients, usually served cold and seasoned. The original form was steak tartare, made from beef; the technique is now used for other ingredients as well.

== Origins and development ==
Tartare comes from French gastronomy, particularly with steak tartare, which was popular in Parisian brasseries in the early 1900s. The name likely derived from the 19th-century fascination with "Tartar" culture rather than any direct Central Asian connection. Over time, the technique expanded beyond beef to other ingredients.

== Preparation ==
Tartare relies on high-quality, fresh ingredients suitable for raw consumption. The base ingredient is minced or diced finely by hand to preserve texture, then mixed with seasonings such as Worcestershire sauce, Dijon mustard, capers, shallots, and fresh herbs. It is often formed into a mound or ring and served with toast, bread, greens, or a raw egg yolk on top.

== Variations ==
The tartare technique is applied to various foods:

=== Meat ===
- Beef (steak tartare)
- Veal
- Horse meat (e.g., pesto di cavallo in the cuisine of Parma)

=== Fish and seafood ===
- Salmon, tuna tartare, sea bass, scallop, shrimp

=== Vegetables ===
- Eggplant, beet tartare, tomato.

=== Experimental ===
The use of seaweed tartare has been proposed as a way of providing nutritional supplementation.

== Related preparations ==
Tartare is often compared with other raw preparations such as ceviche and crudo.

== Related dishes ==
Examples include:

- Filet américain or américain préparé
- Martino sandwich
