= Mett =

Minced raw pork

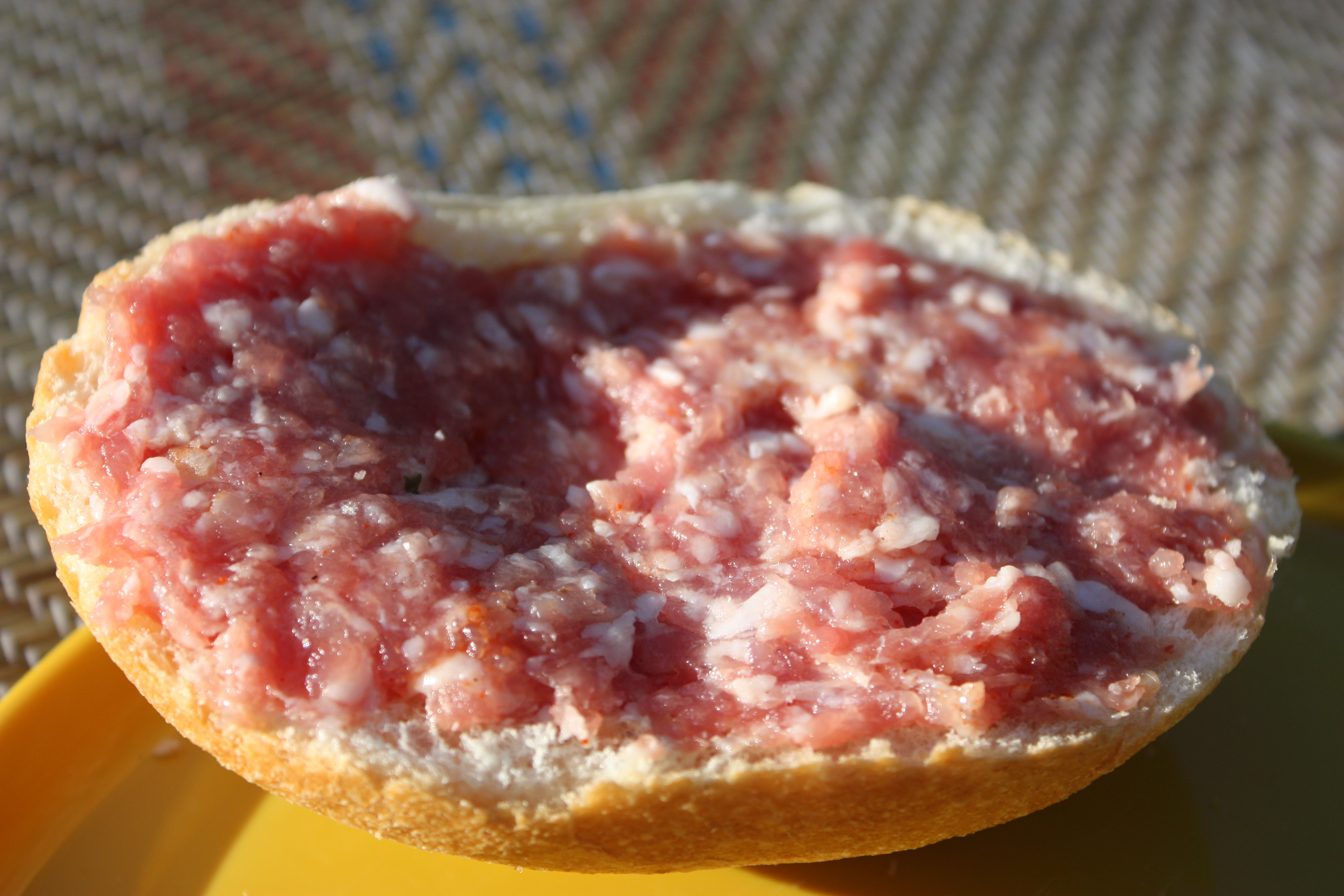
Mettbrötchen – mett on a bread roll

Mett (German: [mɛt]), also known as Hackepeter (Northern Germany, Eastern Germany and Berlin), is a preparation of minced raw pork seasoned with salt and black pepper that is popular in Germany. It is frequently spread on halves of a bread roll, with raw onion optionally on top. Since the 1950s mett has also been offered as a buffet dish decoratively formed into the shape of a hedgehog, with raw onion "spines". German law forbids mett being sold with a fat content exceeding 35%.

== Description ==
The name is derived from Low German mett for "chopped pork meat without fat", or Old Saxon meti for "food". It consists of minced pork meat, generally seasoned with salt and black pepper, regionally also with garlic or caraway, and eaten raw. It is also possible to add chopped onion, in which case it is known as Zwiebelmett (onion mett). Legally, German mett is not allowed to contain more than 35% fat. Unless pre-packaged, the German Lebensmittelhygiene-Verordnung ("food hygiene/health directive") permits mett to be sold only on the day of production. Mett is similar to tartare, a preparation of minced raw beef.

== Varieties ==
Schinkenmett ("ham mett"), prepared from the upper thigh (ham), is considered especially fine.

In contrast to the normally available locally minced mett, coarse pork mett (Grobes Schweinemett) is produced in an industrial meat grinder. To preserve its structure, the pork meat is normally processed in a semi-frozen state. Food and health regulations do not permit temperatures over 2 °C (36 °F); ice may not be used for cooling.

== Serving styles ==
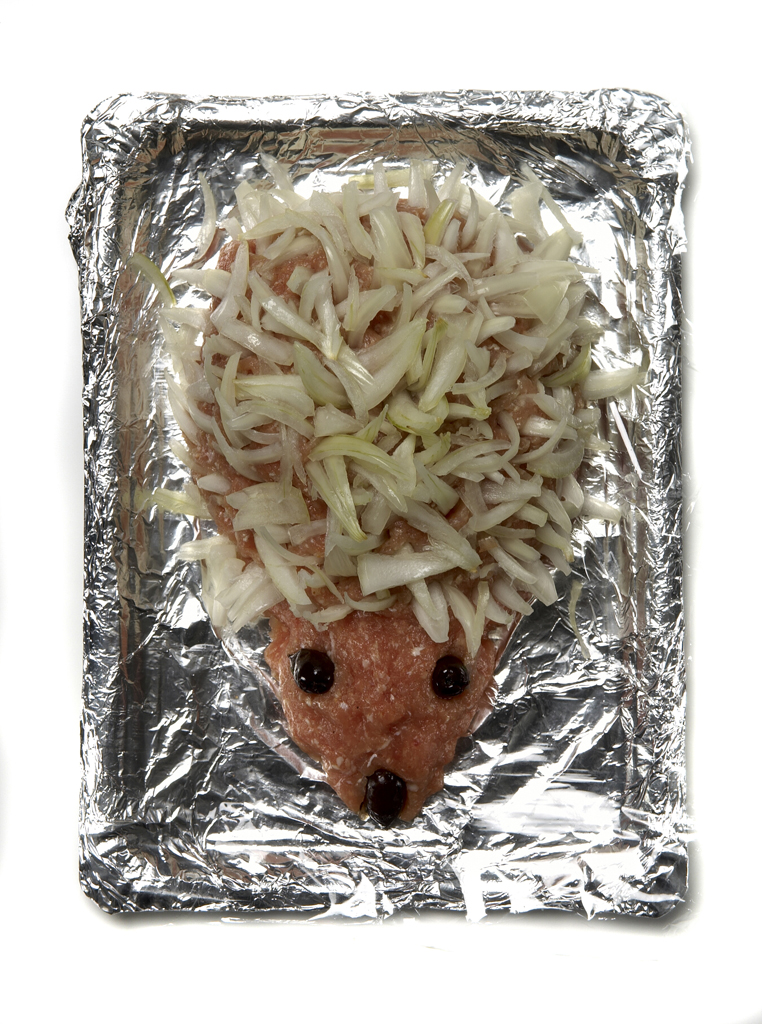
A Mettigel (mett in the shape of a hedgehog)

Mett is normally eaten on a bread roll (Mettbrötchen) or sliced bread, frequently with a garnish of raw onion rings or diced raw onion.

At buffets, mett is occasionally served as a Mettigel (Mett hedgehog, also Hackepeterigel or Hackepeterschwein). This form of serving mett has been popular since the 1950s. To serve it, a large amount of mett is shaped as a hedgehog, and quartered onion rings or pretzel sticks are used as spikes, with olives as eyes and nose.

Mett may also be offered in sausage form (German:Mettwurst).

In parts of Southern Germany mett (Mettstange) can be served on a lye bun instead of a regular bun.

In southern Brazil, influenced by German immigrants, it is known as Hackepeter or carne de Onça in Curitiba, where this dish is very common and served covered with chives. This variation is made of raw beef, not pork.

In Italy, salsiccia cruda is a spicy pork tartare dish.

In Wisconsin, the "cannibal sandwich" or "wildcat" (seasoned raw beef and sliced onions on rye bread) is sometimes consumed during holidays or family gatherings. Midwest historians typically agree that the continuing culinary practice is a result of 19th century German immigration to the area.

== See also ==
- Basashi
- Çiğ köfte
- Crudos
- Kibbeh nayyeh
- Kitfo
- List of pork dishes
- List of meat dishes
- Steak tartare
- Sushi
- Tiger meat
