= David Pasternack =

David Pasternack is an American chef. He operated the New York City restaurant, Esca. He is credited with introducing crudo, the Italian style of raw seafood, to the mainstream American culinary world when Esca opened in 2000. It closed in 2021.
