= Washing meat =

Food preparation technique

Washing meat or cleaning meat is a technique of preparation, primarily used to treat raw meat or poultry prior to cooking in order to sanitize it. Several methods are used which are not limited to rinsing with running water (or with the use of a strainer) or soaking in saltwater, vinegar, lemon juice, or other acids, which may also enhance flavor when cooked.

== Effectiveness ==
Neither the U.S. Food and Drug Administration nor the United States Department of Agriculture recommend washing or cleaning meats, as cross-contamination can likely spread bacteria from raw meat and poultry juices to other foods, utensils and surfaces. While it might have been appropriate at one time in order to remove impurities due to self-slaughtered meats, according to the USDA, in modern times, no further washing is needed as meat and poultry are cleaned during processing.

=== Modern usage persists ===
Although not recommended by the USDA, washing meat is a longstanding technique used in many household kitchens and by top chefs, many of whom recommend it in their cookbooks and on cooking television networks. Similarly, the same recommendation of avoiding cross-contamination is advised of brining and the usage of marinades.

After the CDC warned against washing chicken before cooking in statement posted on Twitter on 29 April 2019, there was backlash by some black Americans on Twitter, many of whom still implement this practice in their culinary uses today.

According to a study conducted by Jennifer Quinlan of Drexel University, roughly 90% of people in a survey of people in Philadelphia, USA, say they wash their chicken before cooking.

== In Different Cultures ==
The prevalence, process and purpose of washing meat may vary by culture, washing meat removes aromas that people of certain ethnicities are sometimes said to be more sensitive to.

=== Arab World ===
In Arab cuisine, it is common to wash certain meats using a marinade made of vinegar, salt and/or lemon juice to remove "gamey" aroma from meats, this aroma is sometimes referred to as Zanakha (Arabic: زنخة), although zanakha may also refer to the aroma of eggs, the word zafra (Arabic: زفرة) is sometimes be used in some regions.

Meat washing may also be substituted or accompanied by removing certain parts of the meat that are associated with bad aroma, such as the veins, blood, or scales.

In some areas like, Egypt and Iraq, washing meat using water is common.

=== Caribbean ===
Meat washing is practiced in some Caribbean cuisines, using water, vinegar or lemon juice to remove bad aroma.

=== Southeast Asia ===
Washing meat is also common in some southeast Asian countries, including Cambodia, Brunei, Indonesia, and Malaysia.

Different methods for washing are used and for different reasons, methods range from simply washing with water to soaking in a marinade of lime, salt or vinegar, the motives for washing vary, including: perceived lack of cleanliness of poultry purchased from markets, faith, culture, and removing bad aroma, washing is commonly done to remove dirt, blood, and slime.

== See also ==
- Brining
