= Salsiccia cruda =

Italian spiced pork cruda

Salsiccia cruda (lit. 'raw sausage') is a spiced raw (cruda) pork sausage produced in northern Italy. The taste of the tartare-type dish is described as soft and buttery. It is often served with toast and olive oil.

== See also ==
- Sausages in Italian cuisine
