= Filet américain =

Brussels meat dish of raw lean beef

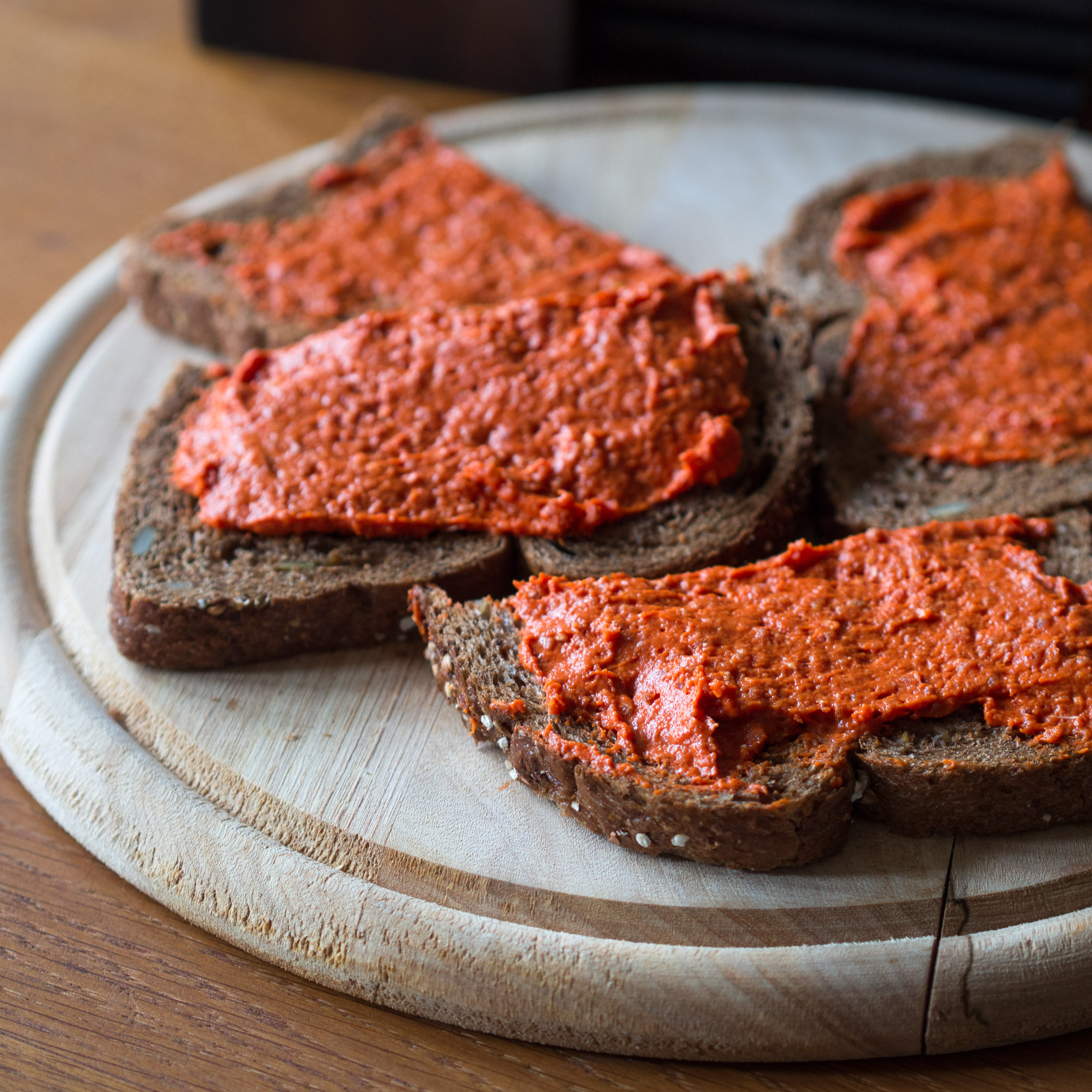
Filet americain on bread

Filet américain (often shortened to américain) a raw beef preparation associated particularly with Belgian cuisine and closely related to steak tartare. It consists of finely minced or ground beef, served either plain (nature) or seasoned with ingredients such as egg yolk, mustard, capers, onion and sauces.

In the Netherlands, the term filet americain commonly refers to a spreadable prepared version used as sandwich filling, whereas in Belgium the term may refer more broadly to both the natural and prepared forms.

== Terminology ==
Usage varies by region.

In Belgium, distinctions are often made between:

- Américain nature – finely minced raw beef served plain or seasoned at the table, closely related to steak tartare.
- Américain préparé – a prepared version in which seasonings are mixed into the meat before serving.

In everyday Belgian usage, filet américain, américain, and préparé may partially overlap.

In the Netherlands, filet americain usually refers to the prepared, spreadable form.

== Preparation ==
Traditional preparations may include:

- raw beef
- egg yolk
- mustard
- Worcestershire sauce
- capers
- shallots or onion
- parsley
- black pepper

Preparations vary by butcher, restaurant and region.

== Relation to steak tartare ==
Steak tartare and filet américain are closely related dishes and are sometimes considered variations of the same culinary family. Filet américain often denotes a finer-textured and more seasoned preparation.

=== Derived dishes ===
Derived dishes include:

- Martino sandwich
- Toast cannibale

== Cultural significance ==
Filet américain is associated particularly with Belgian brasserie and butcher traditions and is commonly served as a sandwich filling, starter or main dish, often with fries.

== See also ==
- Tartare
- Steak tartare
- Martino sandwich
