= Top Chef Canada season 10 =

Canadian television show season

Top Chef Canada
- Season 10
- No. of contestants: 11
- Winner: Trevane "Tre" Sanderson
- No. of episodes: 8

Release
- Original network: Food Network
- Original release: September 26 – November 14, 2022

Season chronology
- ← Previous; Season 9 Next → Season 11

The tenth season of the Canadian reality television series Top Chef Canada and was first broadcast on Food Network. The new season was first announced by Food Network Canada on August 17, 2022. The season was filmed in Toronto, Ontario and also included an international travel destination for the first time in the competition's history, when they travelled to the Cayman Islands for the finale and penultimate episode.

The season features special challenges and score system in celebration of the show's tenth season. Many challenges were based on previously used "classic" Top Chef Canada events including the traditional "Restaurant Wars" competition, as well as familiar Quickfire Challenge components. A new addition to the tenth season included the "X" point system, which saw chefs who underperformed in challenges receiving Xs against their name, and would compete in sudden death challenges to stay alive in the competition should they receive three demerit Xs throughout the competition. Once a chef is eliminated from the sudden death challenge, the twist ended.

Season 10 featured Eden Grinshpan again as host, and kept all of its mainstay judges, including Head Judge Mark McEwan, along with resident judges Chris Nuttall-Smith, Mijune Pak and Janet Zuccarini, who rotated through judging elimination challenges, with at least one resident judge present per episode, but at times featured two or all resident judges on some given episodes. David Zilber, culinary and fermentation expert was a new addition to the cast as a resident judge, but only judged for the first three episodes of the competition, due to familial obligations.

Top Chef Canada: Season 10 premiered on September 26, 2022, and concluded on November 14, 2022. In the season finale, Tre Sanderson was declared the winner over runner-up Deseree Lo. For winning the competition, Sanderson was awarded the grand prize of $100,000 (CAD) as well as other cash and tangible prizes.

== Contestants ==
Eleven chefs competed in season 10. Contestants are listed in the alphabetical order of their surnames.

- Martine Bauer, 36, Toronto, Ontario
- Tawnya Brant, 39, Ohsweken, Ontario
- Kimberly "Kim" Conway, 29, Charlottetown, Prince Edward Island
- Joachim "Jo" Hayward, 32, Toronto, Ontario
- Chris Irving, 40, Whitehorse, Yukon
- Camilo Lapointe-Nascimento, 25, Montreal, Quebec
- Deseree "Dez" Lo, 45, Vancouver, British Columbia
- Vishnav "Vish" Mayekar, 30, Vancouver, British Columbia
- Lindsay Porter, 36, Edmonton, Alberta
- Trevane "Tre" Sanderson, 27, Toronto, Ontario
- Monika Wahba, 32, Toronto, Ontario

== Contestant progress ==
No.	Contestant	1	2	3	4	5	6	7	8
No.	Quickfire; Winner(s)	Vish	Martine; Tawnya; Vish	Tre	Tre	Vish	Dez	Chris	Dez
1	Tre	WIN	IN	LOW	IN	HIGH	LOW	HIGH	WINNER
2	Deseree	IN	IN	WIN	LOW	HIGH	HIGH	WIN	RUNNER-UP
3	Camilo	IN	HIGH	HIGH	LOW	WIN	WIN	LOW	OUT
4	Chris	HIGH	WIN	HIGH	HIGH	HIGH	LOW	OUT	
5	Vish	HIGH	HIGH	LOW	HIGH	LOW	OUT		
6	Monika	IN	IN	HIGH	HIGH	OUT			
7	Tawnya	IN	LOW	HIGH	WIN	OUT			
8	Martine	IN	LOW	LOW	OUT				
9	Joachim	LOW	IN	OUT					
10	Kim	LOW	OUT						
11	Lindsay	OUT							

(WINNER) The chef won the season and was crowned Top Chef.
(RUNNER-UP) The chef was a runner-up for the season.
(WIN) The chef won that episode's Elimination Challenge.
(HIGH) The chef was selected as one of the top entries in the Elimination Challenge, but did not win.
(LOW) The chef was selected as one of the bottom entries in the Elimination Challenge, but was not eliminated.
(OUT) The chef lost that week's Elimination Challenge and was eliminated from the competition.
(IN) The chef neither won nor lost that week's Elimination Challenge. They also were not up to be eliminated.

== Episodes ==
No. overall	No. in season	Title	Original release date
92	1	"Welcome to Season X"	September 26, 2022
Eden welcomed the 11 new chefs in front of a live audience on Ossington Avenue in downtown Toronto. Chefs were informed that their underperformances in challenges would gives them strikes (or Xs) through the competition. If a chef receives 3 Xs, they would be forced to compete in a sudden death cookoff. After pleasantries, the chefs are thrown directly into their first Quickfire Challenge. Quickfire Challenge: Chefs competed in a multi-round culinary skills race. The first 6 to fillet a red snapper moved on, while losing chefs received Xs. In the second round, the 3 chefs with the most acceptably turned artichokes moved on. In the semi-finals, the two chefs with the best hollandaise sauce advanced to the finals, where the final two chefs had 15 minutes to use red snapper, artichokes and hollandaise sauce to create a dish. The chef with the best dish won immunity in the Elimination Challenge. The guest judge for this challenge, along with Janet Zuccarini, was Top Chef Canada alumnus Dale McKay.: WINNER: Vish (Red Snapper with Mediterranean Ragoût and Herb Hollandaise); Elimination Challenge: Before explaining the Elimination Challenge, Eden introduces the chefs to new resident judge David Zilbert. The chefs were tasked to take inspiration from a dish that changed their careers, and turn it into a Top Chef quality dish. The chefs were given 90 minute to cook, plate and serve their dishes at the Dish Play event space, and were joined by Top Chef Canada alumnus Andrea Nicholson as a guest judge.: WINNER: Tre (Smoked Jerk Shrimp with Plantain Crumb and Red Pepper Sauce); ELIMINATED: Lindsay ("Shrimp Etouffee"- Crispy Shrimp with Kabocha Squash Puree & Fennel Relish)
93	2	"Backstage Bites"	October 3, 2022
Quickfire Challenge: Chefs were divided into groups of three and tasked to create one cohesive dish with multiple twists from old Top Chef Canada Quickfire Challenges in 30 minutes. Each chefs would cook in 10 minute intervals, with the non-cooking chefs being blindfolded and unable to communicate verbally with their team mates. In the first ten minutes, the first chef had to select one unappealing ingredient from a vending machine to incorporate. In the second round, another chef had to pick two unmarked canned items to incorporate. The third chef had to finish the dish and plate. Since Tre won the previous Elimination Challenge, he was exempt from cooking. The three losing chefs would receive Xs, and Top Chef Canada alumnus Adrian Forte joined them as guest judge.: WINNERS: Vish, Martine and Tawnya (Potato Chip-Crusted Trout with Mackerel Relish in Mushroom Sauce); LOSERS: Chris, Deseree and Monika (Wasabi Pork with Eggplant Puree, Carrot, Tomato & Pea Relish and Sesame Salad); Elimination Challenge: Chefs were tasked to create appealing dishes for traveling musicians on the go. Each chef picked a catering station to run, (salad, sandwiches, sweets, raw bar or noodles) with two chefs present at each. The chefs prepared their offerings at the El Mocambo tavern, while The Beaches rehearsed musical sets and tasted each dish. Then they would serve the judging panel, along with guest judge and Top Chef Canada alumnus Danny Smiles.: WINNER: Chris (Grilled Chicken Thigh Sandwich with Pickled Ramps, Cranberry & Horseradish Aïoli); ELIMINATED: Kim (Oyester Po'Boy with Fennel & Apple Slaw, Blueberry Jam and Crispy Prosciutto)
94	3	"Restaurant Wars"	October 10, 2022
Quickfire Challenge: The chefs competed in a blind taste test challenge, where each chef was divided into groups of three and were presented a dish made by judge David Zilber. The chefs could taste each dish for 15 seconds, then rotated through naming an ingredient they thought was part of the dish. The first to guess incorrectly was eliminated, and the two winning chefs moved on. In the second round, only the last chef standing moved on. In the last round, the remaining two chefs had 30 seconds to taste. The winner of the final round received an advantage in the Elimination Challenge.: WINNER: Tre; Elimination Challenge: The chefs competed in the classic Top Chef challenge "Restaurant Wars." Tre was chosen captain as his advantage, and got to pick the first member of his team. He also got to choose his opposing captain and picked Chris. The teams were tasked to create a full restaurant concept with each chef preparing at least one dish, as well as appointing one front of house member who would serve a dining room full of guest and the judges at the Beach Club in Toronto. In a twist, chefs would also receive Doordash mobile orders they would need to fulfill, as well as that the chef with the overall best dish from the winning team would win $5,000 (CAD). It is also announced Top Chef veteran Gail Simmons would be dining as a guest judge. Team Dil Se: TEAM CAPTAIN: Tre; FRONT OF HOUSE: Vish; Tre, Vish, Jo, Camilo Team Jardin: TEAM CAPTAIN: Chris; FRONT OF HOUSE: Tawnya; Chris, Tawyna, Martine, Monika, Deseree Dil Se's Menu: Bison Carne Cru with Horseradish Capers & Cornichons, Quail Egg (Vish, Appetizer); Seared Scallops with Porcini Mushrooms, Jerk Caramel and Herb Oil (Tre, Mid Course); Duck Two Ways- Duck Breast and Confit Legs with Plums, Grilled Endive and Morels (Jo, Main Course); Fruits Rouge Financier with Pistachio White Chocolate Ganache and Berry Coulis (Martine, Dessert); Jardin's Menu: King Crab Taco with a Miso Emulsion, Ranch Dressing and Puffed Wild Rice (Camilo, Appetizer); Marinated Beets & Burrata with Pistachio Dukkah and Grilled Za'atar Flatbread (Monika, Appetizer); Fire-Roasted Halibut with Potato Pave and Sauteed Chanterelles (Chris, Main Course); Harissa Grilled Steak with Chimichurri and Seasonal Vegetables (Deseree, Main Course); Strawberry Rhubarb Shortcake with Chantilly and a Strawberry Gastrique (Tawnya, Dessert); Peach Melba with Sable Breton, Poached Peaches and Pate a Bombe (Camilo, Dessert); WINNING TEAM: Jardin: Chris, Tawyna, Martine, Monika, Deseree; LOSING TEAM: Dil Se: Tre, Vish, Jo, Camilo; ELIMINATED: Jo (Duck Breast and Confit Legs with Plums, Grilled Endive and Morels)
95	4	"Soccer Fever"	October 17, 2022
Quickfire Challenge: The chefs were tasked to pick two colors to prominently feature in a Top Chef quality dish, one they selected personally, as well as one randomly. Halfway through the challenge, the chefs were told they must all incorporate the color beetroot into all of their dishes. Joining the chefs as a guest judge was chef George Mendes, and it's announced the chef with the best dish would receive a $5000 (CAD) cash prize courtesy of Kitchenaid.: NOTE: With her bottom placing dish in this challenge, Monika received her third X and would be forced to cook for her life once another chef received their third X.; WINNER: Tre (Blueberry Buttermilk Scallop Ceviche, Scorched Orange and Beetroot Powder); Elimination Challenge: Chefs were asked to create barbeque dishes featuring proteins they picked randomly, to serve to the next generation of soccer players in Canada. The chefs prepped in the Top Chef kitchen, then finished and served their dishes at Toronto's BMO Stadium, where they fed both junior and professional players. In a twist, chefs would also have to include either preserved lemons, red pepper relish or endives; traditional ingredients from countries Canada would face in the first round of the 2022 FIFA World Cup. The judges ate on the field, and were joined by Marcus Samuelsson as a guest judge.: WINNER: Tawnya (Birch BBQ Lamb Chops, Potato Salad and Grilled Corn Rib); ELIMINATED: Martine (Miami Short Rib with Bean Salad, Roasted Pepper & Charred Pineapple Emulsion, Gribiche Sauce)
96	5	"Vegan Feast"	October 24, 2022
Quickfire Challenge: The chefs were tasked to create as many complete restaurant quality dishes in 35 minutes while also maintaining a clean work station. Alvin Leung served as a guest judge, and determined if a dish was good enough to be accepted. He also took points off from good dishes if the chef's station was considered messy. The chef with the most accepted dishes won a $5000 (CAD) cash prize from Tiger Towels.: WINNER: Vish (Burrata and Tomato Salad with Foraged Mushrooms + Shrimp Crudo with Kumquat Orange and Calabrian Chili Oil + Poached White Asparagus with Salmon Roe Crema); Sudden Death Cookoff: With the Quickfire Challenge, Tawnya's low placing dishes gave her a third X, which meant she would face off against Monika in a sudden death challenge. The chefs were given 20 minutes to create a dish featuring Avocados. Mijune Pak helped judge the challenge, and the winner chef would continue in the competition and win a $3000 (CAD) cash prize from Avocados from Mexico.: WINNER: Monika (Avocado Hummus with Battered Shrimp); ELIMINATED: Tawnya (Salmon Taco with Guacamole, Fresh Avocado and Salsa); Elimination Challenge: The chefs were tasked to create a harmonious Vegan feast featuring one seasonal vegetable they selected randomly. They had 90 minutes to prep in the Top Chef Canada kitchen before finishing and serving judges at Harriet's Restaurant in the 1 Hotel in Toronto's downtown core. Vegan chef Amanda Cohen and ET Canada host Cheryl Hickey served as guest judges. The chefs are also informed that X twist for the season has stopped, since Tawnya was eliminated.: WINNER: Camilo (Cucumber Gratiné, White Chocolate Ganache, White Chocolate Crumble and Grilled Cucumber); BOTTOM: Vish (Cauliflower with Caramelized Cipollini Sauce, Green Onion Vinaigrette and Hazelnut Onion Cream) + Monika (Cabbage Rolls Stuffed with Rice, Pine Nuts & Raisins and Tomato Sauce); At Judges' Table, the episode ends in a cliffhanger as the judges struggle to pick between Vish and Monika's dishes to eliminate.
97	6	"Date Night"	October 31, 2022
The judges eliminated Monika from the competition after deliberation.: ELIMINATED: Monika (Cabbage Rolls Stuffed with Rice, Pine Nuts & Raisins and Tomato Sauce); Quickfire Challenge: The chefs were tasked to create dishes pairing two distinct tastes (sweet, salty, sour, bitter, umami) that they picked randomly. The chefs were joined by Ricardo Larrivée as a guest judge, and the chef with the best overall dish would win $5000 (CAN) dollars from Montpellier sparkling water.: WINNER: Deseree (Bitter and Salty- Broccolini and Radicchio with Fermented Black Bean Vinaigrette); Elimination Challenge: The chefs were tasked to create dishes inspired the judging panel's favorite date night classics. Each judge and their partner gave them a dish to be inspired by, and each chef picked one randomly to create. The chefs prepped and served their dishes to the judging and their partner's at Byblo's Uptown Restaurant in Toronto. The chef with the best dish received A $5000 (CAD) cash prize from Campo Vieja wine. The chefs were also told that the final four chefs would travel to the Cayman Islands for the remainder of the competition.: WINNER: Camilo (Filet de Boeuf with Pomme de Terre Dauphine and Sauce Bordelaise); ELIMINATED: Vish (Sablefish with Lobster-Stuffed Morels, White Asparagus and Beurre Blanc)
98	7	"Welcome to the Cayman Islands"	November 7, 2022
99	8	"Canada's Top Chef Is..."	November 14, 2022
