= Top Chef Canada season 11 =

Canadian television show season

Top Chef Canada
- Season 11
- No. of contestants: 10
- Winner: Chanthy Yen
- No. of episodes: 8

Release
- Original network: Food Network
- Original release: October 14, 2024

Season chronology
- ← Previous; Season 10

The eleventh season of the Canadian reality television series Top Chef Canada debuted on Food Network, on October 14, 2024. Season 11 featured Eden Grinshpan returning as host, with judges Mark McEwan, Mijune Pak, David Zilber and Janet Zuccarini.

In the season finale in Montreal, Vancouver chef Chanthy Yen was named the winner over Moira Murray from Halifax. Yen is the first queer and the first Southeast Asian champion in eleven seasons of competition. Yen's career has included a stint as private chef for Prime Minister Justin Trudeau and his family. Yen's grand prize included $100,000 cash, and a suite of goods, services and cash from various program sponsors.

== Contestants ==
Ten chefs competed in season 11. Contestants are listed in the alphabetical order of their surnames:

- Lisa Ahier, 63, Tofino, British Columbia
- Shane Chartrand, 48, Edmonton, Alberta
- Miriam Echeverria, 42, Algonquin Highlands, Ontario
- Alexander Fields, 32, Etobicoke, Ontario
- Ruby Gatt, 32, Montreal, Quebec
- Christina Khan, 31, Toronto, Ontario
- Rémi Lemieux, 30, Montreal, Quebec
- Moira Murray, 35, Halifax, Nova Scotia
- Haan Palcu-Chang, 39, Salt Spring Island, British Columbia
- Chanthy Yen, 35, Vancouver, British Columbia

== Contestant progress ==
No.	Contestant	1	2	3	4	5	6	7	8
No.	Quickfire; Winner(s)	—	Haan	Chanthy	Chanthy	Chanthy	Haan	Haan	Moira
1	Chanthy	IN	IN	HIGH	WIN	LOW	HIGH	WIN	WINNER
2	Moira	HIGH	HIGH	IN	WIN	LOW	WIN	HIGH	RUNNER- UP
3	Haan	WIN	WIN	WIN	IN	HIGH	HIGH	LOW	OUT
4	Lisa	HIGH	IN	LOW	IN	HIGH	LOW	OUT	
5	Shane	IN	IN	IN	LOW	WIN	OUT		
6	Christina	IN	LOW	HIGH	IN	OUT			
7	Miriam	LOW	LOW	LOW	OUT				
8	Rémi	HIGH	HIGH	OUT					
9	Alex	HIGH	OUT						
10	Ruby	OUT							

== Episodes ==
No. overall	No. in season	Title	Original release date
100	1	"Chaos Menu"	October 14, 2024
101	2	"Firsts"	October 21, 2024
102	3	"The Feast of Toronto"	October 28, 2024
103	4	"The Gala Fundraiser"	November 4, 2024
104	5	"Taste of the Terroir"	November 11, 2024
105	6	"Flavours of the Future"	November 18, 2024
106	7	"Lights Camera Cooking"	November 25, 2024
107	8	"The Curtain Call"	December 2, 2024
