= Crudo =

Italian cooking term meaning 'raw'

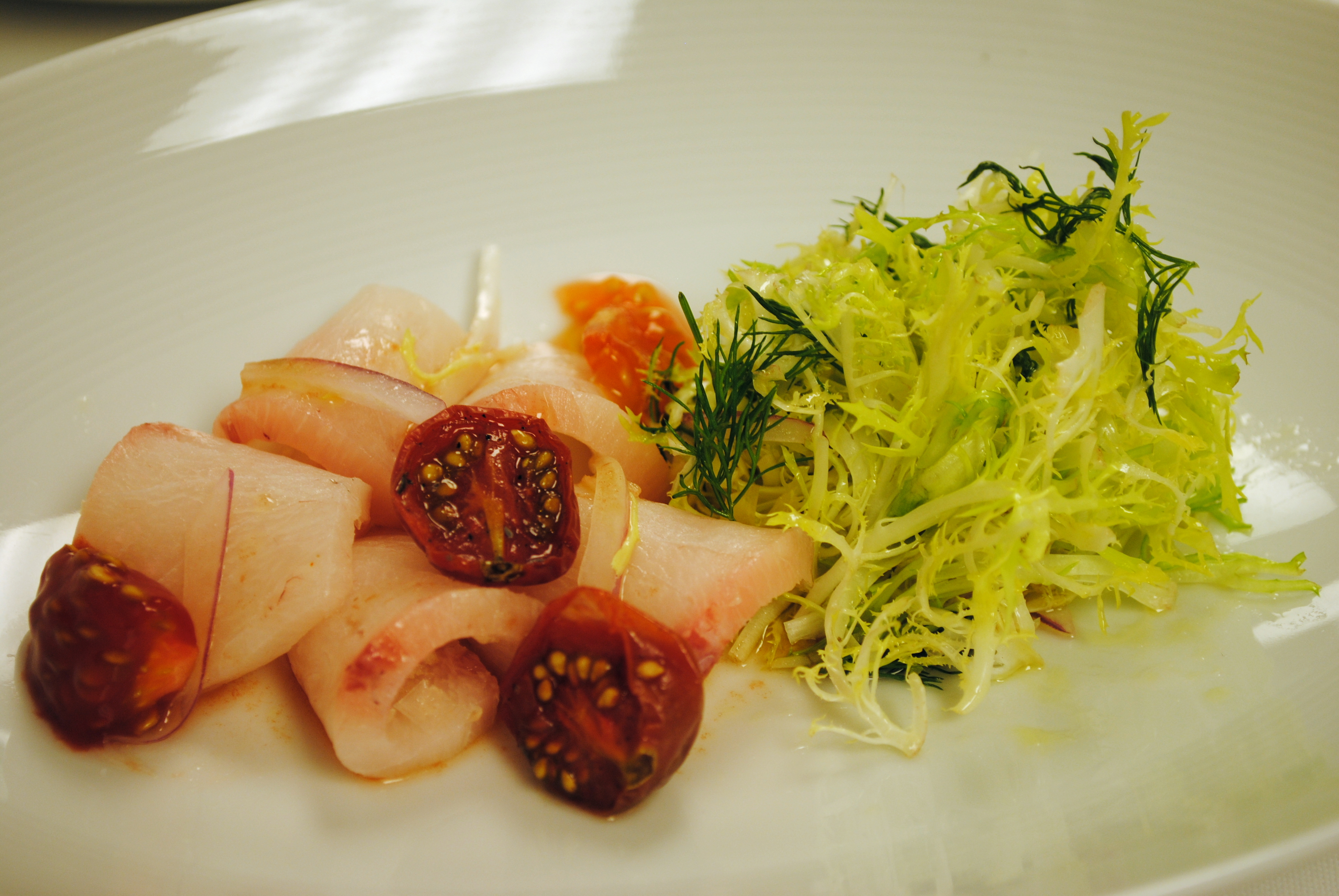
Hamachi crudo from Balsan restaurant at the Waldorf Astoria Chicago

In Italian, crudo (Italian: [ˈkruːdo]) means 'raw'. In Italian cuisine, this word can be used to describe many kinds of food: for example, pesce crudo means 'raw fish', and carne cruda means 'raw meat', similar to steak tartare.

A typical dish of crudo consists of raw fish dressed with olive oil, salt, acidic juices (such as lemon or lime), and vinegar.

New York chef and author David Pasternack describes crudo as "Italian sashimi".

When Italians use "crudo" alone referring to a food, they generally mean "prosciutto crudo", i.e. dry-cured ham in the Italian style, to distinguish from "[prosciutto] cotto", which may refer to any kind of cooked ham.

== See also ==
- Carpaccio
- Salsiccia cruda
