= Steak tartare =

Dish of finely chopped raw beef

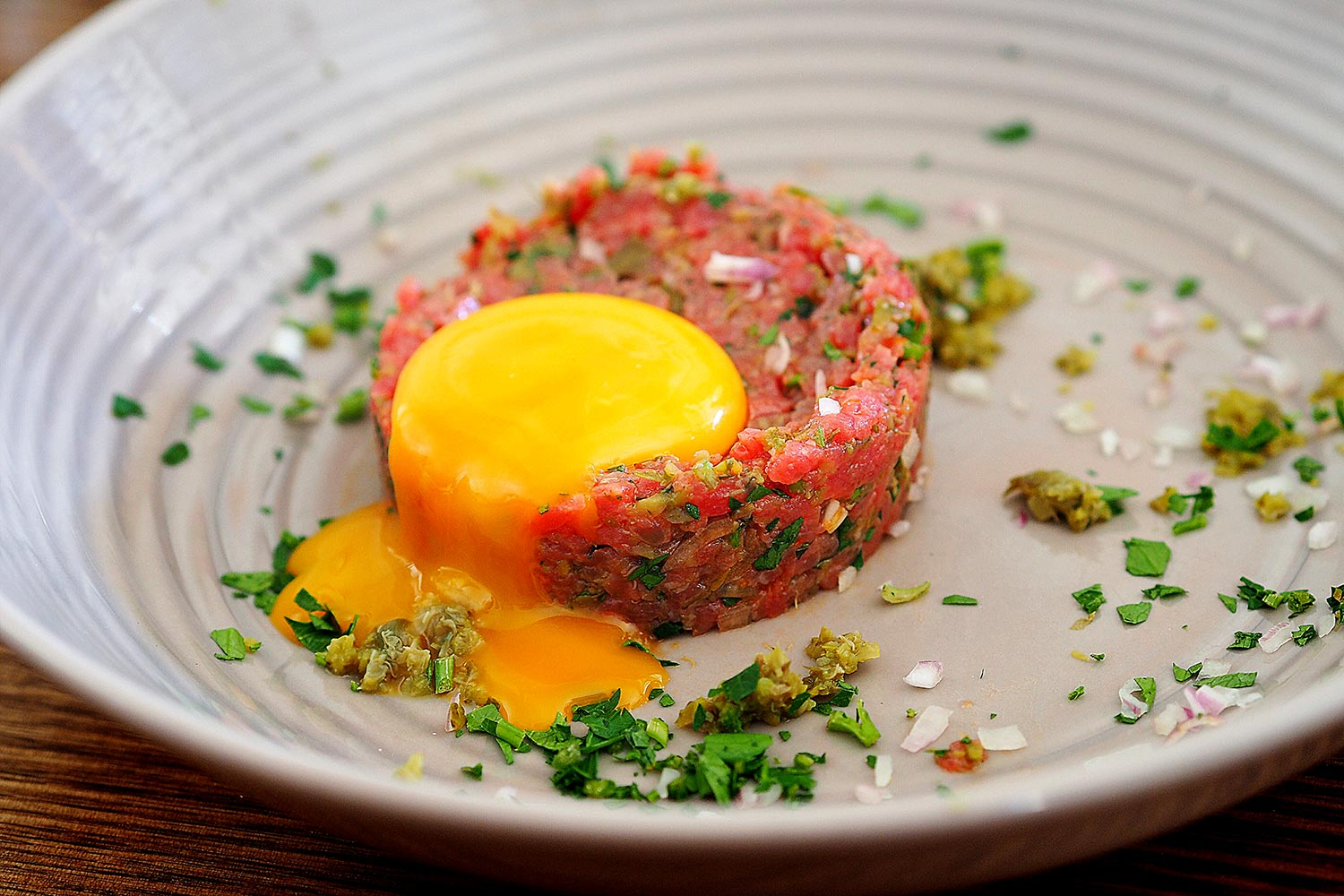
- Beef steak tartare with raw egg yolk
- Course: Main course
- Main ingredients: Raw beef
- Variations: Tartare aller-retour

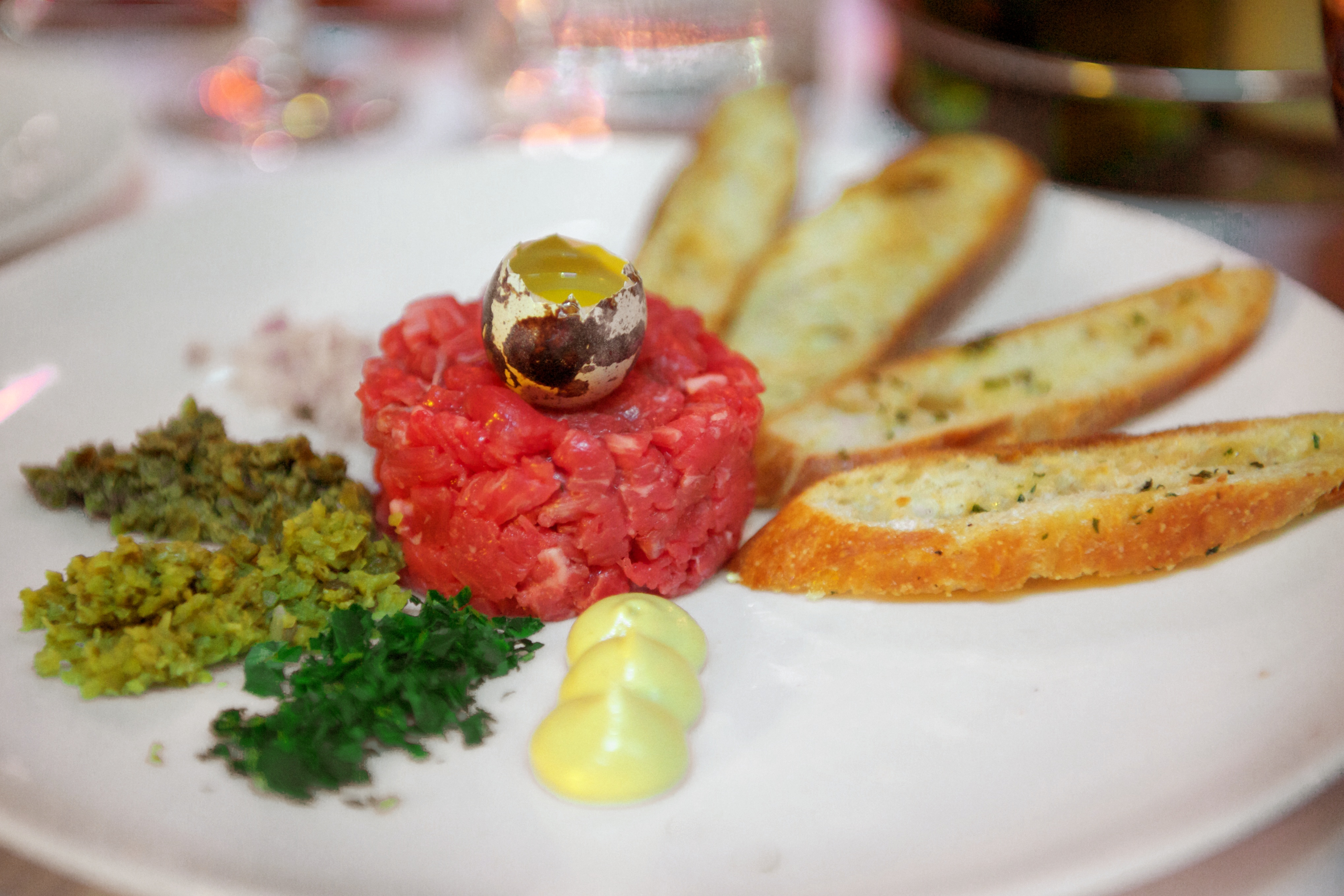
Steak tartare in the French Quarter of San Francisco

Steak tartare, (Note: Pronounced / ... tɑːrˈtɑːr/ tar-TAR, UK also / ... təˈ/ tə-; French: [stɛk taʁtaʁ]) or tartar steak, is a French dish of raw ground (minced) beef. It is usually served with onions, capers, parsley or chive, salt, pepper, Worcestershire sauce and other seasonings, often presented separately, to be added to taste. It is commonly served topped with a raw egg yolk. It is similar to Piedmontese battuta al coltello, as well as Levantine kibbeh nayyeh, Ethiopian kitfo, Turkish çiğ köfte, German Mett and Korean yukhoe.

The name tartare is sometimes generalized to other raw meat or fish dishes. In France, a less-common variant called tartare aller-retour is a mound of mostly raw ground meat lightly seared on both sides.

== History ==
=== Tatars and raw meat ===
A popular caricature of Turco-Mongol warriors—called Tatars or Tartars—has them tenderizing meat under their saddles, then eating it raw. This story was popularized by the French chronicler Jean de Joinville in the 13th century, although he never actually encountered Tatars himself and used the story as a way of showing that the Tartars were uncivilized. It is possible that this story was a confusion: The Cambridge Medieval History says the story was started by early chroniclers who saw Mongol horsemen putting thin slices of raw meat beneath their saddles, but that the meat was meant to help heal the horses' saddle sores rather than fill the men's stomachs. The book notes that the meat would have been drenched with sweat and inedible by the end of the day. The same story has been told about pastirma.

=== Popularization of raw meat in Europe and the United States ===
In the late 19th century, the Hamburg steak became popular on the menus of many restaurants in the port of New York. This kind of fillet was beef minced by hand, lightly salted, and often smoked, and usually served raw in a dish along with onions and bread crumbs. Hamburg steak gained popularity because of its ease of preparation and decreasing cost. This is evident from its detailed description in some of the most popular cookbooks of the day. This preparation style was used by 1887 in some U.S. restaurants and was also used for feeding patients in hospitals; the Hamburg steak was served raw or lightly cooked and was accompanied by a raw egg.

It is not known when the first restaurant recipe for steak tartare appeared. While not providing a clear name, it is possible that the dish was popularized in Paris by restaurateurs who misunderstood Jules Verne's description of "koulbat" ("...a patty of crushed meat and eggs...") in his 1875 novel Michael Strogoff.

=== Origins of the name ===
In the early 20th century, what is now generally known as "steak tartare" was called steak à l'Americaine in Europe. One variation on that dish included serving it with tartar sauce; the 1922 edition of Escoffier's Le Guide Culinaire defines "Steak à la tartare" as "steak à l'Americaine" made without egg yolk, served with tartar sauce on the side. "Steak à la tartare" (literally meaning "served with tartar sauce") was later shortened to "steak tartare". Over time, the distinction between steak à l'Americaine and its tartar-sauce variant disappeared. The 1938 edition of Larousse Gastronomique describes steak tartare as raw ground beef served with a raw egg yolk, without any mention of tartar sauce.

"À la tartare" or simply "tartare" can still mean "served with tartar sauce" for some dishes, mostly fried fish. At the same time, the name "tartare" is also sometimes applied to other dishes of raw meats or fish, such as tuna tartare, introduced in 1975 by the restaurant Le Duc in Paris.

== Health concerns ==
Health concerns have reduced the popularity of this meat dish in some parts of the world because of the danger of contamination by bacteria and parasites such as Toxoplasma gondii and Taenia saginata.

=== Bacteria ===
According to the World Health Organization, when basic hygienic rules are followed and fresh meat is used, the risk of bacterial infection is low. However, in the United States, ground beef is not typically sold in the expectation that it will be eaten uncooked. The process of grinding beef can introduce any surface pathogens into the interior of the meat, where they pose greater danger. The United States Department of Agriculture (USDA) recommends avoiding uncooked ground beef.

=== Parasites ===
Toxoplasma gondii is a parasite that may be found in raw or undercooked meat. A multicentre case-control study found inadequately cooked or inadequately cured meat as the main risk factor for toxoplasma infection in all centres. Due to the risk of congenital toxoplasmosis in the fetus, pregnant women are advised not to eat raw meat.

Taenia saginata (beef tapeworm) may also be acquired via ingestion of undercooked beef. The tapeworm is transmitted to humans via infectious larval cysts found in cattle. People with taeniasis may not know they have a tapeworm infection because the symptoms are usually mild or nonexistent.

== Regional variations ==
=== North America ===
Steak tartare is served at many high-end restaurants in the United States.

In Wisconsin, a variation of a steak tartare sandwich called a "cannibal sandwich" is popular among those of German descent; it uses sirloin, rye bread, salt, pepper, and chopped onions.

A popular street food in Mexico, carne tártara or carne apache, is a dish of ground beef cured in lime juice, like a ceviche.

=== South America ===
Chilean cuisine features a dish of prepared raw beef called crudos.

In southern Brazil, German immigrants influenced Hackepeter or carne de onça in Curitiba, where this dish is very common and served covered with chives.

=== Africa ===
Ethiopians have long eaten a dish of raw, minced beef called kitfo.

=== Asia ===
Raw meat is found in Nepalese cuisine, notably among the Newar of Kathmandu Valley.

=== Europe ===
In Belgium, a filet américain nature is served like steak tartare; pre-seasoned raw minced meat is a filet américain préparé, and used in the Martino sandwich.

In Sweden, it is råbiff (raw beef).

In Denmark, ''tartar'' is served on Danish dark rye bread, as a part of a smørrebrødsbord (smorgasbord).

In Poland, ''tatar'' is usually served with an egg yolk, chopped onions, pickles and bread, as an appetizer, especially with alcohol, usually vodka.

In Italy, raw beef in Piedmont is carne cruda all'albese (or battuta al coltello), often made with Fassona beef and seasoned simply with olive oil, lemon, salt, and pepper.

== See also ==
- Basashi – Japan, horse meat
- Carpaccio – Italy, beef
- Çiğ köfte – Turkey
- Crudo alemán – Chile
- Gored gored – Ethiopia
- Kachilaa – Nepal, buffalo or goat
- Kibbeh nayyeh – Levant
- Kitfo – Ethiopia
- Koi – Laos-Thailand
- Larb – Laos-Thailand
- List of beef dishes
- List of steak dishes
- Mett or hackepeter – Germany, pork
- Salmon tartare
- Sushi and sashimi – Japan, seafood
- Yukhoe – Korea

== Bibliography ==
- Linda Stradley, I'll Have What They're Having: Legendary Local Cuisine, Falcon, 2002
- Smith, Craig S. (6 April 2005). "The Raw Truth: Don't Blame the Mongols (or Their Horses)". The New York Times. Archived from the original on 2015-05-09.
- Raymond Sokolov, How to Cook, revised edition 2004, ISBN 0-06-008391-3, p. 41 at Google Books
- Albert Jack, What Caesar Did for My Salad: Not to Mention the Earl's Sandwich, Pavlova's Meringue and Other Curious Stories Behind Our Favourite Food, 2010, ISBN 1-84614-254-7, p. 141 at Google Books
