= Crudo alemán =

German-Chilean dish with raw beef and bread

Crudos
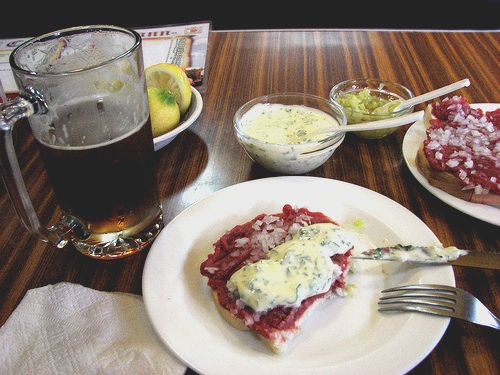
- Crudos served at Café Haussmann, Valdivia
- Place of origin: Chile
- Region or state: Southern Chile
- Main ingredients: Raw beef, bread, mayonnaise, onion, lemon juice, salt

A crudo alemán or bistec alemán (" German raw " or "German beefsteak") is a typical German-Chilean dish similar to a steak tartare. It is made by putting finely chopped raw beef mince onto a piece of pre-sliced white bread and then adding lemon juice, chopped onions and a sauce made of yogurt and mayonnaise.

Most probably it is derived from the German Mett, a preparation of minced pork, also served with chopped onions. The predominance of cattle farming in southern Chile in contrast to pig farming in Central Europe eventually led to a local adaptation, using beef instead of pork to recreate this traditional dish.

== See also ==
- List of beef dishes

== Sources ==
- Stephan Küeffner and Kristina Schreck. Frommer's Chile & Easter Island. 2007. Page 253.
