= Kibbeh nayyeh =

Levantine dish of raw ground meat

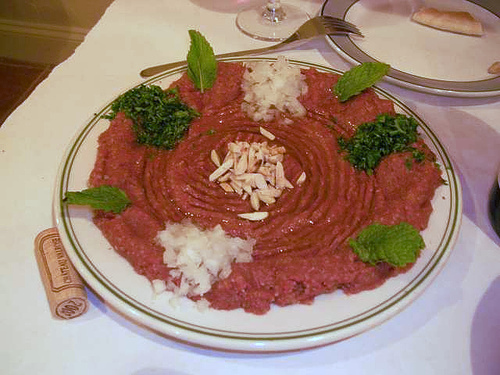
- Course: Mezze
- Region or state: Levant
- Main ingredients: Minced raw lamb or beef or goat meat, bulgur, spices

Kibbeh nayyeh or raw kibbeh (Arabic: كبّه نيّه) is a Levantine mezze that consists of minced raw lamb (or beef) mixed with fine bulgur and spices.

Kibbeh nayyeh is often served with mint leaves, olive oil, and green onions. Pita bread is used to scoop it. It is sometimes served with a sauce of garlic or olive oil. Leftovers are then cooked to create a different dish.

Many recipes call for kibbe nayyeh as the "shell" for cooked kibbeh. In this case, however, the kibbe is rolled into a ball and stuffed with lamb, onions, pine nuts and spices, then fried.

As in other dishes based on raw meat, health departments urge to exercise extreme caution when preparing and eating this kind of food.

== Preparation ==
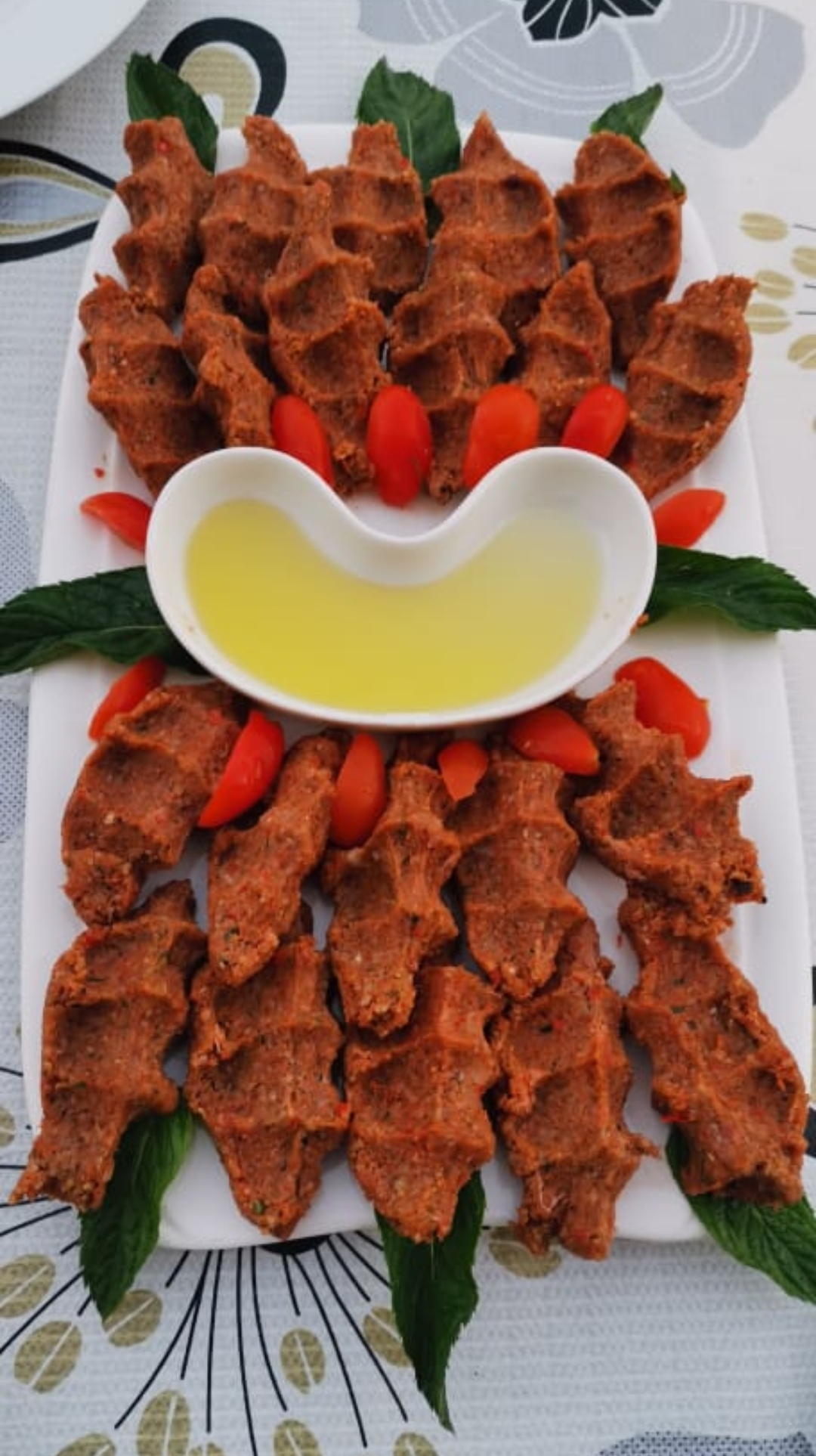
Lebanese frakeh

Traditionally, kibbeh nayyeh was prepared in a mortar and pestle and using fresh meat, slaughtered on the same day.

Frakeh (Levantine Arabic: فراكة) is a variation of raw kibbeh that is popular in Southern Lebanon, it is shaped into croquettes, and the meat is mixed with a variety of herbs and a spice mix called kammouneh (Levantine Arabic: كمونة), such as dried roses, marjoram, and cumin.

== History ==
There are different stories about the origins of kibbeh nayyeh; however, the most likely theory is that it developed in Aleppo, Syria. The inhabitants of Aleppo would slaughter animals on Sundays and feast days and eat the fresh meat raw. The other existing theory states that it dates back to 13th-century Mount Lebanon.

Historical texts indicate that raw kibbeh was being consumed in the rural Levant as early as the 19th century, a recorded recipe for it can be found in a 1951 cookbook by Lebanese author George al-Rayyis.

== Culture ==
Today, kibbeh nayyeh is most popular in Lebanon and Syria. It is also consumed by Druze in Israel. Kibbeh nayyeh is a popular dish among Christians of the Levant on regular and holiday occasions such as Christmas and Easter, as well as the Shia of Lebanon on their holidays.

Raw kibbeh is served in Lebanese weddings, often to hundreds of guests, requiring special care to prevent poisoning, as well as weddings in the Galilee region. Author Reem Kassis, whose father is from the Galilee, has stated, "There’s no wedding in a Galilee village without kibbe nayyah." Fish are sometimes used as a substitute for meat in the Galilee. Given its association with celebrations, communities in the Galilee (sometimes entire villages) refrained from preparing kibbeh nayyeh during times of mourning or misfortune.

Muslims in Lebanon celebrate Eid al-Adha by preparing kibbeh nayyeh with the meat of the sacrificed animal.

== See also ==
- Çiğ köfte, a similar dish
- Kafta, a similar dish
- Kitfo, a similar dish
- Mett, similar German dish
- Steak tartare
- Kibbeh safarjaliyeh
- List of beef dishes
- List of lamb dishes
- List of meat dishes
