= Martino sandwich =

Belgian sandwich

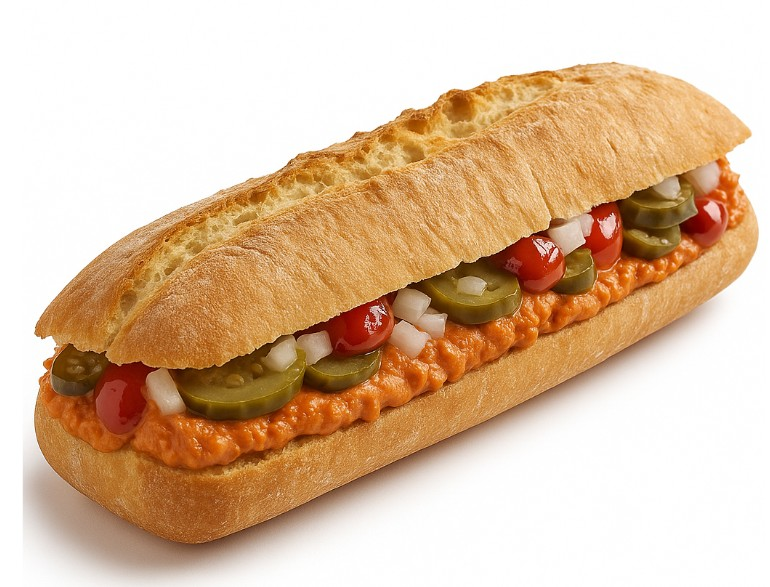
- Type: Sandwich
- Place of origin: Belgium
- Serving temperature: Cold
- Main ingredients: Baguette, filet américain, pickles, onions, spicy condiments

Martino is a sandwich popular in Flanders, Belgium, and surrounding areas made with filet américain (or americain préparé/steak tartare), spicy condiments, pickles, and onions, usually served on a baguette. It was created in the 1950s but the origins are disputed.

== History ==
The sandwich's origin story is disputed between Antwerp and Ghent.

Some sources attribute the creation of the sandwich to former footballer and restaurateur Albert De Hert, who operated a sandwich shop near Antwerp's De Coninckplein. According to this version, the sandwich is named after Antwerp footballer Theo Maertens, a friend of De Hert with whom he had played on Entente Anversoise. According to local legend, Maertens, who referred to himself as "Martino", requested a spicy sandwich to cure a hangover while visiting De Hert’s sandwich bar in Antwerp in 1951. He ordered an americain préparé sandwich and asked De Hert to "put everything you have in the cooler on it." De Hert assembled a sandwich with chopped onion, pickle slices, Tabasco, pili-pili, cayenne pepper, ketchup, and Worcestershire sauce, all served on a baguette.

Another version is that the sandwich was first produced at a snack bar named Martino in Ghent in 1954 when owner Raymond Noë created it for a boxer named Martino, topping it with tomato, gherkin, anchovies, pili-pili and mustard.

In Ghent, the Martino sandwich became closely associated with the iconic sandwich bar ’t Hoekske, located at the corner of Sint-Kwintensberg and Kortrijksepoortstraat. Open 24/7 for over three decades, it was a popular late-night stop for students and locals alike. Its Martino sandwich was so iconic that even newlyweds once stopped there in full wedding attire for a bite. The shop closed in 2021, marking the end of an era for many Ghent residents who considered it part of the city's culinary identity.

== Ingredients ==
A typical Martino sandwich includes filet américain (also called americain préparé) and some combination of pickles, onions, and spicy condiments such as mustard, Tabasco, Worcestershire sauce, cayenne pepper, and ketchup. It is typically created on a baguette and served cold.

== Popularity ==
According to Gazet van Antwerpen, the sandwich was "a sensation in Antwerp's nightlife" in the 1950s. According to Het Nieuwsblad, the sandwich is "a household name" in Ghent.

== See also ==
- List of sandwiches
- Belgian cuisine
