= Top Chef: Wisconsin =

Season 21 of American television series

- Season 21
- Hosted by: Kristen Kish
- Judges: Tom Colicchio; Gail Simmons
- No. of contestants: 16
- Winner: Danny Garcia
- Runners-up: Dan Jacobs; Savannah Miller
- Location: Milwaukee and Madison, Wisconsin
- Finals venue: The Caribbean
- Fan Favorite: Michelle Wallace
- No. of episodes: 14

Release
- Original network: Bravo
- Original release: March 20 – June 19, 2024

Season chronology
- ← Previous; World All-Stars Next → Destination Canada

Top Chef: Wisconsin is the twenty-first season of the American reality television series Top Chef. The season was filmed in Milwaukee and Madison, Wisconsin, marking the series' first return to the Midwestern United States since Top Chef: Chicago. The season finale was filmed aboard the MS Eurodam in the Caribbean, with stops in Curaçao and Aruba. Top Chef: Seattle winner Kristen Kish replaces Padma Lakshmi as host, following Lakshmi's departure from the show after the previous season. A new digital aftershow, titled The Dish with Kish, debuted alongside the returning Last Chance Kitchen web series.

This season introduced new rules to the competition. Immunity from elimination was no longer awarded for winning Quickfire Challenges. Instead, immunity could only be won through Elimination Challenges, making the winning chef safe in the next episode. The contestants were given the opportunity to earn cash prizes at every Quickfire. In addition, Tom Colicchio and Gail Simmons joined Kish to judge the Quickfire Challenges during the latter half of the season, at which point, the chefs' Quickfire performances were factored into elimination decisions.

Top Chef: Wisconsin premiered on March 20, 2024, and concluded on June 19, 2024. In the season finale, Danny Garcia was declared the winner over runners-up Dan Jacobs and Savannah Miller. Michelle Wallace was voted Fan Favorite.

== Production ==
Top Chef: Wisconsin was produced in partnership with the Wisconsin Economic Development Corporation (WEDC) and in collaboration with Travel Wisconsin, Visit Milwaukee, Destination Madison, Destination Door County, Dairy Farmers of Wisconsin, and the Wisconsin State Cranberry Growers Association. Travel Wisconsin coordinated a total of $1.3 million in production incentives from the WEDC, tourism partners, and agricultural marketing organizations.

The show's scouting team was brought out to Wisconsin in November 2022 and visited 56 locations in total. Filming took place over six weeks from August through September 2023. The Top Chef kitchen was set up inside a former ink printing warehouse located in Oak Creek.

Discussions for a Wisconsin-themed season date back to 2019. Chef and restaurateur Paul Bartolotta, who appeared as a guest judge on Top Chef: Las Vegas in 2009, has been credited for continuously advocating for Milwaukee as a potential host city. Series showrunner Doneen Arquines stated regional diversity was an important factor in choosing Wisconsin as the next Top Chef location, as the show had not filmed in the Midwest since Season 4. Detroit, Michigan and Minneapolis, Minnesota were also considered. Wisconsin had previously been on the short list for Season 19. Houston, Texas was eventually chosen after the 2021 Ryder Cup golf tournament moved to Whistling Straits in Kohler, Wisconsin and hotels booked up.

When Padma Lakshmi announced her departure from Top Chef to focus on Taste the Nation, her books, and other creative pursuits, Magical Elves Productions' chief executive Casey Kriley stated Kristen Kish was their clear choice for Lakshmi's replacement. The executives at NBCUniversal, which owns Bravo, claimed they never interviewed anyone else for the position.

== Contestants ==
The cast of Top Chef: Wisconsin initially consisted of 15 chefs. A sixteenth contestant, Soo Ahn, started in the Last Chance Kitchen and eventually joined the main competition following its fifth episode. Kévin D'Andrea previously competed on the sixth season of Top Chef France.

Name	Hometown	Current Residence (Note: The contestants' city and state of residence during time of filming.)
Soo Ahn	Seoul, South Korea/Tacoma, Washington	Chicago, Illinois
Manny Barella	Monterrey, Nuevo León, Mexico	Denver, Colorado
Kaleena Bliss	Seattle, Washington	Chicago, Illinois
Kévin D'Andrea	Oloron-Sainte-Marie, France	Austin, Texas
Alisha Elenz	Palatine, Illinois	Chicago, Illinois
Danny Garcia	Brooklyn, New York	
Valentine Howell Jr.	Boston, Massachusetts	Dorchester, Massachusetts
Dan Jacobs	Chicago, Illinois	Milwaukee, Wisconsin
Savannah Miller	Southern Pines, North Carolina	Durham, North Carolina
David Murphy	Houston, Texas	San Francisco, California
Kenny Nguyen	Philadelphia, Pennsylvania	Athens, Georgia
Laura Ozyilmaz	Acapulco, Mexico	San Francisco, California
Charly Pierre	Cambridge, Massachusetts	New Orleans, Louisiana
Amanda Turner	Arlington, Texas	Austin, Texas
Rasika Venkatesa	Chennai, India	New York, New York
Michelle Wallace	St. Louis, Missouri	Houston, Texas

== Contestant progress ==
Episode #		1	2	3	4	5	6	7	8	9	10	11	12	13	14
Quickfire Challenge Results		N/A	Laura ★ Kévin ↑ Michelle ↑ Danny ↓ Kenny ↓ Valentine ↓	Rasika ★ Kévin ↑ Savannah ↑ Alisha ↓ Charly ↓ Kenny ↓	N/A	Charly ★ Laura ↑ Manny ↑ Amanda ↓ Kévin ↓ Michelle ↓	Michelle ★ Amanda ↑ Kaleena ↑ Dan ↓ Danny ↓ Manny ↓	Danny ★ Amanda ↑ Kévin ↑	N/A	Danny ★ Dan ↑ Michelle ↑ Amanda ↓ Laura ↓ Manny ↓	Savannah ★ Soo ↑ Dan ↓ Danny ↓ Manny ↓ Michelle ↓	Savannah ★ Dan ↑ Michelle ↑ Danny ↓ Laura ↓ Manny ↓	Manny ★^{4} Savannah ★ Danny ↑ Laura ↑ Dan ↓ Manny ↓^{4}	Dan ★	N/A
Contestant		Elimination Challenge Results													
1	Danny	HIGH	IN	IN	WIN	IN	WIN^{1}	IN	HIGH	IN	WIN	HIGH	LOW	WIN	WINNER
2	Dan	IN	IN	HIGH	IN	WIN^{1}	HIGH	LOW	WIN	HIGH	HIGH	HIGH	LOW	IN	RUNNER-UP
2	Savannah	IN	IN	IN	IN	HIGH	HIGH	LOW	HIGH	WIN	LOW	IN	WIN	LOW	RUNNER-UP
4	Laura	IN	IN	IN	IN	LOW	IN	IN	LOW	OUT		WIN^{3}	HIGH	OUT	
5	Manny	WIN^{1}	HIGH	LOW	IN	LOW	IN	IN	LOW	IN	LOW	LOW	OUT		
6	Michelle	HIGH	IN	WIN^{1}	IN	HIGH	LOW	WIN	HIGH	LOW	HIGH	OUT			
7	Soo						HIGH^{2}	IN	LOW	HIGH	OUT				
8	Amanda	LOW	IN	IN	IN	IN	IN	HIGH	HIGH	OUT					
9	Kaleena	IN	IN	HIGH	OUT		IN^{2}	HIGH	OUT						
10	Kévin	IN	LOW	LOW	IN	IN	IN	OUT							
11	Rasika	IN	WIN^{1}	IN	WIN^{1}	IN	OUT								
12	Charly	IN	LOW	IN	IN	OUT									
13	Alisha	IN	IN	IN	OUT										
14	Kenny	LOW	HIGH	OUT											
15	Valentine	IN	OUT												
16	David	OUT													

^Note 1: The chef(s) won immunity for the next Elimination Challenge.
^Note 2: Following Episode 5 of Last Chance Kitchen, Kaleena rejoined the competition and Soo was introduced as a new competitor.
^Note 3: Following the final episode of Last Chance Kitchen, Laura rejoined the competition.
^Note 4: Manny won the first part of the blind taste test in Episode 12 but placed in the bottom for the second part of the challenge.

Quickfire Challenge
★ The chef won the Quickfire Challenge.
↑ The chef was selected as one of the top entries in the Quickfire Challenge but did not win.
↓ The chef was selected as one of the bottom entries in the Quickfire Challenge.
Elimination Challenge
(WINNER) The chef won the season and was crowned "Top Chef".
(RUNNER-UP) The chef was a runner-up for the season.
(WIN) The chef won the Elimination Challenge.
(HIGH) The chef was selected as one of the top entries in the Elimination Challenge but did not win.
(IN) The chef was not selected as one of the top or bottom entries in the Elimination Challenge and was safe.
(LOW) The chef was selected as one of the bottom entries in the Elimination Challenge but was not eliminated.
(OUT) The chef lost the Elimination Challenge.

== Episodes ==
No. overall	No. in season	Title	Original release date	US viewers (millions)
303	1	"Chef's Test"	March 20, 2024	0.49
Elimination Challenge: The chefs were separated into three groups led by host Kristen Kish, head judge Tom Colicchio, and judge Gail Simmons, each of whom assigned their group a unique test: Gail's group had to create stuffed pasta dishes; Kristen's group had to make soup; and Tom's group had to prepare roasted chicken dishes (which were required to include both white meat and dark meat). The dishes were served at Lupi & Iris restaurant. The judges selected their favorite and least favorite dish in each group. The overall favorite was declared the winner and received immunity for the next Elimination Challenge. The three contestants with the judges' least favorite dishes then cooked against each other in a sudden-death cook-off, creating any dish of their choosing using leftover ingredients from the kitchen. The loser of the cook-off was eliminated. The guest judges were chefs Paul Bartolotta and Adam Siegel.: Gail's Group (Stuffed Pasta): Alisha, David, Kévin, Michelle, Rasika; Kristen's Group (Soup): Amanda, Charly, Dan, Laura, Manny; Tom's Group (Roasted Chicken): Danny, Kaleena, Kenny, Savannah, Valentine; Winner: Manny (Green Pozole with Chicken & Charred Salsa Verde); Eliminated: David (Mushroom Stuffed Gnocchi with Speck & Chicken Liver Gravy, Mascarpone & Calabrian Chili; Poached Shrimp with Sungold Tomatoes, Coconut Cilantro Broth & Green Curry Sauce)
304	2	"Living the High Life"	March 27, 2024	0.49
Quickfire Challenge: The chefs had 30 minutes to create dishes incorporating hops. The winner received US$5,000. The guest judge was Top Chef: Colorado winner Joe Flamm.: Winner: Laura (Hop Infused Rice Pudding with Berries); Elimination Challenge: The chefs, split into two teams, created seven-course progressive menus elevating the following bar snacks: popcorn, pickles, pretzels, mixed nuts, potato chips, olives, and toasted corn kernels. The meals were served inside the Historic Miller Caves. The winner received immunity for the next Elimination Challenge and US$10,000 from the Miller Brewing Company. The guest diners included Joe Flamm, chefs Kyle Knall, Luke Zahm, and Jamie Brown-Soukaseume, restaurateur Omar Shaikh, Miller High Life representative Carol Walker, and comedian Charlie Berens.: Red Team: Amanda, Charly, Danny, Kaleena, Kévin, Laura, Valentine; Yellow Team: Alisha, Dan, Kenny, Manny, Michelle, Rasika, Savannah; Winner: Rasika (Barley Pretzel Cake with Pretzel Granita & Honey Mustard Sabayon); Eliminated: Valentine (Beer & Corn Soup, Pickled Fresno Peppers & Toasted Corn Kernels)
305	3	"Take It Cheesy"	April 3, 2024	0.49
Quickfire Challenge: The chefs were presented with numerous miniature doors. The contestants took turns opening doors, each concealing a random ingredient. As the winner of the previous Elimination Challenge, Rasika was allowed to choose her door first. They then had 30 minutes to create dishes pairing their mystery ingredient with Door County cherries. The winner received US$5,000. The guest judges were actress Clea DuVall and Top Chef: New York runner-up/All-Stars finalist Carla Hall.: Winner: Rasika (Tart Cherry Cipollini Onions, Charred Pepper Relish & Berbere Spice); Elimination Challenge: The chefs were randomly assigned one of thirteen different cheeses. They were then asked to make dishes featuring their designated cheeses for a Top Chef cheese festival held at the Cupola Barn in Oconomowoc. The dishes were served to the judging panel and one hundred festival guests. The guests' votes determined the top dishes and winner of the challenge, while the judges selected the bottom dishes. The winner received immunity for the next Elimination Challenge. The guest judges were Carla Hall and chef Dane Baldwin.: Winner: Michelle (Coconut Curry Collard Green Saag with Pleasant Ridge Reserve Potato Fritter); Eliminated: Kenny (Crab Rangoon Salad with Gorgonzola Crème Fraîche Crema, Luxardo Cherry Relish & Rice Paper Chip)
306	4	"The Wright Way"	April 10, 2024	0.52
Elimination Challenge: The chefs traveled to Madison and toured buildings designed by architect Frank Lloyd Wright. Working in pairs, the contestants had to take inspiration from Wright's architectural style and create dishes featuring the theme of duality. The dishes were served at the Riverview Terrace Restaurant in Spring Green. The winning pair received US$10,000, though only one person received immunity for the next Elimination Challenge. Both members of the losing team were eliminated. The guest judges were chef Dominique Crenn and Top Chef: Houston/World All-Stars winner Buddha Lo.: Winners: Rasika (Daal Quenelle, Pickled Beets, Carrot Purée & Rasam) and Danny (Scallop Mousse, Zucchini & Green Chartreuse) (Note: Though Rasika and Danny were declared the winning team and split the cash prize, only Rasika received immunity for having the judges' overall favorite dish.); Eliminated: Alisha (Sea - Aguachile with Shrimp, Cucumber & Lime) and Kaleena (Land - Mushroom & Goat Cheese Cheesecake, Sesame Tuile, Candied Mushrooms & Spruce Syrup)
307	5	"Supper Club"	April 17, 2024	0.54
Quickfire Challenge: Prior to learning about their challenge, the chefs were instructed to buy ingredients from Madison's Dane County Farmers' Market. Then, after arriving at the rooftop of L'Etoile Restaurant, they were given 30 minutes to create dishes pairing their ingredients from the farmers' market with one of ten different sauces from the first cookbook of Carson Gulley, the head chef at the University of Wisconsin–Madison from 1926–1954. The winner received US$7,500. The guest judges were comedian/activist W. Kamau Bell and chef/owner Tory Miller.: Winner: Charly (Creole Sauce - Fingerling Potato with Honey & Tomato Chèvre & Roasted Pepper Creole Sauce); Elimination Challenge: The chefs were invited to a supper club meal at the Harvey House, a former train depot-turned restaurant. They were then divided into two teams and asked to prepare their own supper club menus for the judges and forty guest diners. Their menus were required to include a relish tray (a platter of pickles, fresh vegetables, olives and other finger foods), fish dish, chicken dish, beef dish, and dessert. The winner received immunity for the next Elimination Challenge. The guest diners included W. Kamau Bell, Tory Miler, pastry chef Kristine Miller, chef/co-owner Joe Papach, and creative director/co-owner Shaina Papach.: Green Team: Amanda, Charly, Danny, Laura, Manny; Purple Team: Dan, Kévin, Michelle, Rasika, Savannah; Winner: Dan (Relish Tray - Crudités in "Soil", Steak Tartare, Chicken Liver Mousse, Pickled Shallots & Fried Seed Toast); Eliminated: Charly (Fish Dish - Epis Rubbed Fried Trout, Coconut Epis Sauce & Preserved Lemon Pikliz)
308	6	"Chaos Cuisine"	April 24, 2024	0.54
Quickfire Challenge: The chefs had 45 minutes to produce dairy-forward desserts. The winner received US$7,500. The guest judge was chef/founder Christina Tosi. Following Episode 5 of Last Chance Kitchen, Kaleena rejoined the competition and Soo was introduced as a new competitor. Since Tom Colicchio allowed two contestants through Last Chance Kitchen, Kristen Kish informed the cast that the judges reserved the right to eliminate two people during any future Elimination Challenge without prior warning.: Winner: Michelle (Corn Cake with Mascarpone Cheese, Basil Cream & Lemon Zest); Elimination Challenge: The chefs were challenged with making dishes exemplifying "chaos cooking", a trend similar to fusion cuisine that disregards all culinary convention, which became popular with social media chefs during COVID-19 lockdown. The winner received immunity for the next Elimination Challenge. The guest judges were chef/actor Matty Matheson, chef/owner Phillip Foss, and chef/writer Sophia Roe.: Winner: Danny (Scallop Chou Farci with Yuzu Kosho Foam); Eliminated: Rasika (Crab & Eggplant with Mushroom Conserva, Dukkah & Garlic Tahini)
309	7	"Sausage Race"	May 1, 2024	0.58
Quickfire Challenge: The chefs first had 20 minutes to create flambéed dishes. The top three contestants then competed in the second round, where they were required to cook charred dishes in 20 minutes. The winner received US$20,000 from Finish. The guest judge was Top Chef: Las Vegas/Top Chef: All-Stars L.A. runner-up Bryan Voltaggio.: Winner: Danny (Grilled Prawns with Satsuma & Habanero Sauce, Flambé Mezcal; Charred Branzino with Charred Poblano Purée & Charred Avocado); Elimination Challenge: The chefs competed in a team challenge inspired by the Milwaukee Brewers Sausage Race. The teams served dishes based on the five racing sausages − bratwurst, Polish sausage, Italian sausage, hot dog, and chorizo − in five head-to-head matches for the judges and 15 guests at American Family Field. The judges and guests voted for their favorite dish in each round. The first team to score three points was safe from elimination, and the chef with the overall favorite dish was declared the winner. Beginning with this Elimination Challenge, immunity was no longer available as a reward. The guest judges included Bryan Voltaggio, Top Chef: California runner-up/World All-Stars contestant Amar Santana, actress Brittany Snow, and former professional baseball player Ryan Braun.: Blue Team: Dan, Kévin, Manny, Savannah, Soo; Yellow Team: Amanda, Danny, Kaleena, Laura, Michelle; Winner: Michelle (Étouffée with Creamy Grits); Eliminated: Kévin (Risotto with Roasted Parmesan Emulsion & Fennel)
310	8	"Restaurant Wars"	May 8, 2024	0.52
Elimination Challenge: The chefs competed in Restaurant Wars at the Discovery World museum. Each team was responsible for developing a three-course menu (with each course offering at least two different options), decorating their restaurant, and serving their dishes to the judges and 75 guest diners. Due to the odd number of competitors remaining, one team had five members, while the other had four. As the winner of the previous Elimination Challenge, Michelle was able to join the team of her choosing. The judging panel was also split into two groups. One group consisted of Tom Colicchio, Kristen Kish, Top Chef: California contestant Kwame Onwuachi, and chef Andrew Kroeger; the other group consisted of Gail Simmons, Top Chef: Chicago winner Stephanie Izard, and chefs Erick Williams and Itaru Nagano. While the judges declared an individual winner, the winning team received US$40,000.: Dos by Deul: Kaleena (EC), Laura (FOH), Manny, Soo; First Course: Beef Tartare, Cilantro Green Goddess, Gochujang, Rice Cracker (Laura); Melon & Dungeness Crab Aguachile, Pickled Bamboo, Furikake Tostada (Kaleena); Second Course: Rice Cakes, Salsa Verde, Chinese Sausage & Pepita (Soo); Miso Butter Poached Shrimp, Kimchi Jicama & Bok Choy (Manny); Third Course: Beef Tenderloin with Mole Negro, Shimeji Mushrooms & Black Garlic (Manny); Pork Tenderloin à la Talla, Charred Pineapple, Black Bean & Onion Purée (Team Dish); Channel: Amanda, Dan, Danny (EC), Michelle (FOH), Savannah; First Course: Smoked Walleye, Labneh, Potato Cake, Harissa (Dan); Chawanmushi with Scallop, Maitake, Ikura (Savannah); Second Course: Fried Catfish with Dirty Rice Cake (Michelle); "New England Clam Chowder" - Grilled Carrots with Old Bay, Clams & Thyme (Danny); Vegan Gumbo Z'Herbes - Greens, Grilled Mushrooms & Kombu (Amanda); Third Course: Honey Custard, Jasmine Tea & Citrus Gelée, Buckwheat Crumble (Danny & Amanda); Maple Crémeux, Blueberry, Pistachio & Caramel (Dan); Winning Team: Channel; Winner: Dan; Eliminated: Kaleena
311	9	"The Good Land"	May 15, 2024	0.50
Quickfire Challenge: The chefs had 30 minutes to produce creative dishes using fresh cranberries. The winner received US$10,000. The guest judge was fifth-generation cranberry farmer Rochelle Hoffman. From this point forward, Tom Colicchio and Gail Simmons joined Kristen Kish to judge the Quickfire Challenges. In addition, a new rule was implemented: while the contestants' Elimination Challenge dishes still determined who would be eligible to be sent home, their Quickfire dishes would now be factored into elimination decisions at Judges' Table.: Winner: Danny (Cranberry-Poached Sea Bass with Cranberry Panade); Elimination Challenge: The chefs were treated to a family-style indigenous meal prepared by guest judges Elena Terry and Sean Sherman. The contestants were then tasked with cooking their own modern dishes incorporating indigenous ingredients. They were prohibited from using any ingredients not endemic to North America, including dairy, wheat flour, cane sugar, pork, beef, and chicken. The dishes were served at the restaurant Il Cervo to the judges, Terry, Sherman, and chefs Jessica Walks First and Bryce Stevenson. The winner received an advantage in the next Elimination Challenge.: Winner: Savannah (Squash & Maple Jelly Cake with Aronia Berries, Grapes & Plum Jelly); Eliminated: Amanda (Elk Tataki Tartare, Confit Mushrooms, Pipián Rojo & Duck Fat Totilla) and Laura (Duck Tamal Wrapped in Mustard Greens with Huckleberry Sauce & Haroset)
312	10	"Door County Fish Boil"	May 22, 2024	0.49
Quickfire Challenge: The chefs participated in a meat raffle with guest judge Art Smith. Smith randomly drew the contestants' names from a bingo cage, determining their selection order. The available options, which were first-come, first-served, included wagyu ribeye, chateaubriand, luncheon meat, ground chicken, bologna, corned beef, and lamb chops. They then had 30 minutes to create dishes with their chosen protein. The winner received US$10,000.: Winner: Savannah (Crispy Corned Beef & Beet Salad, Crème Fraîche & Pickled Celery); Elimination Challenge: The chefs participated in a beachside fish boil. They were all provided the same whitefish to use in their dishes, and were each required to make two side items. In addition, the contestants' shopping was done by six Top Chef alumni: Top Chef: Boston winner Mei Lin, Top Chef: California winner Jeremy Ford, Top Chef: Boston runner-up/All-Stars L.A. finalist Gregory Gourdet, Top Chef: Kentucky/World All-Stars runner-up Sara Bradley, Top Chef: Portland runner-up Shota Nakajima, and Top Chef: Kentucky competitor Justin Sutherland. As the winner of the previous Elimination Challenge, Savannah was able to choose which alum would shop for her. She picked Shota, while the other all-stars were randomly assigned to the remaining chefs. The dishes were served at Grant Park Beach to the judges, all-stars, and 100 guest diners. The winner received an advantage in the next Elimination Challenge.: Winner: Danny (Sofrito Boil, Salsa Verde, Carrot Slaw, French Bean & Bonito Salad); Eliminated: Soo (Pineapple Curry Fish Boil, Fish Sauce Beurre Blanc, Twice-Cooked Potatoes, Crispy Corn Miso Slaw)
313	11	"Lay It All on the Table"	May 29, 2024	0.65
Quickfire Challenge: Following the Last Chance Kitchen finale, Laura rejoined the competition. Prior to the contestants' arrival at the Top Chef kitchen, Tom Colicchio cooked a dish for Kristen Kish and Gail Simmons to eat. The chefs then had 30 minutes to recreate his mystery dish. To deduce its identity, each person was allowed to ask him four "yes" or "no" questions during the cook (24 questions in total). They were also permitted to look at and smell (but not taste) the remnants of his dish on the plate. After time expired, the dish was revealed to be an Asian-inspired lobster stir fry. The chef with the closest creation to the original received US$10,000.: Winner: Savannah (Lobster Stir Fry with Red Fresno Chilis, Bok Choy & Garlic with Fish Sauce & Soy Sauce); Elimination Challenge: Taking inspiration from communal feasts such as kamayan, seafood boils, and grazing tables, as well as the works of Alinea chef/owner Grant Achatz and Disfrutar's "living table" experience, the chefs were asked to plate their dishes directly on a tabletop. As the winner of the previous Elimination Challenge, Danny received an extra 30 minutes of cooking time. The tables were served to Kish, Colicchio, Simmons and guest judge Curtis Duffy in the Top Chef kitchen. The winner received an advantage in the next Elimination Challenge.: Winner: Laura (Rose, Sour Cherry, Pistachio & Honey Sauce with Clotted Cream, Sour Cherry & Honey Maraş, Meringue & Baklava); Eliminated: Michelle (Cured Salmon, Salmon Mousse, Beet Biscuits, Pickled Beets with Capers, Eggs with Caviar, Fig & Bacon Jam, Seasoned Potato Chips)
314	12	"Goodbye, Wisconsin"	June 5, 2024	0.51
Quickfire Challenge: The chefs had five minutes to try to identify 26 ingredients in a blindfolded taste test. The person with the most correct answers received US$5,000. Then, the contestants had 30 minutes to cook dishes using their correctly identified ingredients. The chef with the overall favorite dish received US$10,000. The guest judge was chef Paul Bartolotta.: Winners: Manny (23/26 correct answers)^{4} and Savannah (Fried Pork Chop, Faux Caesar with Cheddar & Horseradish-Kalamata Olive Sauce); Elimination Challenge: For their final challenge in Wisconsin, the chefs created dishes exemplifying their time on Top Chef and their culinary growth throughout the season. As the winner of the previous Elimination Challenge, Laura received an extra 30 minutes of cooking time. The dishes were served at Harbor House to the judges and several guest diners, including Bartolotta; chefs Elena Terry, Tory Miller, Milunka Radicevic, Kyle Knall, and Dane Baldwin; and Food & Wine editor-in-chief Hunter Lewis. The winner received an advantage in the next Elimination Challenge.: Winner: Savannah (Potato Pavé, Burnt Onion & Cherry Jam, Chicken Sauce Reduction); Eliminated: Manny (Snapper à la Veracruzana with Creamy Potatoes & Saltines)
315	13	"Set Sail"	June 12, 2024	0.69
Quickfire Challenge: The chefs met in Curaçao for the final rounds of the competition. They were given 30 minutes to make dishes pairing lionfish with Gouda cheese. The winner received US$10,000. The guest judge was chef Helmi Smeulders. The contestants were also advised the results of this last Quickfire Challenge would not be considered during deliberations at Judges' Table.: Winner: Dan (Lionfish Tartare, Orange & Fresno Aguachile, Gouda Frico); Elimination Challenge: The chefs boarded the MS Eurodam, where they received a surprise dinner from Holland America Line's Global Fresh Fish Program ambassador Masaharu Morimoto. They were then asked to produce an eight-course fish tasting menu. Each finalist was responsible for two of the eight courses. In addition, each course was required to feature a different fish and preparation method. The available fish were Atlantic salmon, black bass, black grouper, dorade, monkfish, rainbow trout, red snapper, sea bream, and striped bass; the requested preparations included raw, steamed, mousse, poached, fried, roasted, smoked, and blackened. As the winner of the previous Elimination Challenge, Savannah was able to choose her fish and preparation methods first. The dishes were served in the ship's Tamarind restaurant for the judges, Top Chef: Texas contestant and guest judge Edward Lee, and several of the Eurodam crew. The winner received US$10,000 and a 10-day cruise from Holland America.: Winner: Danny (Mousse - Sea Bream Mousse, Fines Herbes Salad, Scotch Bonnet & Green Garlic Spheres; Smoked - Smoked Rainbow Trout, Plantain Pumpkin Purée, Hazelnut Lemon Relish); Eliminated: Laura (Steamed - Black Bass Recado Negro, Squash, Fried Plantain; Roasted - Grouper with Guajillo Pepper Glaze, Guajillo-XO Emulsion, Pineapple Broth)
316	14	"Cruising to a Win"	June 19, 2024	0.67
Elimination Challenge: After arriving in Aruba, the chefs were challenged with cooking the best four-course progressive meals of their lives. Previously eliminated contestants Laura, Manny, Michelle, Soo, Amanda, and Kaleena were brought onboard the Eurodam to offer their assistance to the final three competitors. Each finalist selected one person as their sous chef; Dan chose Amanda, Danny chose Manny, and Savannah chose Michelle. The finale meals were served in the ship's Pinnacle Grill steakhouse. The diners in attendance included guest judge Emeril Lagasse, Top Chef Canada judge David Zilber, restaurateur Bricia Lopez, and chefs Justin Pichetrungsi and Carrie Nahabedian.: Dan: First Course: Tuna Tartare, Ruby Red Grapefruit, Caribbean Pepper Purée, Garlic Chips & Black Garlic Labneh; Second Course: Grilled Snapper, Braised Pumpkin & Smoked Snapper Dashi; Third Course: Oxtail Ragu with Dumplings, Tomato Concasse, Pikliz of Cabbage, Carrots & Scallions; Fourth Course: Yogurt Mousse, Coriander Olive Oil, Grilled Pineapple, Salted Phyllo Crisp; Danny: First Course: Scallop & Habanero Leche de Tigre with Breadfruit & Nori Tuile; Second Course: Smoked Mussels with Plantains & Cabbage, Smoked Mussel Mayo & Fines Herbes Purée; Third Course: Spiny Lobster with Salsa Macha, Squash, Persimmon, Chaaza Sauce; Fourth Course: "Piragua con Leche", Melon Sorbet with Avocado Yogurt, Candied Seaweed & Condensed Milk Stamp; Savannah: First Course: Saltfish Fritter, Sweet Potato Purée, Pickled Mussel, Habanero Honey Glaze; Second Course: Spiny Lobster Agnolotti, Lobster Broth, Smoked Marcona Almonds & Grapes; Third Course: Seared Grouper, Epis Spice, Mofongo Plantains, Flying Fish Roe Butter Sauce; Fourth Course: "Hummingbird" Banana Upside-down Cake, Lime & Pineapple Granita, Rum Coconut Sauce; Winner: Danny; Runners-up: Dan, Savannah

== Last Chance Kitchen ==
No.	Title	Original air date
1	"The 16th Chef"	March 27, 2024
Challenge: In a surprise twist, Valentine competed against a secret sixteenth contestant, Soo, who was vying for a spot in the main competition. They were given 30 minutes to make comfort food using high-end ingredients, such as truffles, saffron, caviar, and whole lobsters. Their dishes also had to pair well with beer.: Valentine: New England Lobster Bake - Poached Lobster, Andouille Sausage, Corn & Turmeric Purée; Soo: Fish & Chips - Fried Lobster, Rice Chips & Caviar Tartar Sauce; Winner: Soo; Eliminated: Valentine
2	"The Big Stink"	April 3, 2024
Challenge: Soo and Kenny had 20 minutes to cook dishes featuring Limburger cheese.: Soo: Eggplant Parm with Ponzu Pomodoro Sauce & Brûléed Limburger Cheese; Kenny: Vietnamese Rice Paper Pizza with Egg Base, Chili Crisp, Grilled Cantaloupe & Limburger Cheese Sauce; Winner: Soo; Eliminated: Kenny
3	"Plates Aplenty"	April 10, 2024
Challenge: Soo, Alisha, and Kaleena were presented with an assortment of plates, bowls, cups, and other vessels. They then had 30 minutes to create composed dishes inspired by their chosen plating option. Two contestants advanced to the next round.: Soo: Lamb Loin Carpaccio with Aged Balsamic, Mint, Basil & Fennel; Glazed Halibut with Strawberry Bisque; Alisha: Aguachile with Cucumber, Jicama, Avocado, Poached Shrimp & Cilantro; Kaleena: Beef Tartare with Mirin, Ponzu, Fish Sauce & Soy; Beef Tataki with Kimchi, Pear & Fennel; Charred Ribeye with Miso & Cauliflower Purée; Winners: Soo and Kaleena; Eliminated: Alisha
4	"Mid-Season Finale Part 1 / Part 2"	April 17, 2024
Challenge (Part 1): Soo, Kaleena, and Charly had 30 minutes to make a breakfast version of a club sandwich.: Soo: Breakfast Club with Pork Cutlet, Eggs, Fried Raisin Bread, Orange Marmalade, Cheddar & Mornay Sauce; Kaleena: Toasted Croissant with Bacon, Tomato Chutney, Poached Egg & Chipotle Hollandaise Sauce; Charly: Sandwich with Fried Plantains, Grilled Skirt Steak, Pikliz, Avocado & Harissa Cream Sauce; Winner: Kaleena; Eliminated: None; Challenge (Part 2): Soo, Kaleena, and Charly had 30 minutes to create dishes showcasing themselves and their culinary styles in a single bite. As the winner of the previous challenge, Kaleena was given an additional five minutes of cooking time. The winners earned spots in the main competition.: Soo: Caesar Salad with Black Garlic & Fish Sauce Dressing, Fried Anchovy, Pecorino & Aged Balsamic; Kaleena: Grilled Venison with Miso Sweet Potato Purée, Mushrooms, Daikon & Pear; Charly: Espagueti with Smoked Herring, Andouille Sausage & Egg Yolk Sauce; Winners: Soo and Kaleena; Eliminated: Charly
5	"Let's Play Ball"	May 1, 2024
Challenge: Rasika and Kévin competed in a baseball-themed cook-off. They were allowed to cook up to nine separate dishes, one for each inning, within their allotted 45-minute time limit. Each dish received a score between 0 - 4. The chef with the most points at the end of the game was declared the winner.: Rasika: Rice Payasam (1 point); Berbere Eggplant with Corn & Pepper Salad (2 points); Bisi Bele Bhath - Rice & Lentils with Roasted Potato Curry (2 points); Sea Bass with Green Chutney, Tomato & Plum Salad (1 point); Kévin: Roasted Lamb with Panko, Garlic & Demi-Glace (3 points); Scallop with Butternut Purée & Herb Salad (2 points); Poireaux Vinaigrette with Chive & Parsley Salad (1 point); Charred Butter Lettuce with Salmon, Herbs & Yogurt Sauce (1 point); Smoked Salmon with Dill Cream (1 point); Winner: Kévin; Eliminated: Rasika
6	"Restaurant Wars Shake Up"	May 8, 2024
Challenge: Prior to the challenge, Kaleena informed Tom Colicchio that she was withdrawing from Last Chance Kitchen, choosing to prioritize her mental health over competing again. Tom then offered Kaleena's spot to Rasika, giving her a second chance against Kévin. They had 45 minutes to make one savory dish and one sweet dish representing their own restaurant concept.: Kévin (French Bistro): Beef Tenderloin with Pomme Purée, Duxelle, Vin Jaune Sauce & Hazelnuts; Roasted Berries with Basil Oil, Fleur de Sel Crumble, Chantilly Mascarpone & Vanilla Tuile; Rasika (South Indian): Mangalore Fish Curry with String Hopper; Yuzu Custard with Berbere Spiced Fruits & Cashews; Winner: Kévin; Eliminated: Rasika
7	"A Top Chef Classic Part 1 / Part 2"	May 15, 2024
Challenge (Part 1): Kévin, Amanda, and Laura competed in a mise en place relay race. The chefs were presented with fifteen different ingredients, each with an assigned prep task. The ingredients were available on a first-come, first-served basis, and the contestants were required to complete five tasks each. Their placement in the race determined their cook time for the second part of the challenge.: Amanda (1st): Separate 18 eggs; Supreme 6 lemons; Supreme 6 oranges; Grate 1 quart of cheese; Supreme 6 limes; Kévin (2nd): Break down 4 chickens; Shuck 12 ears of corn; Peel and slice 1 quart of cremini mushrooms; Dice 6 onions; Peel 4 heads of garlic; Laura (3rd): Fillet 2 sea bass; De-rib and chiffonade 3 bunches of kale; De-seed 3 pomegranates; Pick 3 bunches of parsley; Brunoise 3 bell peppers; Challenge (Part 2): Kévin, Amanda, and Laura had to create dishes using their prepped ingredients from the race. Amanda received 30 minutes of cooking time, while Kévin and Laura received 25 and 20 minutes, respectively. Two contestants advanced to the next round.: Amanda: Citrus Cake with Pernod Sabayon, Cheddar Cheese Frico & Brûléed Citrus; Kévin: Chicken Thigh & Breast with Confit Onion, Roasted Corn, Chicken & Mushroom Bouillon; Laura: Grilled Sea Bass with Kale & Tahini Spread, Yellow Harissa & Olive Tapenade; Winners: Amanda and Laura; Eliminated: Kévin
8	"Last Chance Kitchen Finale Part 1 / Part 2"	May 22, 2024
Challenge (Part 1): Amanda, Laura, and Soo had 30 minutes to make cohesive dishes incorporating elements from every Quickfire Challenge of the season: hops (Episode 2), cherries (Episode 3), sauce (Episode 5), dairy (Episode 6), flambé (Episode 7), cranberries (Episode 9), and a meat raffle protein (Episode 10). Kristen Kish joined Tom Colicchio to judge the dishes.: Amanda: Hops Smoked Wagyu Ribeye with Potato Purée Sauce, Flambéed Cherry & Cranberry Relish; Laura: Wagyu Kebabs with Babaganoush, Cranberry & Pepper Relish, Hop Schug Sauce & Flambéed Cherry Sauce; Soo: Chateaubriand with Sourdough Hop Purée, Cranberry & Cherry Sauce, Compressed Carrot & Celery; Eliminated: Soo; Challenge (Part 2): Amanda and Laura were given 30 minutes for their final Last Chance Kitchen task: cook a "great plate of food". The winner returned to the main competition. Mei Lin joined Tom Colicchio and Kristen Kish as a guest judge.: Amanda: Gnocchi with Scallops, Corn, Charred Onion & Shrimp Boil Sauce; Laura: Zeytinyagli Vegetables, Celery Root, Artichoke, Mushroom with Crab Salad; Winner: Laura; Eliminated: Amanda
