= Fast Foodies =

American reality bake-off competition show

- Genre: Reality television; cooking show; comedy
- Presented by: Jeremy Ford; Kristen Kish; Justin Sutherland
- Narrated by: Andrew Morgado
- Country of origin: United States
- Original language: English
- No. of seasons: 2
- No. of episodes: 22

Production
- Executive producers: Michael Rucker; Julie Golden; Dan Peirson; Lisa Shannon
- Production company: Shed Media

Original release
- Network: TruTV
- Release: February 4, 2021 – April 21, 2022

Fast Foodies is an American reality television series that premiered on TruTV on February 4, 2021. The series features chefs Jeremy Ford (winner of Top Chef: California), Kristen Kish (winner of Top Chef: Seattle), and Justin Sutherland (winner of an Iron Chef America episode, participant on Top Chef: Kentucky) as they attempt to re-create a celebrity guest's favorite fast food item and later make their own take on it. In May 2021, the series was renewed for a second season.

== Background ==
The idea was conceived by Shed Media producer Beau Delmore. TruTV announced the ordering of 10 episodes in October 2020. It is produced by Shed Media with Michael Rucker as an executive producer and showrunner. Julie Golden, and Shed Media's Dan Peirson and Lisa Shannon also serve as executive producers. Rucker says that the show is based on a "dirty secret of fine dining", that the chefs themselves usually just make something fast at the end of their service period when it comes to eating. Rucker also said “We didn’t want a tired series that felt one-note but something that reflected the real world, the amazing spectrum of voices in the culinary world, and was the type of kitchen that you’d actually want to hang out in.” Rucker also said that fast food typically has a memory around it, whether it be childhood nostalgia or a guilty pleasure.

The show was filmed at chef Melissa Perello's former (Note: M. Georgina opened in 2019 but only ran for four months before the COVID-19 pandemic forced it to permanently close. It is being renovated to a restaurant called Kato (restaurant) by chef Jon Yao to open in 2022.) restaurant M. Georgina in Downtown Los Angeles, California. Ford said that he got the call in 2020 after some of the restrictions from the COVID-19 pandemic were lifted.

On May 19, 2021, TruTV renewed the series for a second season. It premiered on January 27, 2022.

== Format ==
The three chefs meet a celebrity guest and are presented with that guest's favorite fast food dish.

In the first challenge, called the "copycat round", they have to replicate the dish, during which the guest interacts with the chefs and even helps prepare parts of the dish. The guest and the chefs try out each dish and the guest then picks which one is the most similar to the dish.

In the second challenge, called the "remix round", the chefs make their own take on the dish, doing something completely different from the original. The winner of the first challenge gives the other two chefs a minor "handicap", such as having to use some unintended ingredient. No time limits are imposed on the challenges.

They try out the new dishes and the guest picks a winner, who takes home the "Chompionship trophy" and some memorabilia. The losing chefs then have to take a minor punishment such as eating some nasty mix of ingredients or getting food thrown on them.

== Broadcast ==
The show premiered on TruTV on February 4, 2021. It ran on Thursdays after episodes of the ninth season of Impractical Jokers. It was also released on HBO Max in late September 2021. Fast Foodies was given a special nine-week ten-episode run starting April 13, 2023 on Food Network.

== Episodes ==
=== Series overview ===
Season	Episodes	Originally released	
Season	Episodes	First released	Last released
1	10	February 4, 2021	April 15, 2021
2	12	January 27, 2022	April 21, 2022

=== Season 1 (2021) ===
No. overall	No. in season	Guest(s)	Fast food	Winning chef	Original release date	US viewers (millions)
1	1	Joel McHale	Chicago-style hot dog from Portillo's Restaurants	Jeremy	February 4, 2021	0.248
Actor Joel McHale talks about the Chicago Red Hot that he enjoys from Portillo's. The chefs recreate the hot dog and then make their own version of the dish. The losers got shot with weiners from a t-shirt cannon.
2	2	Bobby Lee	Sausage McMuffin with Egg from McDonald's	Justin	February 11, 2021	0.244
Comedian Bobby Lee shares his favorite fast food item from McDonald's. During the copycat phase, Lee asks trivia questions about his life and tosses eggs to the chef when they answer correctly.
3	3	GaTa	Hawaiian pizza from Domino's Pizza	All three	February 18, 2021	0.201
Rapper and hype man GaTa talks about his favorite fast food pizza, and the chefs have to recreate it and give it their own remix. After GaTa pronounces all three chefs to be the winners, they try a slice of the Pizza of Pain, which is a combo of different ingredients.
4	4	James Van Der Beek	Burger and fries from In-N-Out Burger	Kristen	February 25, 2021	0.260
Former teen heartthrob actor James Van Der Beek visits the chefs and talks about the classic In-N-Out burger and fries. The losers have to smash a meat patty with their foreheads.
5	5	Amanda Seales	Cheesy Gordita Crunch from Taco Bell	Jeremy	March 4, 2021	0.255
Actress and television host Amanda Seales visits the chefs and talks about her favorite Taco Bell food item.
6	6	Ron Funches	Spicy Chicken Sandwich from Wendy's	Justin	March 11, 2021	0.209
Actor and comedian Ron Funches talks about his favorite go-to fast food item. The losers have to eat popsicles made of ingredients that should not be part of popsicles.
7	7	Kevin Heffernan & Steve Lemme	Fried chicken, mashed potatoes & gravy, kerneled corn from KFC	Kristen	March 25, 2021	0.240
Actors Kevin Hefferman and Steve Lemme known for Super Troopers and other films, as well as their TruTV series Tacoma FD, visit the chefs to try out dishes from the KFC family bucket meal.
8	8	Charlotte McKinney	All-Natural Burger from Carl's Jr	Jeremy	April 1, 2021	0.214
Model and actress Charlotte McKinney had become famous for her Carl's Jr. commercial which aired regionally during Super Bowl XLIX in 2015 where she was promoting the All-Natural Burger. Although the burger has been discontinued and McKinney doesn't really eat burgers anymore, the episode brought this back for the chefs to recreate it and give it its own take. The losers have to eat a smoothie full of burger condiments.
9	9	Andy Richter	Filet-O-Fish sandwich from McDonald's	Kristen	April 8, 2021	0.184
Talk show sidekick and comedian Andy Richter visits the chefs and talks about the Filet-O-Fish. The losers have to eat a filet-o-fish sushi and a jello shot.
10	10	Fortune Feimster	Orange chicken and fried rice from Panda Express	Kristen	April 15, 2021	0.265
Comedian and actor Fortune Feimster visits the chefs and has them cook up a copycat version of orange chicken and fried rice from Panda Express. Although Jeremy takes the longest to cook up the main dish, he wins the copycat round. During the remix round, for their mini-handicap, Kristen and Justin had to spend three minutes preparing their dishes using only chopsticks. Justin does a crispy chicken congee, Jeremy does an orange glazed sweetbreads and pork belly fried rice; and Kristen does a chicken skin with vegetable fried rice. Fortune picks Kristen as the winner; she gets a panda scooter.

=== Season 2 (2022) ===
No. overall	No. in season	Guest(s)	Fast food	Winning chef	Original release date	US viewers (millions)
11	1	Nikki Glaser	Vegan Chicken McNuggets from McDonald's	Kristen	January 27, 2022	0.229
Actor and comedian Nikki Glaser wants to enjoy Chicken McNuggets like she had in her childhood, but she has since become a vegan, so the chefs prepare vegan nuggets for the copycat round.
12	2	Chris Jericho	Momma's Pancake Breakfast from Cracker Barrel	Jeremy	February 3, 2022	0.144
Professional wrestler and Fozzy frontman Chris Jericho enjoys Momma's Pancake Breakfast from Cracker Barrel, but has poor cooking skills, so the chefs prepare a Momma's Pancake Breakfast for the copycat round.
13	3	Natasha Leggero	Sofritas burrito and chips from Chipotle Mexican Grill	Kristen	February 10, 2022	0.119
Comedian Natasha Leggero has the chefs copycat the sofritas burrito and chips from Chipotle. Natasha gives them tequila shots. Justin, whose first kitchen job was with Chipotle, easily wins the copycat round. In the remix round, Justin and Jeremy both make seafood risottos, with Justin doing one from smoked lobster/king crab and Jeremy from box crab. Kristen's build-your-own-burrito with dessert ingredients impresses Natasha for her originality. Kristen wins a bunch of Chipotle gift cards. Justin and Jeremy have to wrap themselves together in a burrito, and get lettuce thrown on them.
14	4	Jesse Tyler Ferguson	The Original Sandwich from Schlotzsky's	Kristen	February 17, 2022	0.114
Modern Family actor Jesse Tyler Ferguson has the chefs copycat the Original Sandwich from Schlotzsky's. Jeremy wins the copycat round, and has the other two mix and imbibe "drinks" while wearing goggles they can't really see clearly through. Kristen wins the remix round with a cheese and dough balls. She gets a Schlotzsky's cap. The guys have to pose between Kristen and Jesse wearing "I'm with this loser"-type shirts pointing to the guys.
15	5	Jillian Bell	Chick'n Shack chicken sandwich and crinkle-cut cheese fries from Shake Shack	Justin	February 24, 2022	0.193
Comedian Jillian Bell has the chefs recreate the Chick'n Shack chicken sandwich and crinkly cheese fries from Shake Shack. Kristen wins the copycat round. In the remix round, Jeremy and Justin have to taste cookies with random condiments in them and guess correctly what they are before resuming cooking. Justin makes a duck schnitzel, Kristen makes a spring roll, and Jeremy makes a chicken-of-the-sea tempura tuna salad. Jill picks Justin and he wins a neon sign.
16	6	Reggie Watts	Whopper and onion rings from Burger King	Justin	March 3, 2022	0.146
Comedian and musician Reggie Watts has the chefs remake the flame-broiled Whopper and onion rings from Burger King. Jeremy wins the copycat round. During the remix round, Kristen and Justin have to answer trivia questions and if they get it wrong they have to grab metal handles that deliver shocks. Kristen serves caramelized onion and cappelletti gruyere pasta; Jeremy serves smoked beef tartare with smoked beef bone marrow; Justin serves a flame-broiled panzanella salad. Reggie picks Justin for the win, and gives him a Burger King cap. The losers have to wear garbage-made hats and take a bite out of a raw onion.
17	7	Bobby Moynihan	Baconator burger from Wendy's	Justin	March 10, 2022	N/A
18	8	Baron Davis	Nachos Bellgrande from Taco Bell	Jeremy	March 24, 2022	N/A
Former NBA All-Star Baron Davis presents the Nachos Bellgrande dish from Taco Bell, which was placed inside a tank with a tarantula. Kristen wins the copycat round. In the remix round, Jeremy and Justin must either eat hot chicken wings or stand in a bucket of ice; Justin does both. Kristen makes a dish out of high-grade wagyu steak. Jeremy makes lobster with grated corn polenta. Justin makes a pozole (Mexican soup) with chicken feet. Jeremy wins the remix round and gets a framed Taco Bell "Thank You" sign. Justin and Kristen's "punishment" is to drink a smoothie that is poured through an ice sculpture of a butt.
19	9	Lucas Brothers	Pepperoni pizza and plain wings from Domino's Pizza	Kristen	March 31, 2022	N/A
20	10	Adam Pally & Jon Gabrus	McDouble burger and McChicken sandwich from McDonald's	Jeremy	April 7, 2022	N/A
21	11	Horatio Sanz	Double Cheeseburger and onion rings from White Castle	Justin	April 14, 2022	N/A
22	12	Joel McHale	Spaghetti carbonaro	All three	April 21, 2022	N/A
Joel returns except this time, he gives the chefs their toughest challenge by tasking them to put a fast food spin on an unusual dish.

== Reception ==
Zach Johnston of Uproxx liked that Fast Foodies did not have the high pressure of the cooking competitions of other reality shows: "A win isn’t going to make some upstart chef’s career or get them a corporate catering gig. The show’s highest ambition is for you to say, 'That looks tasty! And everyone is having so much fun!' " He also wrote that the show "does a great job feeling representative of our diverse nation. Everyone making the show obviously cares about unique voices and experiences, and they prove that in the simplest and most straightforward way possible: by reflecting it through the people appearing on screen." Andy Dehnart of the website Reality Blurred gave the show a B+, saying that it "is fun while it happens and kind of forgettable once it’s over. It resembles its cuisine: rich and enjoyable to consume, with some nutrition and a lot of unctuous filler."
