= Top Chef: World All-Stars =

Season 20 of American television series

- Season 20
- Hosted by: Padma Lakshmi
- Judges: Tom Colicchio; Gail Simmons
- No. of contestants: 16
- Winner: Buddha Lo
- Runners-up: Sara Bradley; Gabri Rodriguez
- Location: London, England
- Finals venue: Paris, France
- Fan Favorite: Amar Santana
- No. of episodes: 14

Release
- Original network: Bravo
- Original release: March 9 – June 8, 2023

Season chronology
- ← Previous; Houston Next → Wisconsin

Top Chef: World All-Stars is the twentieth season of the American reality television series Top Chef. Initial details about the season were released by Bravo and NBCUniversal on August 1, 2022, with filming beginning the same month. The majority of the competition was shot in London, with the season finale set in Paris, marking the first time the show had been filmed entirely abroad. The cast included past contestants from several international editions of Top Chef. Throughout the season, Padma Lakshmi, Tom Colicchio, and Gail Simmons were joined by judges from the international editions, in addition to global culinary experts. This is the last season to feature Lakshmi as host. The winner received US$250,000.

World All-Stars premiered on March 9, 2023, and concluded on June 8, 2023. In the season finale, Top Chef: Houston winner Buddha Lo was declared the victor over Top Chef: Kentucky runner-up Sara Bradley and Top Chef México Season 2 winner Gabri Rodriguez, becoming the series' first two-time champion. Top Chef: California runner-up Amar Santana was voted Fan Favorite.

== Production ==
According to Gail Simmons, the concept for Top Chef: World All-Stars had been in the works for over two years. After filming had wrapped up for the finale of Top Chef: All-Stars L.A. in Tuscany, Magical Elves Productions' executive producers and showrunner flew to Paris to meet with Bravo executives and representatives from the twenty-nine global adaptations of Top Chef. Over a two to three-day conference, the producers shared their experiences, best practices, and challenges with shooting their respective versions of the show. As a result of the meeting, Magical Elves Productions formed the idea of drawing talent from the international editions for the American series' milestone twentieth season.

Once World All-Stars was greenlit, the decision was made to move production outside of the United States to match the international theme. Several destinations were considered, including Italy, Spain, and France. Padma Lakshmi stated that London was ultimately chosen due to its abundance of different produce, meat, and ingredients, as well as its high population of immigrant cultures and ethnicities. The city also acted as neutral territory, as producers felt that filming in the US would give the American chefs an advantage against their foreign competitors. The casting team sought for diversity in the shows, countries, and cuisines the contestants would represent. They also attempted to recruit as many previous winners and runners-up as possible.

The Top Chef kitchen was built in a studio located just outside of Richmond, London. The 7,200 square foot (670 m^{2}) set was designed by production designer James Pearse Connelly, who took inspiration from British pubs, Harrods Food Hall, and Big Ben. Grocery shopping took place at a Whole Foods Market in Kensington. The production crew arrived in July 2022, staying at the Kimpton Fitzroy London Hotel, and began shooting in August. Challenge locations included Kew Gardens, Alexandra Palace, Highclere Castle, and Tottenham Hotspur Stadium. Filming for Episode 10 ("Thali Time") was notably affected by the death and state funeral of Queen Elizabeth II. According to co-executive producer Thi Nguyen, the Elimination Challenge was scheduled to take place at the Taj Hotel. However, the funeral proceedings and the hotel's close proximity to Buckingham Palace forced production to switch the challenge location back to the Top Chef kitchen on the fly. Filming for the season concluded with a two-episode finale in Paris.

== Contestants ==
World All-Stars featured 16 contestants, consisting of former winners and finalists from the American series and various other localized versions of Top Chef from around the globe. The competing chefs represented a total of 11 different iterations of the show.

Name	Hometown	Current Residence (Note: The contestants' city, state, or country of residence during time of filming.)	Original Appearance(s)	Original Placement(s)
Samuel Albert	Soucelles, France	Angers, France	Top Chef (France): Season 10	Winner
Luciana Berry	Salvador, Bahia, Brazil	London, England	(Brazil) Top Chef Brasil: Season 2	Winner
Sara Bradley	Paducah, Kentucky		(United States) Top Chef (USA): Season 16	Runner-up
Dawn Burrell	Philadelphia, Pennsylvania	Houston, Texas	(United States) Top Chef (USA): Season 18	Runner-up
Ali Ghzawi	Irbid, Jordan	Amman, Jordan	(Middle East and North Africa) Top Chef (MENA): Season 3	Winner
Tom Goetter	Mainz, Germany	Worldwide aboard Scenic ocean vessels	Top Chef Germany: Season 1	3rd
Nicole Gomes	Richmond, British Columbia	Vancouver, British Columbia	Top Chef Canada: Season 3, Season 5	5th, Winner
Victoire Gouloubi	Brazzaville, Republic of the Congo	Milan, Italy	(Italy) Top Chef Italia: Season 2	Runner-up
Charbel Hayek	Beirut, Lebanon	Lake Worth, Florida	(Middle East and North Africa) Top Chef (MENA): Season 5	Winner
Buddha Lo	Port Douglas, Australia	Brooklyn, New York	(United States) Top Chef (USA): Season 19	Winner
Dale MacKay	Saskatoon, Saskatchewan		Top Chef Canada: Season 1	Winner
Phattanant "May" Thongthong	Chiang Mai, Thailand	Bangkok, Thailand	Top Chef Thailand: Season 1	Runner-up
Begoña Rodrigo	Valencia, Spain		Top Chef (Spain): Season 1	Winner
Gabriel "Gabri" Rodriguez	Iztapalapa, Mexico City	Madrid, Spain	(Mexico) Top Chef México: Season 2	Winner
Amar Santana	Dominican Republic/Queens, New York	Santa Ana, California	(United States) Top Chef (USA): Season 13	Runner-up
Sylwia Stachyra	Lublin, Poland		Top Chef (Poland): Season 7	Winner

== Contestant progress ==
Episode #		1	2	3	4^{2}	5	6	7	8	9	10	11	12	13	14
Quickfire Challenge Winner(s)		Dale; Sara	May	N/A	Ali	Tom	Dale^{3}	Buddha	Buddha	N/A	Amar^{1}	Buddha^{1}	Buddha^{1}	Ali^{1}	N/A
Contestant		Elimination Challenge Results													
1	Buddha	IN	IN	WIN	IN	LOW	HIGH	IN	IN	WIN	LOW	WIN	WIN	HIGH	WINNER
2	Sara	IN	IN	IN	HIGH	IN	HIGH	IN	LOW	HIGH	HIGH	OUT	LOW^{4}	WIN	RUNNER-UP
2	Gabri	LOW	HIGH	HIGH	LOW	LOW	IN	IN	HIGH	LOW	LOW	WIN	HIGH	LOW	RUNNER-UP
4	Ali	IN	WIN	LOW	IN	HIGH	IN	WIN	HIGH	HIGH	HIGH	LOW	LOW	OUT	
5	Tom	HIGH	IN	IN	IN	IN	LOW	LOW	WIN	LOW	IN	LOW	OUT		
6	Amar	IN	IN	LOW	HIGH	WIN	IN	HIGH	LOW	HIGH	WIN	OUT			
7	Victoire	IN	IN	IN	HIGH	HIGH	HIGH	LOW	IN	LOW	OUT				
8	Nicole	IN	IN	IN	HIGH	IN	WIN	IN	IN	OUT					
9	Charbel	WIN	IN	IN	HIGH	IN	HIGH	HIGH	OUT						
10	Dale	IN	IN	OUT			HIGH^{3}	OUT							
11	Sylwia	IN	LOW	IN	HIGH	IN	OUT								
12	Begoña	HIGH	IN	HIGH	LOW	OUT									
13	Luciana	IN	LOW	WIN	OUT										
14	May	IN	HIGH	OUT											
15	Dawn	LOW	OUT												
16	Samuel	OUT													

^Note 1: The chef(s) did not receive immunity for winning the Quickfire Challenge.
^Note 2: Due to the tournament-style format of the Elimination Challenge in Episode 4, no formal challenge winner was determined. The winners of each round were declared safe, while the loser of the final round was eliminated.
^Note 3: Dale won the first Last Chance Kitchen re-entry challenge and returned to the competition.
^Note 4: Sara won the second Last Chance Kitchen re-entry challenge and returned to the competition.

(WINNER) The chef won the season and was crowned "Top Chef World All-Star".
(RUNNER-UP) The chef was a runner-up for the season.
(WIN) The chef won the Elimination Challenge.
(HIGH) The chef was selected as one of the top entries in the Elimination Challenge, but did not win.
(IN) The chef was not selected as one of the top or bottom entries in the Elimination Challenge and was safe.
(LOW) The chef was selected as one of the bottom entries in the Elimination Challenge, but was not eliminated.
(OUT) The chef lost the Elimination Challenge.

== Episodes ==
No. overall	No. in season	Title	Original release date	US viewers (millions)
289	1	"London Calling"	March 9, 2023	0.61
Quickfire Challenge: The chefs were first given three minutes to pick five ingredients from the Top Chef pantry, which was not stocked with any proteins. Afterwards, they were instructed to pair up and combine their pantry ingredients to cook a dish featuring UK seafood. The winners received immunity from elimination.: Winners: Dale and Sara (Langoustine with Seafood Broth & Gremolata); Elimination Challenge: The chefs were asked to create vegetable-forward dishes, where proteins served as the accompaniment. The dishes were served at the Temperate House in Kew Gardens. The guest judge was chef/director Angela Hartnett. Other diners in attendance included chef/owners Adam Handling and Brett Graham, chef patron Vineet Bhatia, and Kew Gardens botanical horticulturist Helena Dove.: Winner: Charbel (Roasted Onion, Onion Purée, Chicken Jus & Sumac Tuile); Eliminated: Samuel (Tiger Prawn Carpaccio, Prawn Head Emulsion, Vegetables & Prawn Cracker)
290	2	"Rice Rice, Baby"	March 16, 2023	0.66
Quickfire Challenge: The chefs were tasked with creating an amuse-bouche served on top of a cracker for a Ritz Crackers-sponsored challenge. First, each contestant chose one item from a display table showcasing several "unique and unexpected" ingredients, which included dragon fruit, oyster leaves, Brazil nuts, guajillo chilis, lemongrass, lotus root, plantains, yeast extract, Montenegro ash goat cheese, caviar cream, sauerkraut, wasabi, capers, fermented shrimp paste, tamarind, bottarga, hibiscus, piquillo peppers, kumquats, and jackfruit. The chefs were then split into groups of three, though they still competed individually. The group members were required to incorporate all three of their ingredients into their dishes. The judges then selected the chef with their favorite dish from each group (highlighted below in **bold**). The chef with the best overall dish from the list of favorites was declared the winner, receiving immunity from elimination and US$10,000. The guest judge was chef/owner Santiago Lastra.: Group 1: **Nicole**, Sara, Sylwia (Goat Cheese, Guajillo Chilis, Horseradish); Group 2: Amar, Begoña, **Tom** (Bottarga, Oyster Leaves, Piquillo Peppers); Group 3: Charbel, **Dale**, Luciana (Capers, Plantains, Wasabi); Group 4: Ali, **May**, Victoire (Hibiscus, Kumquats, Yeast Extract); Group 5: Buddha, Dawn, **Gabri** (Caviar Cream, Jackfruit, Tamarind); Winner: May (Spicy Kumquat Jam with Hibiscus Juice & Yeast Extract); Elimination Challenge: The chefs cooked rice dishes for the judges and 100 guests at Alexandra Palace. The guest judge was Top Chef South Africa host Lorna Maseko.: Winner: Ali (Lamb Quzi - Smoked Rice, Toasted Nuts, Minted Cucumber & Yogurt); Eliminated: Dawn (Black Venus Congee with Black Bean & Five-Spice Braised Oxtail)
291	3	"Cheeky Pints and Pub Bites"	March 23, 2023	0.66
Elimination Challenge: The chefs were taken on a pub crawl around central London to sample beers and classic pub food, which included fish and chips, fisherman's pie, and Sunday roast at the Lamb & Flag; shepherd's pie, steak and ale pie, and toad in the hole at the Jack Horner; and bangers and mash and Scotch eggs at Trafalgar Tavern. They were then divided into teams of two. Each pair was responsible for reinterpreting and/or modernizing one of the aforementioned pub dishes, which were served to the judges and 40 other pubgoers at Trafalgar Tavern. Both members of the losing team were eliminated. The guest judges were chef/owners Brett Graham and James Cochran.: Winners: Buddha and Luciana (Cod with Seafood & Potatoes, Pomme Purée, Mussels & Champagne Sauce); Eliminated: Dale and May (Thai-Style Scotch Egg with Thai Sausage, Crispy Salad, Cilantro Aioli & Thai Fish Sauce Dressing)
292	4	"Spurred Lines"	March 30, 2023	0.52
Question Challenge: The chefs baked two kinds of biscuits, one sweet and one savory. The winner received immunity from elimination. The guest judge was master chocolatier Paul A. Young.: Winner: Ali (Savory: Za'atar Biscuit; Sweet: Orange Sablé); Elimination Challenge: The chefs competed in a football-themed tournament-style team challenge set at Tottenham Hotspur Stadium. The winners of each round in the tournament (voted upon by Colicchio, Lakshmi, Simmons, Top Chef México judge Aquiles Chávez, and Tottenham Hotspur club ambassador Ledley King) were declared safe from elimination. In the first round, two teams competed head-to-head by cooking dishes featuring Stilton cheese, while the other two teams faced off with dishes featuring Wensleydale cheese. The two losing, or "relegated", teams from the first round were then asked to create dishes featuring Bramley apples for the second round. The members of the relegated team from the second round then competed against each other in the third and final round, making dishes featuring English peas. The loser of the third round was eliminated from the competition.: Maroon Team: Amar, Nicole, Victoire; Green Team: Begoña, Gabri, Luciana; Yellow Team: Ali, Buddha, Tom; Purple Team: Charbel, Sara, Sylwia; Round 1 (Cheese); **Maroon Team** | **5** Green Team | 0 Yellow Team | 1; **Purple Team** | **4** Round 2 (Apples); Green Team | 0; **Yellow Team** | **5**: Round 3 (Peas); Begoña / ✓; Gabri / ✓; Luciana / ✗; Eliminated: Luciana (Scallop Carpaccio with Yakiniku Sauce & Pea Velouté)
293	5	"Holiday Vacation"	April 6, 2023	0.62
Quickfire Challenge: The chefs created celebratory dishes featuring mead and honey. The winner received immunity from elimination. The guest judge was chef/owner Adam Handling.: Winner: Tom (Pine Honeyed Duck with Honey Caviar); Elimination Challenge: The chefs served a family-style dinner at a vacation home in the Kent countryside for a Vrbo-sponsored challenge. The dishes needed to be inspired by the chefs' favorite holiday meals. The contestants cooked in the vacation home's kitchen, limiting their space and equipment. They also shared a collective shopping budget of £1,000. The winner received a complimentary stay, worth US$10,000, at any Vrbo vacation home around the world. The guest judge was Top Chef México judge Martha Ortiz.: Winner: Amar (Braised Lamb Shank with Prunes, Cinnamon, Sweet Onions & Toasted Almonds); Eliminated: Begoña ("Leftover" Stew with Chicken, Vegetables & Peanut Sauce)
294	6	"Top Chef Is No Picnic"	April 13, 2023	0.57
Quickfire Challenge: The chefs judged the first Last Chance Kitchen re-entry challenge alongside Colicchio and Lakshmi. The two current Last Chance Kitchen competitors, Dale and Begoña, were given one hour to create six afternoon tea towers, consisting of finger sandwiches, scones, and pastries. After a blind tasting, Colicchio, Lakshmi, and the non-eliminated chefs voted for their favorite tea tower (the non-eliminated chefs counted as one collective vote, decided by majority). The contestant who garnered the most votes returned to the main competition and received immunity, while the loser was eliminated from Last Chance Kitchen.: Winner: Dale (Smoked Salmon & Egg Salad Sandwich; Bacon & Chive Scone with Gruyère Cheese; Ginger Cake with Mango Compote); Eliminated: Begoña (Crab & Seaweed Sandwich; Chocolate Éclair with Whipped Cream); Elimination Challenge: The chefs, separated into two teams, prepared gourmet baskets for a picnic at Highclere Castle. Each picnic basket had to contain five dishes, including one dessert. The chefs shopped for specialty items at Fortnum & Mason before their usual trip to Whole Foods Market. After the teams' cooking time expired, the dishes were packed and sat overnight in the Top Chef kitchen. The meals were then transported to the castle grounds the next day. The food needed to be ready-to-serve, as the chefs would not have access to another kitchen. The winner received US$10,000. The two contestants with the judges' least favorite dishes then competed against each other in a sudden death cook-off. The guest judge was chef/owner Graham Hornigold. Other diners in attendance included chef/owner Harriet Mansell, head chef Stu Deeley, executive pastry chef Roger Pizey, and author Max Halley.: Blue Team: Buddha, Charbel, Dale, Nicole, Sara, Victoire; Yellow Team: Ali, Amar, Gabri, Sylwia, Tom; Winner: Nicole (Salmon Niçoise Salad); NOTE: The results of the sudden death cook-off were aired in Episode 5 of Last Chance Kitchen.
295	7	"Hands Off"	April 20, 2023	0.67
Quickfire Challenge: The chefs made dishes inspired by emojis. The winner received immunity from elimination. The guest judge was "food rebel" Gaggan Anand.: Winner: Buddha ("Freezing Myself to Death" - Frozen Coconut Water, Coconut Cream & Coconut Sorbet with Damson Plum & Candied Ginger); Elimination Challenge: The chefs tasted one of Anand's creations, "Rainbow World", a paste of jasmine cream shaped into a world map and dusted with assorted dried fruits and edible flowers to create a rainbow of color representing love and unity. The chefs were then challenged to create their own visually stunning dish that sent a message and could be eaten without utensils.: Winner: Ali (Mushroom Kubbeh, Chickpea Mousse & Pickled Grape Leaves); Eliminated: Dale (Roasted Chicken Thigh with Corn Custard, Mole, Pineapple, Pickled Jalapeño & Nuts)
296	8	"Street Food Fight"	April 27, 2023	0.55
Quickfire Challenge: The chefs put their own spin on classic international street food. The winner received immunity from elimination. The guest judge was chef/owner Judy Joo.: Winner: Buddha (Vietnam - Bánh Xèo with Pork, Shrimp, Bean Sprouts & Coriander); Elimination Challenge: The chefs, in teams of three, participated in a high-speed mise en place relay race for a Fast X-sponsored challenge. The race was broken down into three rounds, each featuring three ingredients inspired by the settings for the Fast & Furious films. The first team to finish all their mise en place tasks was given first choice of the round's three ingredients, with the second team getting second choice, and the last team receiving whatever was leftover. After the race was completed, the teams were given 30 minutes to present the judges with three different dishes featuring their prepped ingredients. While the judges declared an individual winner, each member of the winning team received a trip with a guest to the world premiere of Fast X. The guest judge was Top Chef Canada judge David Zilber.: Red Team: Buddha, Nicole, Victoire; Green Team: Amar, Charbel, Sara; Yellow Team: Ali, Gabri, Tom; Round 1: Pit and fan four avocados (The Fast and the Furious - Los Angeles); Supreme eight oranges (2 Fast 2 Furious - Miami); Filet two hamachi (The Fast and the Furious: Tokyo Drift - Tokyo); Round 2: Peel and dice eight prickly pears (Fast & Furious - Mexico); Clean and devein twenty-four shrimp (Fast Five - Rio de Janeiro); Shell one cup of peas (Fast & Furious 6 - London); Round 3: Pit two quarts of dates (Furious 7 - Abu Dhabi); Brunoise half a cup of peppers (The Fate of the Furious - Cuba); French two racks of lamb (F9 - Scotland); Winner: Tom (Roasted Bell Pepper with Smoked Bell Pepper & Hazelnut Purée, Chorizo Gremolata, Feta Cheese & Pickled Veggies); Eliminated: Charbel (Seared Lamb Loin, Carrot Dijonnaise Purée & Roasted Carrots with Honey Glaze)
297	9	"Restaurant Wars"	May 4, 2023	0.63
Elimination Challenge: The chefs competed in Restaurant Wars, with chef patron Clare Smyth serving as a guest judge. Instead of having to build a pop-up restaurant from scratch, the two teams served their meals at Smyth's three Michelin star restaurant, Core by Clare Smyth. The contestants were also provided with a professional restaurant director and wait staff to help run their service, meaning they were not responsible for front-of-house duties. The teams had to create tasting menus featuring at least four courses for the judging panel and 50 guests, including food critic and secret guest judge Jimi Famurewa, who had been inserted into the regular crowd without the chefs' knowledge. While the judges declared an individual winner, each member of the winning team received US$10,000.: Root: Gabri, Nicole, Tom, Victoire; First Course: The Leek & The Chestnut - Confit Leek with Leek Velouté & Black Garlic Chestnut Purée (Tom); Second Course: Shellfish Tortellini - Lobster, King Prawn & Vermouth Beurre Blanc (Nicole); Third Course: Poached Sea Bream with Black Huatape & Trout Caviar (Gabri); Palate Cleanser: Grapefruit & Citrus Sorbet (Gabri); Fourth Course: Tiramisu My Way - Rice Flour Cake with Mascarpone & Plantain Cream (Victoire); United Kitchen: Ali, Amar, Buddha, Sara; First Course: Full English - Coddled Egg, Black Pudding, Truffle Toast & Tomato Tea (Buddha); Second Course: Scallop Tartare with Vadouvan & Pickled Vegetables (Amar); Third Course: Cullen Skink - Leek Wrapped Cod, Potato & Smoked Onion (Sara); Fourth Course: Lamb Loin with Freekeh & Apricots / Cornish Pasty - Braised Lamb Wrapped in Filo Dough (Ali); Fifth Course: Strawberries & Cream - Basil Ice Cream, Strawberry Jam, Milk Gel & Inverted Meringue (Buddha); Winning Team: United Kitchen; Winner: Buddha; Eliminated: Nicole
298	10	"Thali Time"	May 11, 2023	0.53
Quickfire Challenge: The chefs made dishes using preserved seafood, such as kippers, bloaters, mojama, katsuobushi, and smoked prawns. The winner received an advantage in the Elimination Challenge. Beginning with this Quickfire Challenge, immunity from elimination was no longer available as a reward. The guest judge was chef/owner Tom Brown.: Winner: Amar (Smoked Haddock Salad with Cucumber, Potato, Smoked Scallop & Roasted Pepper Emulsion); Elimination Challenge: The chefs created Indian-style thalis. The thalis were required to include rice and side dishes encompassing six flavor profiles: sweet, salty, sour, bitter, heat, and pungent. As the winner of the Quickfire Challenge, Amar received an extra 30 minutes of cooking time. The guest judge was restaurateur/cookbook author Asma Khan. Other diners in attendance included executive chef Sujoy Gupta, chef/author Vivek Singh, and chef/director of operations Sriram Aylur.: Winner: Amar (Pungent/Bitter - Lentils with Fenugreek; Sweet - Stone Fruit Chutney; Heat - Shrimp & Crab Curry; Sour - Green Mango Raita; Salty - Basmati Rice with Nigella Seeds; Bitter - Tandoori Sweetbreads); Eliminated: Victoire (Salty - Rice with Saffron; Heat - Lamb with Coriander; Sweet - Yogurt with Mango; Pungent - Onion & Cucumber Salad with Coriander; Bitter - Okra with Moringa; Sour - Red Lentil Dal)
299	11	"Battle of the Wellingtons"	May 18, 2023	0.64
Quickfire Challenge: The chefs competed in a Finish-sponsored water conservation-themed challenge. The contestants were asked to make steamed dishes; however, they were only provided one gallon of water to share amongst themselves. The winner received US$10,000. A $10,000 charitable donation was also made by Finish on the winner's behalf towards the World Wildlife Fund for river conservation initiatives. The guest judge was chef Andrew Wong.: Winner: Buddha (Seafood Hotpot with Black Vinegar & Shaoxing Sauce); Elimination Challenge: The chefs, working in pairs, were tasked with creating three different kinds of Wellington: one seafood, one meat, and one dessert. The dishes were served at Tobacco Dock for the judges and 25 guest diners. The diners voted for their favorite dishes for each round, which was taken into consideration during judging. Both members of the losing team were eliminated. The guest judge was executive chef Kirk Westaway.: Red Team: Amar, Sara; Green Team: Buddha, Gabri; Yellow Team: Ali, Tom; Winners: Buddha and Gabri (Salmon Wellington with Shrimp Pâté, Beurre Blanc with Salmon Caviar & Robuchon Potato Purée; Dry-Aged Beef Wellington with Truffle Demi-Glace, Pickled Beetroot & Foie Gras; Peach Melba Wellington with Almond Frangipane, Raspberry Sorbet & Tonka Bean Crème Anglaise); Eliminated: Amar and Sara (Tuna & Seafood Wellington with Asparagus Purée & Sauce Américaine; Harissa-Rubbed Lamb Wellington with Date & Garlic Black Purée; Apple Pie Tres Leches Wellington with Apple Purée & Spiced Crème Anglaise)
300	12	"Goodbye, London!"	May 25, 2023	0.73
Quickfire Challenge: The chefs had to use a mold to create desserts incorporating gelatin. The winner received an advantage in the Elimination Challenge. Following the final episode of Last Chance Kitchen, Sara rejoined the competition. The guest judge was director Sam Bompas.: Winner: Buddha ("Orange Blossom" - Saffron Ice Cream with Orange Blossom Jelly & Panna Cotta); Elimination Challenge: The chefs created dishes with a trompe-l'œil motif (i.e. dishes that trick the eye and taste different than what they resemble). As the winner of the Quickfire Challenge, Buddha received an extra 30 minutes of cooking time. The dishes were served at Hatfield House. The guest judge was chef/co-owner Jeremy Chan. Other diners in attendance included chef/director Tommy Banks and chef/owners Yuma Hashemi and Rafael Cagali.: Winner: Buddha ("What's for Dinner?" - Beef & Onion "Red Wine", Bread "Porcini", Polpette "Cherries" & Potato Croquette "Black Truffle"); Eliminated: Tom (Seaweed & Fish Stock Caviar, Almond Cream & Seaweed Salad)
301	13	"Champions in Paris"	June 1, 2023	0.64
Quickfire Challenge: The chefs were flown to Paris for the final rounds of the competition. They had to cook a dish while simultaneously giving instructions to a mystery partner, hidden behind a partition, on how to cook the same exact dish. The contestants were judged based on how closely both dishes resembled each other in terms of taste and presentation. Ali was paired with Paralympic swimmer Mallory Weggemann; Buddha was paired with Paralympic track and field athlete Hunter Woodhall; Gabri was paired with Olympic gymnast Suni Lee; and Sara was paired with Olympic hurdler and sprinter Sydney McLaughlin-Levrone. The winner received a US$10,000 gift card from Delta Air Lines. The guest judge was chef/owner Greg Marchand.: Winner: Ali (Potato Leek Soup with Crème Fraîche); Elimination Challenge: The chefs made elevated dishes highlighting Champignon de Paris (button mushrooms). The dishes were prepared on the Ducasse sur Seine, a fine dining tour boat owned by chef Alain Ducasse, and served to a table of Michelin star chefs, including Mauro Colagreco, Adeline Grattard, Alexandre Mazzia, Louis-Philippe Vigilant, Alessandra Del Favero, and guest judge Greg Marchand.: Winner: Sara (Mushrooms, Beef Leg Marmalade, Pears & Pickled Mushrooms); Eliminated: Ali (Mushroom Steak, Mushroom Croquette with Za'atar & Goat Cheese, Mushroom Jus & Pickled Mushrooms)
302	14	"Fin."	June 8, 2023	0.68
Elimination Challenge: The chefs had to cook the best four-course progressive meal of their lives. Each finalist received help from one sous-chef, consisting of previously eliminated competitors Ali, Tom, and Amar. Buddha was assisted by Ali, Gabri was assisted by Tom, and Sara was assisted by Amar. The meals were served at Pavillon Ledoyen. The guest judge was Top Chef France judge Hélène Darroze. Other diners in attendance included Food & Wine editor-in-chief Hunter Lewis, Michelin Guide international director Gwendal Poullennec, Top Chef Masters winner Marcus Samuelsson, chef patron Clare Smyth, and chef/owners Daniela Soto-Innes, May Chow, Simon Rogan, and Ángel León.: Buddha: First Course: Rainbow Trout, Potato, Celery with Caviar, Clam Velouté & Butterfly Oyster Cracker; Second Course: Red Curry Bisque with Blue Lobster, Pickled Squash Salad & Ravioli Dumpling; Third Course: Lamb with Eggplant, Pickled Onions & Lo Shui; Fourth Course: Lamington with Raspberries, Coconut Bavarois & Raspberry Jam; Gabri: First Course: Sweet Corn Esquites with Grasshoppers Tostada, Corn Mushrooms & Lemon Hollandaise; Second Course: Sweet Potato Empanada with Black Bean Filling & Cheese Foam; Third Course: "Chiles en Nogada" - Ground Beef Sausage & Dehydrated Fruit Filled Poblano Pepper with Sauce of Nuts; Fourth Course: Chocolate Tamale with Hazelnut Filling, Hazelnut & Goat Cheese Ice Cream; Sara: First Course: Seafood Couvillion with Tomato Water; Second Course: Veal Liver & Onions with Cookie Butter & Figs; Third Course: Burgoo with Roulade of Rabbit Loin, Boudin Blanc & Crépinette with Cornbread Madeline; Fourth Course: English Pea Cake with Pistachio Butter, Lemon Curd & Buttermilk Sorbet; Winner: Buddha; Runners-up: Gabri and Sara

== Last Chance Kitchen ==
No.	Title	Original air date
1	"When Titans Fall"	March 16, 2023
Challenge: The chefs were provided with the ingredients from their most memorable season finale dish. They then had 30 minutes to use the same ingredients to create a new dish reflecting who they were now as a chef.: Samuel: Grilled Salmon with Mushroom Cream, Mushrooms & Pine Nut Vinaigrette; Dawn: Pan Roasted Lamb Saddle with Shito Tomato Salad & Herb Bread Crumbs; Winner: Dawn; Eliminated: Samuel
2	"Welsh Toast Twist"	March 23, 2023
Challenge: The chefs were given 30 minutes to make their own version of Welsh rarebit. Two contestants advanced to the next round. Gail Simmons joined Colicchio as a guest judge.: Dawn: Rarebit with Kimchi & Cheddar Cream; Dale: Rarebit with Cream Cheese, Asparagus, Roasted Mushrooms, Red Wine Mustard Shallot Reduction & Chives; May: Rarebit with Beer Foam, Port Wine Chili Lillies & Tomato; Winner: Dale; Eliminated: Dawn
3	"Get Jumping!"	March 30, 2023
Challenge: The chefs were given 30 minutes to create dishes incorporating cheese, apples, peas, and rabbit. Two contestants advanced to the next round.: Dale: Roasted Rabbit Loin & Kidneys with Feta & Apple Espuma, Peas; May: Rabbit Loin Roulade with Ricotta & Mascarpone Cheese, Apples & Peas; Luciana: Rabbit Loin with Miso & Sake Sauce, Mashed Peas, Mascarpone & Glazed Apples; Winner: Luciana; Eliminated: May
4	"Cohesive Chaos"	April 6, 2023
Challenge: The chefs were given 30 minutes to create a three-course meal, consisting of a crunchy dish, a chewy dish, and a creamy dish. Two contestants advanced to the next round.: Dale: Creamy - Mascarpone & Lemon Curd Sabayon, Macerated Strawberries, Meringue, Basil & Cilantro; Luciana: Crunchy - Crispy Skin & Chopped Squab, Casaba with Parsley & Marsala Reduction; Begoña: Chewy - Squab with Crispy Skin, Confit Mushrooms & Madeira Reduction; Winner: Begoña; Eliminated: Luciana; NOTE: Following this episode, the first Last Chance Kitchen re-entry challenge took place, which aired as the Quickfire Challenge in Episode 6 of the main series.
5	"Earl of Sandwich"	April 13, 2023
Challenge: The chefs with the judges' least favorite dishes from the main series' sixth Elimination Challenge, Tom and Sylwia, were given 20 minutes to prepare elevated sandwiches. The sandwiches needed to include at least one cooked component. The winner was safe from elimination, while the loser entered Last Chance Kitchen. The guest judge was author Max Halley.: Tom: Beef Filet Sandwich with Spicy Tomato Marmalade; Sylwia: Crab Sandwich with 'Nduja Champagne Hollandaise Spread; Winner: Tom; Eliminated: Sylwia
6	"Omelet You Win"	April 20, 2023
Challenge: The chefs were given 15 minutes to put their own spin on an omelette.: Sylwia: "Omelette Arnold Bennett" - Eggs with Smoked Salmon, Truffles, Hollandaise Sauce & Chives; Dale: Traditional Omelette with Chives, Mushrooms & Brown Butter Spinach Purée; Winner: Dale; Eliminated: Sylwia
7	"You Say Tomato"	April 27, 2023
Challenge: The chefs were given 30 minutes to showcase tomatoes cooked in at least three different ways.: Dale: Tomato 3-Ways - Tomato Butter Sauce, Stewed Tomato Compote & Roasted Semi-Dry Tomatoes with Sea Bass; Charbel: Tomato 4-Ways - Tomato Concassé, Blanched-Marinated Tomatoes & Tomato Vinaigrette; Winner: Charbel; Eliminated: Dale
8	"Who Ya Rooting For?"	May 4, 2023
Challenge: The chefs were given 45 minutes to cook pasta dishes using root vegetables.: Charbel: Ravioli Stuffed Parsnip with Brown Butter Sage & Toasted Pumpkin Seeds; Nicole: Parisian Gnocchi with Jerusalem Artichoke, Bacon & Leek Fondue; Winner: Charbel; Eliminated: Nicole
9	"Salty, Sweet & Bitter Oh My!"	May 11, 2023
Challenge: The chefs were given 30 minutes to prepare dishes highlighting three of the six Ayurveda taste profiles: sweet, sour, salty, bitter, pungent, and astringent.: Charbel: Salty, Sour & Pungent - Chilean Sea Bass with Spicy Spinach, Sautéed Mushrooms & Citrus Relish; Victoire: Sweet, Bitter & Astringent - Radicchio Trevisano Confit with Red Onion & Fruit Reduction; Winner: Charbel; Eliminated: Victoire
10	"What a Grind!"	May 18, 2023
Challenge: The chefs were given 45 minutes to cook their versions of a meat pie utilizing two different proteins. In addition, the contestants either had to chop their proteins manually or grind their proteins with a hand-cranked meat grinder.: Charbel: Beef & Lobster Pie with Beef Jus; Amar: Shrimp & Duck Heart Pot Pie; Sara: Gumbo Pot Pie with Kielbasa & Shrimp; Winner: Sara; Eliminated: Amar
11	"Last Chance Kitchen Finale"	May 18, 2023
Challenge: The chefs were given one hour to create three dishes, each matching a specific theme. For the first dish, they had to improve upon their worst dish of the season. For the second dish, they had to put their own spin on the best thing they ate all season. For the third dish, they had to illustrate their experiences from their time in the UK and their growth as a chef. Each finalist was able to select two previously eliminated Last Chance Kitchen competitors to act as their sous chefs. Sara chose Nicole and Sylwia, and Charbel chose Amar and Dale. The winner returned to the main competition. Gail Simmons and Victoire joined Colicchio as guest judges.: Charbel: First Dish: Salmon with Mushroom & Zucchini; Second Dish: Roasted Onion with Pomegranate Molasses Purée, Chicken Jus & Chicken Skin; Third Dish: Date & Honey Compote with Passionfruit & Berries; Sara: First Dish: Cured & Burnt Cabbage with Apple Purée & Bacon Jus; Second Dish: Elevated Fish & Chips - Cod Wrapped in Prosciutto, Pea Purée & Potato Croquette; Third Dish: Salmon with Green Harissa Succotash; Winner: Sara; Eliminated: Charbel
