= Amar Santana =

Dominican-American chef

- Born: May 13, 1982 (age 44); Dominican Republic
- Culinary career
- Current restaurant(s): Broadway by Amar Santana Vaca
- Previous restaurant: The Hall Global Eatery
- Television show(s): Top Chef: California Top Chef: World All-Stars

Amar Santana (born May 13, 1982) is a Dominican-American chef and television personality. He is known as being a two-time contestant on the reality television show Top Chef.

== Early life ==
Santana was born in the Dominican Republic and immigrated to the United States at age 13. He lived in East Elmhurst, Queens. After taking part in the Careers through Culinary Arts Program at Long Island City High School, he earned a scholarship to the Culinary Institute of America.

== Career ==
Santana studied and worked under chef Charlie Palmer for 10 years. Santana opened the restaurant Broadway By Amar Santana in 2011 in Laguna Beach, followed by Vaca in Costa Mesa in 2015.

In 2013, Santana defeated chef Mirko Pademo in an episode of Knife Fight. In 2015, he was featured on Top Chef: California. He came in second place behind Jeremy Ford. In January 2020, Santana opened The Hall Global Eatery at the South Coast Plaza. It had closed by the end of 2021.

Santana was invited to be a guest judge on Top Chef: Portland. In 2023, he returned as a contestant on Top Chef: World All-Stars. He was eliminated in episode 11 alongside Sara Bradley.
