= Willie Sims (basketball) =

American-Israeli basketball player (1958–2022)

Willie Sims וילי סימס
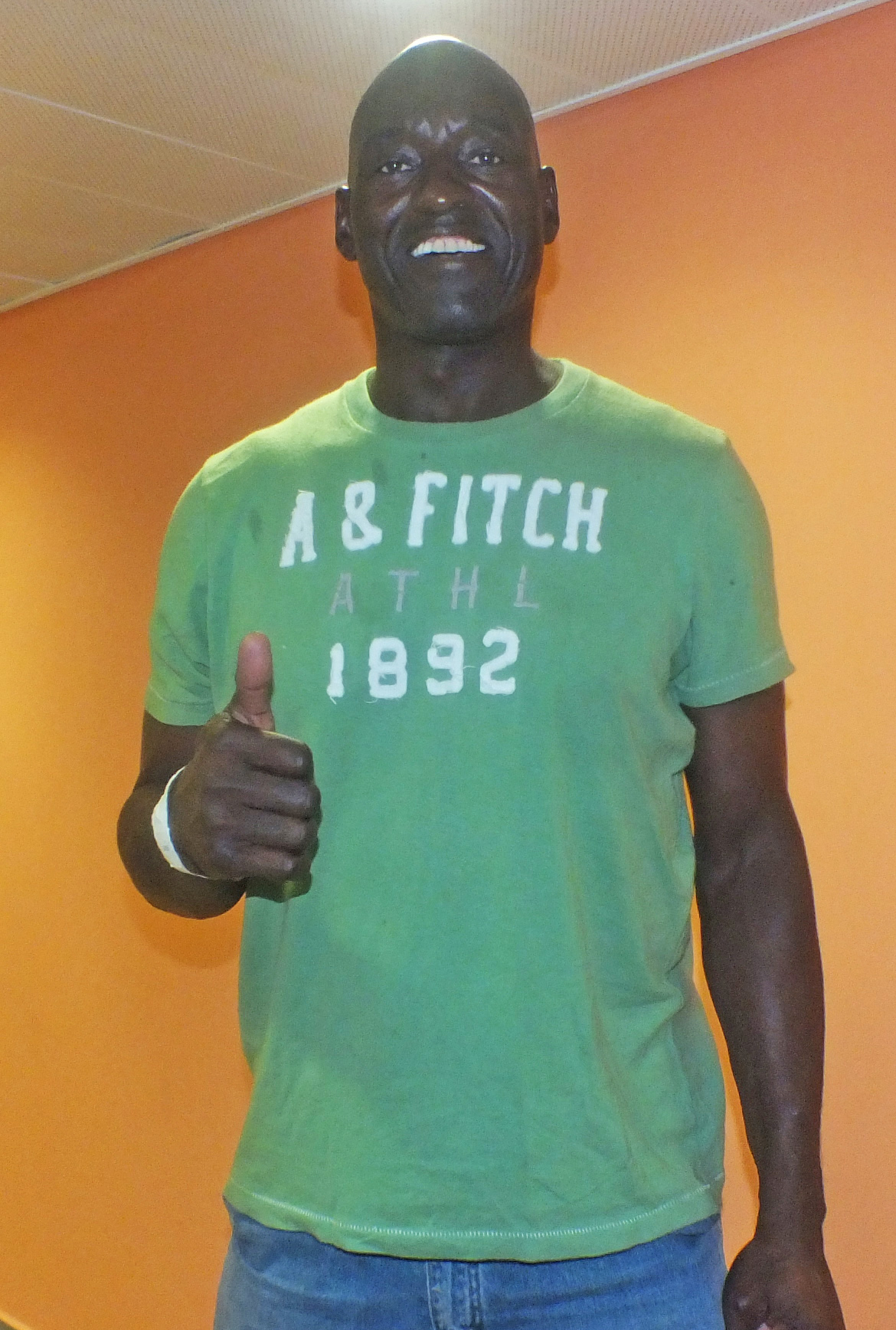
- Sims in 2013

Personal information
- Born: June 16, 1958 Lanett, Alabama, U.S.
- Died: December 23, 2022 (aged 64) Israel
- Listed height: 6 ft 3 in (1.91 m)
- Listed weight: 195 lb (88 kg)

Career information
- High school: Long Island City (Long Island City, New York)
- College: LSU (1977–1981)
- NBA draft: 1981: 5th round, 101st overall pick
- Drafted by: Denver Nuggets
- Playing career: 1981–1999
- Position: Shooting guard

Career history
- 1981–1983: Maccabi Haifa
- 1983–1985: Hapoel Tel Aviv
- 1985–1987: Elitzur Netanya
- 1987–1992: Maccabi Tel Aviv
- 1992–1996: Hapoel Eilat
- 1998–1999: Maccabi Hadera

Career highlights
- Third-team Parade All-American (1977)
- Stats at Basketball Reference
Medals
Maccabiah Games
Gold medal – first place	1977 Israel	Men's basketball
Gold medal – first place	1981 Israel	Men's basketball

Willie Sims (Hebrew: וילי סימס; June 16, 1958 – December 23, 2022) was an American-Israeli professional basketball player. He played college basketball for the LSU Tigers and professionally for a number of Israeli Basketball Premier League clubs.

== Early life ==
Sims was born in Lanett, Alabama and grew up in New York City, New York. He was Jewish, and was predominantly raised by his grandmother who was a convert to Judaism following her marriage to Sims' grandfather, Jack Miller.

Sims played high school basketball at Long Island City High School and college basketball at Louisiana State University from 1977 until 1981. Sims was drafted in 1981 by the NBA's Denver Nuggets in the fifth round of that year's NBA draft, but he never played in the NBA or in any other league in North America.

Sims, an American, played basketball in Israel for Maccabi Haifa B.C. from 1981 to 1983. From 1983 to 1985 he played for Hapoel Tel Aviv B.C., where he won the Israeli Basketball State Cup. From 1985 until 1987 he played for Elitzur Netanya. From 1987 to 1992 he played for Maccabi Tel Aviv B.C., where he won the Israeli Basketball Super League five times, won three Israeli State Cups, and became one of the club's most famous players. He was with Hapoel Eilat B.C. from 1992 until 1996.

Sims then retired from active basketball. He became a coach. He came back as an active player for Maccabi Hadera of the Liga Leumit during the 1998–99 season, but retired for good after that season.

== International career ==
Sims took part in the 10th 1977 Maccabiah Games as part of the United States national basketball team. He scored the winning shot against Israel in the finals and helped the United States to the title. He also played in the 11th Maccabiah Games, again representing the United States.

== Personal life ==
Sims married his wife in Cyprus. He had a daughter, Danielle Sims, who is married to Gal Mekel.

Sims died from complications of a heart attack in Israel, on December 23, 2022, at the age of 64.
