= Long Island City High School =

Public school in New York City

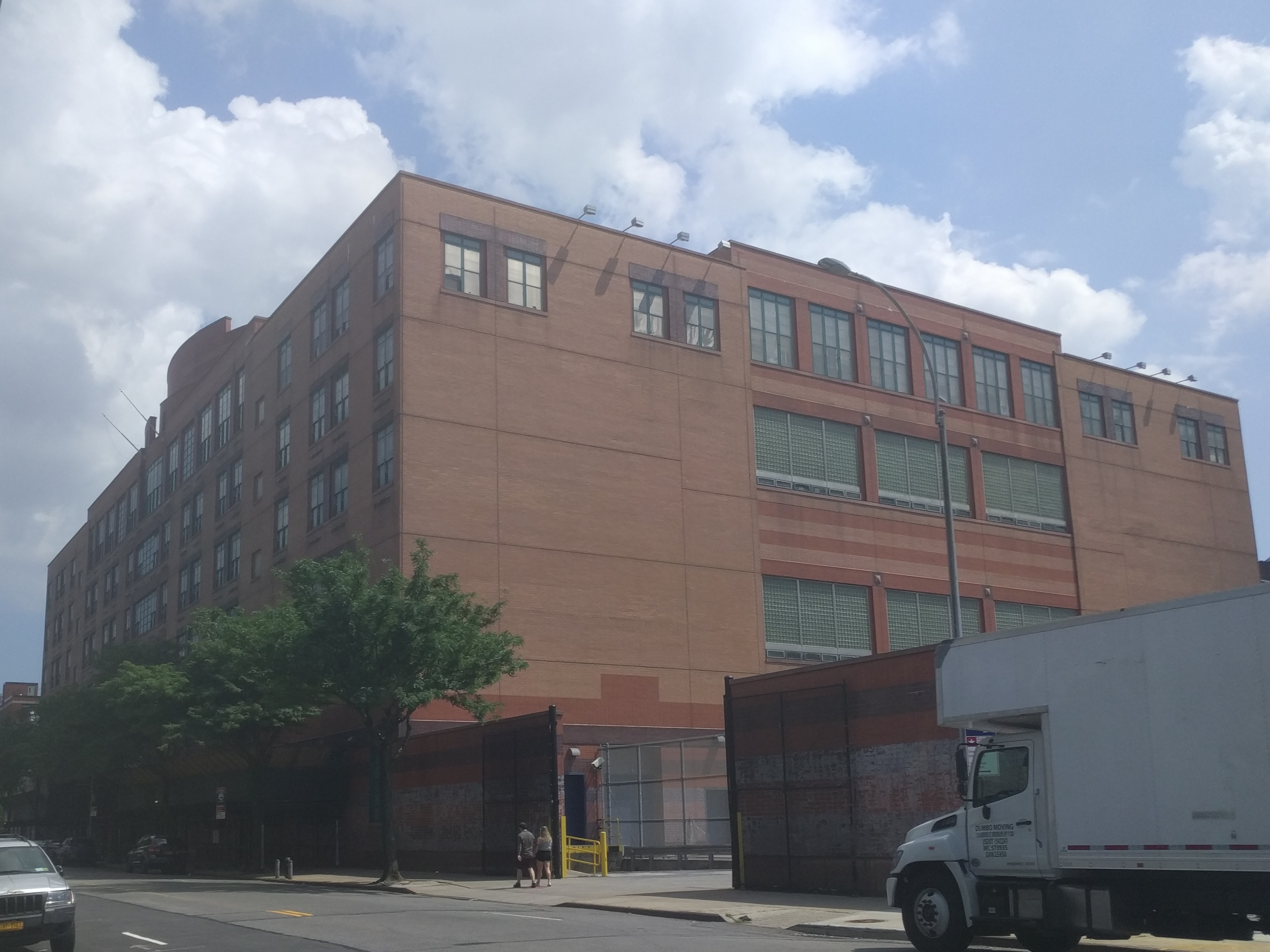

Location
- 14-30 Broadway; Long Island City, New York; United States
- 40.765809°N 73.933052°W

Information
- Type: Public
- Motto: Enhancing Education Through Technology
- Established: 1927; 99 years ago
- School board: New York City Public Schools
- School district: 30
- School number: Q450
- Principal: Vivian Selenikas
- Grades: 9–12
- Enrollment: 3,126
- Mascot: Bulldog
- Website: www.lichs-bulldogs.org

Long Island City High School, commonly abbreviated L.I.C. or LICHS, is a public high school in Long Island City, Queens, New York City. The present building was built in 1995. The school had an enrollment of around 2,500 in 2015.

== Demographics ==
As of the 2013–2014 school year, Long Island City High School was 62% Hispanic/Latino, 15% Asian, 12% black and 10% white.

== Background ==
The school, which serves grades 9 through 12, is a part of the New York City Department of Education, and has an overall 59% graduation rate which includes special education students and ESL (English as a Second Language) students. The highest graduation rates in the past few years have been the class of 2010 with 70% and the class of 2011 with 89%.

Long Island City High School has a significant population of first-generation immigrants as students.

The school also has courses in music and culinary arts. The Music department consist of various levels of strings, orchestra, band, and choir. The orchestra, band and choir have all been recognized by NYSSMA, the New York State Music Association, as well as individual students in classes such as Opera and strings. The Celebrity Chef Bobby Flay has visited this school to shoot his show Throwdown with Bobby Flay. Each year, culinary program graduates win thousands of dollars in scholarships to well-known culinary academies like CIA. The PSAL organization recently refurbished the football field, which is used by teams all over the city for everything from Lacrosse to Soccer to Football The field has recently undergone a major renovation, in part due to the generosity of PSAL and the New York Jets. LICHS Gymnastics teams have won several citywide championships, the most recent being in the 2013 and 2014 school years. Alumni have attended Ivy League schools, as well as State University of New York, City University of New York, and parochial post-secondary institutions.

The former principal, William Bassell, has opened the new LIC building, replacing the original building on 41st Avenue and 28th Street (see Newcomer High School) which has 2 large gyms, a dance studio, a custom made culinary cooking kitchen for cooking classes, and an Olympic sized swimming pool. The current principal, Vivian Selenikas, was a network leader for the NYCDOE before returning to LICHS, where she had been an assistant principal years before.

Long Island City High School has over a dozen AP Classes, Opera and Orchestra, Dance and Theater, Visual Arts, and over eight Foreign Languages. It also has over 20 multicultural and interdisciplinary clubs, over 20 sports teams and a growing ARISTA (National Honor Society) chapter. The gymnastics program has won multiple citywide championships. Graduates have won football and baseball scholarships, as well as invitations to join major league baseball.

== Army Junior Reserve Officers' Training Corp. ==
The High School includes an Army Junior Reserve Officers' Training Corps Program (JROTC).

The BullDog Battalion, JROTC Program, was first established in 2002. The School's Army JROTC, "Bulldog Battalion" drill team, Sons of Liberty & Daughters of Liberty, are both National High School level Champions in the National High School Drill Team Championships. The JROTC was able to achieve an honor unit with distinction award and has since held that achievement.

The Drill Team has been invited to many events such as, escorting Mayor Bloomberg during his term and Color Guard for New York Giants football games in the past. The most notable event they participated in was in 2008. The Sons of Liberty & Daughters of Liberty drill teams, both teams were chosen over every school in the nation by Ashanti to perform with her and Ja Rule on Good Morning America.

== Notable alumni ==
- Al Bianchi (1950), former NBA basketball coach
- Michael N. Gianaris (1988), Democrat NY State Senator
- George Onorato (1946), former Democratic New York State Senator
- Amar Santana, Dominican-American chef and television personality
- Willie Sims (born 1958), American-Israeli basketball player
