= Stubborn Seed =

Restaurant in Miami, Florida, U.S.

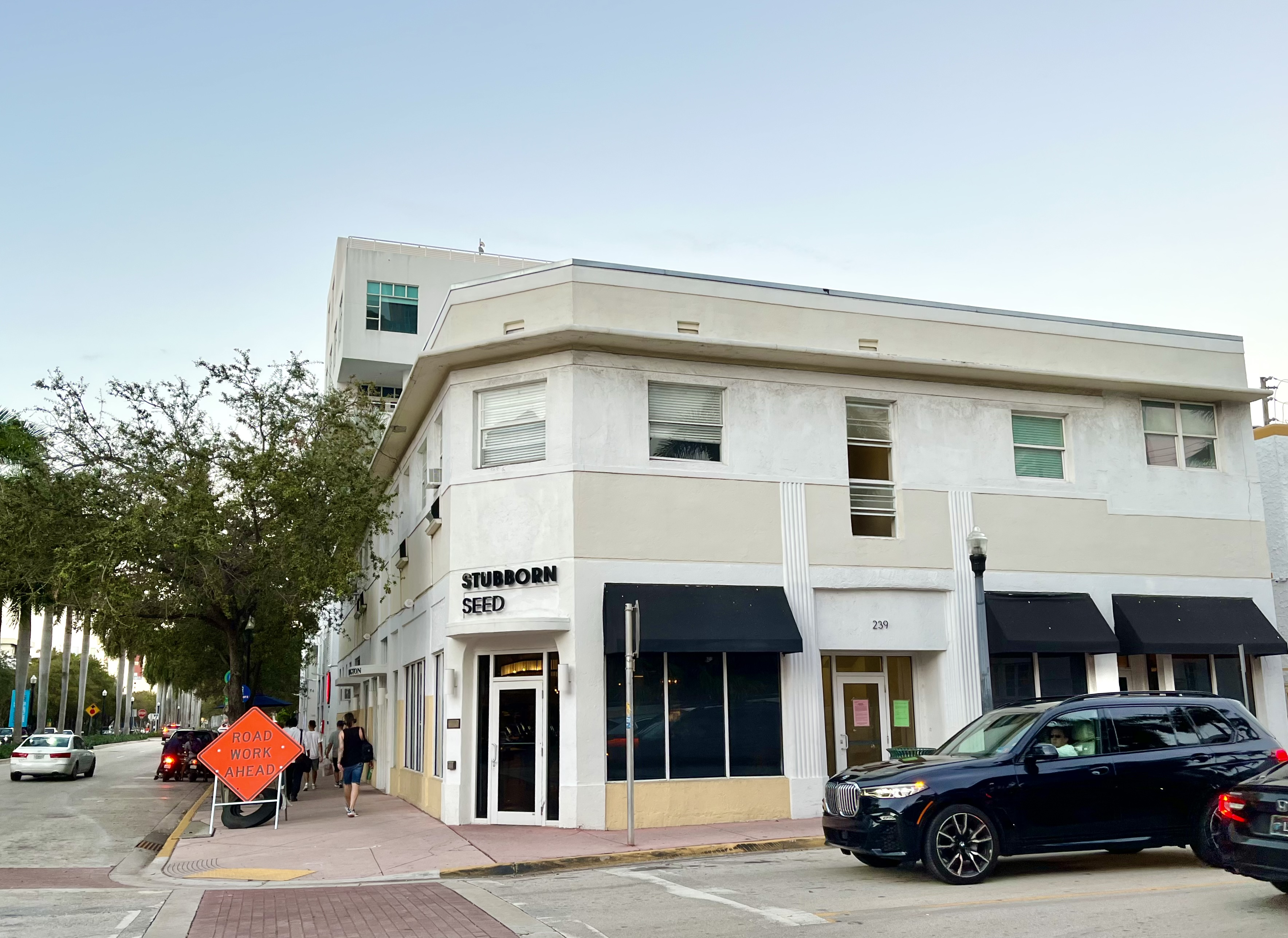
- Interactive map of Stubborn Seed

Restaurant information
- Owner: Jeremy Ford
- Head chef: Jeremy Ford
- Food type: American
- Rating: (Michelin Guide) (Miami)
- Location: 101 Washington Avenue, Miami, Florida, 33139, United States
- Coordinates: 25°46′12.7″N 80°8′5.7″W
- Seating capacity: 70

Stubborn Seed is a Michelin-starred restaurant serving American cuisine in Miami, Florida. The restaurant has a seating capacity of approximately 70 people.

Another location opened in 2025 on the Las Vegas Strip at Resorts World Las Vegas.

== See also ==
- List of Michelin-starred restaurants in Florida
- List of restaurants in the Las Vegas Valley
- List of restaurants in Miami
