= Gabriel Rodríguez (chef) =

Mexican chef

- Born: Mexico
- Culinary career
- Television shows
- Top Chef México; Top Chef: World All-Stars

Gabriel Rodríguez is a Mexican chef and television personality. He is known as being a two-time contestant on the reality television series Top Chef.

== Career ==
Rodríguez started cooking at an early age as a necessity to earn an income. He is originally from Mexico City. After obtaining a culinary degree, Rodríguez worked at Pujol under Enrique Olvera. He later joined the restaurant Arboledas 125 in Chiapas, before becoming head chef at Máximo Bistrot in Mexico City. He has cited Lalo García from Máximo Bistrot as being a major influence on his cooking.

In 2017, Rodríguez was announced the winner of the second season of Top Chef México. After his win, he planned on opening his own restaurant in Mexico City. In 2018, Rodríguez was cooking at Tetetlán, a restaurant in Mexico City.

In 2023, Rodríguez was invited back to compete in Top Chef: World All-Stars. He was in the bottom and almost eliminated more than any of the other competitors. He was subsequently nicknamed "El Gato" referring to the common myth that cats have multiple lives. Although he made it to the finale, Rodríguez was ultimately defeated by Buddha Lo.
