= Top Chef: California =

Season 13 of American television series

- Season 13
- Hosted by: Padma Lakshmi
- Judges: Tom Colicchio; Gail Simmons; Emeril Lagasse; Richard Blais
- No. of contestants: 17
- Winner: Jeremy Ford
- Runner-up: Amar Santana
- Location: San Francisco, Los Angeles, San Diego, Santa Barbara, Oakland, and Palm Springs, California
- Finals venue: Las Vegas, Nevada
- Fan Favorite: Isaac Toups
- No. of episodes: 15

Release
- Original network: Bravo
- Original release: December 2, 2015 – March 17, 2016

Season chronology
- ← Previous; Boston Next → Charleston

Top Chef: California is the thirteenth season of the American reality television series Top Chef. The season was announced by Bravo on April 14, 2015. Similar to Top Chef: Texas, filming took place in several locations across California, including San Francisco, Los Angeles, San Diego, Santa Barbara, Oakland, and the greater Palm Springs area, concluding with a finale in Las Vegas, Nevada. Top Chef: California had a two-night premiere on December 2–3, 2015. Host Padma Lakshmi and head judge Tom Colicchio returned, alongside judges Gail Simmons, Emeril Lagasse, and Richard Blais, among others. The companion web series, Top Chef: Last Chance Kitchen, also returned, premiering immediately following the second part of the season premiere on December 3, 2015. In the season finale, Jeremy Ford was declared the winner over runner-up Amar Santana. Isaac Toups was voted Fan Favorite.

== Contestants ==
Seventeen chefs competed in Top Chef: California, which included one returning contestant, Grayson Schmitz, who originally competed in Top Chef: Texas.

Name	Hometown	Current Residence (Note: The contestants' city and state of residence during time of filming.)	Age
Karen Akunowicz	Kearny, New Jersey	Boston, Massachusetts	37
Angelina Bastidas	Miami, Florida		25
Carl Dooley	Boston, Massachusetts		30
Garret Fleming	Rockford, Illinois	Washington, D.C.	33
Jeremy Ford	Jacksonville, Florida	Miami, Florida	30
Renee Kelly	Shawnee, Kansas	Merriam, Kansas	34
Phillip Frankland Lee	Los Angeles, California		28
Marjorie Meek-Bradley	Ukiah, California	Washington, D.C.	30
Kwame Onwuachi	The Bronx, New York	Washington, D.C.	25
Amar Santana	Queens, New York	Orange County, California	33
Grayson Schmitz	New Holstein, Wisconsin	New York, New York	32
Jason Stratton	Seattle, Washington		35
Frances Tariga-Weshnak	Manila, Philippines	New York, New York	33
Isaac Toups	Rayne, Louisiana	New Orleans, Louisiana	36
Wesley True	Mobile, Alabama	Atlanta, Georgia	38
Giselle Wellman	San Diego, California	Los Angeles, California	31
Chad White	Spokane, Washington	San Diego, California	32

Kwame Onwuachi returned for Top Chef: Colorado, competing in the Last Chance Kitchen. Karen Akunowicz returned for Top Chef: All-Stars L.A. Amar Santana returned for Top Chef: World All-Stars.

== Contestant progress ==
Episode #		1	2	3	4	5	6	7	8	9	10	11	12	13	14	15
Quickfire Challenge Winner(s)		Amar; Frances; Renee	N/A	Grayson	Wesley	Jason	Chad	Jeremy	Karen	N/A		Isaac	Marjorie^{1}	Jeremy^{1}	Jeremy^{4}	N/A
Contestant		Elimination Challenge Results														
1	Jeremy	WIN	IN	HIGH	WIN	IN	IN	IN	HIGH	LOW		LOW	LOW	WIN	IN^{4}	WINNER
2	Amar	HIGH	HIGH	IN	IN	IN	HIGH	IN	HIGH	LOW		WIN	IN	OUT^{3}	WIN^{5}	RUNNER-UP
3	Isaac	IN	HIGH	IN	IN	IN	LOW	IN	LOW	WIN		IN	IN	LOW	OUT	
3	Marjorie	IN	WIN	IN	IN	IN	IN	WIN	LOW	HIGH		LOW	HIGH	LOW	OUT	
5	Carl	HIGH	IN	IN	IN	IN	IN	HIGH	IN	HIGH		HIGH	WIN	OUT		
6	Kwame	IN	IN	WIN	IN	WIN	HIGH	LOW	IN	LOW		HIGH	OUT			
7	Karen	IN	IN	HIGH	HIGH	LOW	WIN	IN	IN	HIGH		OUT				
8	Phillip	IN	LOW	IN	IN	LOW	IN	LOW	WIN	OUT						
9	Chad	IN	IN	IN	IN	IN	IN	HIGH	OUT							
10	Jason	IN	IN	IN	IN	IN	LOW	OUT								
11	Wesley	IN	IN	LOW	IN	HIGH	OUT									
12	Angelina	LOW	HIGH	LOW	LOW	IN	OUT^{2}									
13	Giselle	IN	IN	IN	IN	OUT										
14	Grayson	LOW	LOW	IN	OUT											
15	Frances	IN	LOW	OUT												
16	Renee	IN	OUT													
17	Garret	OUT														

^Note 1: The chef(s) did not receive immunity for winning the Quickfire Challenge.
^Note 2: Angelina lost the Sudden Death Quickfire Challenge and was eliminated.
^Note 3: Amar lost the Sudden Death Quickfire Challenge and was eliminated.
^Note 4: As the winner of the Quickfire Challenge, Jeremy automatically advanced to the finale; therefore, he did not have to compete in the Elimination Challenge.
^Note 5: Amar won Last Chance Kitchen and returned to the competition.

(WINNER) The chef won the season and was crowned "Top Chef".
(RUNNER-UP) The chef was a runner-up for the season.
(WIN) The chef won the Elimination Challenge.
(HIGH) The chef was selected as one of the top entries in the Elimination Challenge, but did not win.
(IN) The chef was not selected as one of the top or bottom entries in the Elimination Challenge and was safe.
(LOW) The chef was selected as one of the bottom entries in the Elimination Challenge, but was not eliminated.
(OUT) The chef lost the Elimination Challenge.

== Episodes ==
No. overall	No. in season	Title	Original release date	US viewers (millions)
189	1	"Stop the Presses"	December 2, 2015	0.80
Quickfire Challenge (Part 1): Seventeen chefs were flown to Los Angeles to begin a six-city expedition across California. To start the competition, the contestants competed in a mise en place race. They were presented with five Californian ingredients: asparagus, artichokes, oranges, chickens, and eggs. Based on their skill sets, the chefs had to decide which ingredient to prep; each set of ingredients was available on a first-come, first-served basis. The first nine chefs to finish their tasks proceeded to the second round. Quickfire Challenge (Part 2): The chefs, separated into three teams, had to work together to create a single dish using one of the prepped ingredients from the previous round. The chefs took turns cooking their team's dish, but were only allowed ten minutes each. The chefs waiting for their turns were required to wear blindfolds. In addition, teammates were not allowed to communicate with each other about the direction of their dishes. The members of the winning team received immunity from elimination.: Red Team: Jason, Jeremy, Wesley; Green Team: Carl, Grayson, Isaac; Blue Team: Amar, Frances, Renee; Winner: Blue Team (Sweet & Sour Chicken with Marinated Slaw); Elimination Challenge: The chefs served 200 guests at a dineLA showcase in Lake Hollywood Park. The contestants were allowed to cook any dish that reflected their culinary style. The guests, which included food critics and bloggers from across the state, scored the chefs' dishes. Their average scores determined which chefs were eligible to win and lose the challenge. Out of the pool of eligible contestants, the judges then decided their most favorite and least favorite dishes.: Winner: Jeremy (Pacific Snapper Crudo with Kombu Gel & Lime Zest); Eliminated: Garret (Vietnamese Chicken Brodo)
190	2	"Pop Up Pandemonium"	December 3, 2015	0.84
Elimination Challenge: The chefs were asked to meet on the roof of their hotel, where they were greeted by Lakshmi and guest judge Ludo Lefebvre. The contestants, split into four teams, were tasked with opening pop-up restaurants around the city of Los Angeles. Each team had to create a menu that embodied the neighborhood their restaurant was located in.: Orange Team (Vegan): Frances, Grayson, Phillip, Renee; Blue Team (Mexican): Chad, Jeremy, Kwame, Wesley; Purple Team (Korean): Carl, Giselle, Jason, Karen; Grey Team (Persian): Amar, Angelina, Isaac, Marjorie; Winner: Marjorie (Yogurt Mousse with Pistachio Sponge Cake & Saffron Orange Syrup); Eliminated: Renee (Stuffed Beet with Tofu, Roasted Cashews & Bitter Spring Green Sauce)
191	3	"Spines and Vines"	December 10, 2015	0.89
Sudden Death Quickfire Challenge: The contestants embarked on their California road trip to the season's first destination: Santa Barbara. Upon arriving at the Sanford Winery, the chefs were required to create a dish featuring uni which paired well with a Sanford wine for Lakshmi and guest judge Dana Cowin. The winner received immunity from elimination.: Winner: Grayson (Wine: Viognier; Crab Salad with Cucumber, Grapefruit & Uni); Sudden Death Cook-off: Giselle, who made the judges' least favorite dish, had to select another chef to compete against in a sudden death cook-off, using ostrich eggs. If Giselle lost to her challenger, she would be eliminated from the competition. She chose to compete against Angelina.; Winner: Giselle (Soft Scrambled Ostrich Egg with Avocado Chipotle Salsa); Elimination Challenge: The chefs were initially paired up to work together on surf and turf dishes. However, following their arrival at the Bacara Resort and Spa, the pairs were informed that they would instead be competing against each other in a "surf vs. turf" competition. As the winner of the Quickfire, Grayson was able to choose which pair to join to form a group of three. The dishes were presented to a table of guest judges, including chefs Cat Cora, Jon Shook, Vinny Dotolo, Suzanne Goin, and Michael Cimarusti. The guest judges voted on which chef won each head-to-head battle; the winners were eligible to win the challenge, while the losers were put up for elimination. Out of the pool of eligible contestants, the regular judges then decided their most favorite and least favorite dishes. The winner received their own barrel of wine from Sanford Winery.: Winner: Kwame (Rock Crab Salad, Turmeric, Asparagus & Radish); Eliminated: Frances (Ginger-Glazed Black Cod with Jicama Cucumber Relish & Roasted Squash)
192	4	"It's a Dry Heat"	December 17, 2015	0.85
Quickfire Challenge: The chefs traveled to their next destination: Palm Springs. After taking a jeep tour to the San Andreas Fault Line, the contestants were required to create dishes using solar-powered equipment for Lakshmi and guest judge José Andrés. The chefs were assigned either a solar stove or solar oven following a random knife draw. The winner received immunity from elimination, a US$10,000 donation to World Central Kitchen on their behalf, and one of the portable solar stoves from the challenge.: Winner: Wesley (Shrimp with Coconut Broth, Lemongrass, Sautéed Mushrooms & Pickled Red Onion); Elimination Challenge: The chefs were separated into two teams based on the equipment they used during the Quickfire Challenge. The teams had to create a four-course progressive meal, beginning with an appetizer and ending with a dessert, to be served at the PGA West golf course for Lakshmi, Colicchio, Blais, and various guests, including José Andrés, Mary Sue Milliken, and John Besh. The chefs did not have access to a kitchen and were forced to serve their dishes from refreshment carts.: Orange Team: Amar, Angelina, Chad, Giselle, Grayson, Isaac, Kwame; Blue Team: Carl, Jason, Jeremy, Karen, Marjorie, Phillip, Wesley; Winner: Jeremy (Citrus-Marinated Halibut with Kumquats, Passion Fruit Caviar & Avocado Mousse); Eliminated: Grayson (Avocado, Chorizo, Shrimp & Corn)
193	5	"Big Gay Wedding"	January 7, 2016	0.91
Quickfire Challenge: The chefs had to create a dish highlighting dates inspired by their most memorable romantic date for Lakshmi and guest judge Chrissy Teigen. The winner received immunity from elimination.: Winner: Jason (Roasted Baby Carrots with Deglet Nour Dates, Brown Butter & Pine Nuts); Elimination Challenge: Working as one team, the chefs catered a wedding reception for 25 gay couples, including guest judge Art Smith, Top Chef: Miami contestant and Top Chef culinary producer Sandee Birdsong, and Top Chef: New York contestant Richard Sweeney.: Winner: Kwame (Pickled Shrimp with Cucumber Onion Salad, Citrus Vinaigrette & Cashews); Eliminated: Giselle (Charred Eggplant Purée with Asparagus, Smoked Mushrooms, Citrus Vinaigrette & Kumquats)
194	6	"Banannaise"	January 14, 2016	0.90
Sudden Death Quickfire Challenge: The competition moved to San Diego for its next road trip destination. The contestants met Lakshmi and guest judge Javier Plascencia at Tuna Harbor outside Seaport Village, where they were assigned the task of preparing fish tacos. The winner received immunity from elimination.: Winner: Chad (Grilled Thresher Shark Taco with Oyster & Sea Urchin Salsa & Sal de Gusano); Sudden Death Cook-off: Angelina, who failed to plate any of her food for judging, had to select another chef to compete against in a sudden death cook-off, using only the ingredients found in a Caesar salad. If Angelina lost to her challenger, she would be eliminated from the competition. She chose to compete against Wesley.; Winner: Wesley (Fried Egg with Anchovy Remoulade, Grilled Romaine, Croutons & Lime Zest); Eliminated: Angelina (Crostini with Garlic, Olive Oil, Dijon Vinaigrette, Grilled Romaine & Anchovy); Elimination Challenge: Lakshmi, Colicchio, Lagasse, and Blais handed out their own specialty craft beers to the contestants, each containing different flavors. The chefs were responsible for capturing the essence of the beers in their dishes. The dishes were served to the four judges and two guests, Steve Gonzales of Stone Brewing Co. and Yuseff Cherney of Ballast Point Brewing Company, who collaborated with the judges on their microbrews.: Red Team (Blais: Beets, Chocolate, Ras el Hanout): Jeremy, Karen, Wesley; Blue Team (Colicchio: Lemon, Coriander, Banana): Isaac, Jason, Kwame; Green Team (Lagasse: Coffee, Cayenne, Tangerine): Carl, Marjorie, Phillip; Yellow Team (Lakshmi: Jalapeño, Ginger, Tamarind): Amar, Chad; Winner: Karen (Roasted Duck Breast with Cocoa Nib Beet Purée & Ras el Hanout Roasted Carrots); Eliminated: Wesley (Lamb with Roasted Beet Purée & Ras el Hanout Roasted Carrots)
195	7	"Back in the Day"	January 21, 2016	1.15
Quickfire Challenge: The contestants returned to Los Angeles. The ten remaining chefs had 20 seconds each to select one ingredient from the Top Chef pantry; these ten ingredients would be the only items they were allowed to use. The chefs chose steak, chicken, jalapeños, salt, vinegar, olive oil, garlic, mushrooms, tomatoes, and celery. Their dishes were served to Lakshmi and Top Chef: Chicago and Top Chef: All-Stars finalist Antonia Lofaso. The winner received immunity from elimination.: Winner: Jeremy (Shaved Beef with Mushroom Crispy Garlic Vinaigrette); Elimination Challenge: In honor of the show's tenth anniversary, the chefs had to create a dish representing themselves from ten years ago. The dishes were served in the Top Chef kitchen to a table consisting of regular judges Lakshmi, Colicchio, Simmons, and Blais; Quickfire Challenge guest judge Lofaso; and various other guests, including Kris Yenbamroong, Zach Pollack, Nancy Silverton, Top Chef: Las Vegas winner Michael Voltaggio, and Top Chef: Boston winner Mei Lin.: Winner: Marjorie (Seared Halibut with Grilled & Roasted Vegetables & Green Curry Sauce); Eliminated: Jason (Poached Trout with Toasted Beets, Spring Vegetable Salad & Goat Milk Vinaigrette)
196	8	"Where's the Beef?"	January 28, 2016	0.97
Quickfire Challenge: The contestants were tasked by Lakshmi and Instagram star Jacques La Merde, later revealed to be a pseudonym for chef Christine Flynn, to create visually appealing food porn using junk food. The chef with the dish that received the highest number of likes on Bravo's Instagram account received immunity from elimination. Due to the nature of the challenge, the winner was only informed of their victory during the Judges' Table segment of the Elimination Challenge.: Winner: Karen; Elimination Challenge: The chefs, separated into three teams, had to cater a black tie bacchanal event called Beefsteak, where the diners forego silverware and eat with their hands. Each team was responsible for making one meat dish, one seafood dish, and two side dishes. The dishes were served to Lakshmi, Colicchio, Hugh Acheson, Beefsteak co-founder and The Simpsons executive producer Matt Selman, Recipe for Deception host Max Silvestri, actor Colin Hanks, Top Chef Masters winner Chris Cosentino, and other patrons.: Red Team: Carl, Karen, Kwame; Blue Team: Chad, Isaac, Marjorie; Green Team: Amar, Jeremy, Phillip; Winner: Phillip (New Zealand Rack of Lamb with Prune Jam); Eliminated: Chad (Ash-Seared Tuna with Citrus, Pickled Beets, Radish & Black Sesame)
197	9	"Restaurant Wars, Part 1"	February 4, 2016	0.93
Elimination Challenge (Part 1): The eight remaining chefs competed in Top Chef's traditional Restaurant Wars challenge. The contestants, split into two teams, were responsible for transforming an empty space into a fully functioning pop-up restaurant within 24 hours. However, in lieu of the typical format, each team had to execute both lunch and dinner services. In addition, each person was required to take a turn as the executive chef or front-of-the-house during either service. The judging panel for both parts of the challenge included Lakshmi, Colicchio, Simmons, and restaurateur Bill Chait.: District LA: Amar, Jeremy, Kwame, Phillip; Appetizer: Arugula Salad with Grilled Asparagus, Crispy Egg & Truffle Vinaigrette (Jeremy); Corn & Sage Velouté with Pancetta (Kwame); Entrée: Roasted Salmon with Ratatouille & Greek Yogurt (Phillip); Roasted Chicken Breast with Polenta & Wild Mushroom Ragout (Amar); Palate: Carl, Isaac, Karen, Marjorie; Appetizer: Pork & Bacon Terrine with Haricot Vert, Gem Lettuces, Prosciutto, Salumi & Golden Raisins (Carl); Marinated Beets with Pickled Cauliflower, Baby Greens & Shaved Garrotxa (Marjorie); Entrée: Flank Steak Salad with Carrots, Daikon, Jicama, Cabbage, Papaya, Peanuts & Herbs (Karen); Seafood Stew with Cod, Shrimp, Clams & Mussels (Isaac)
198	10	"Restaurant Wars, Part 2"	February 11, 2016	0.86
Elimination Challenge (Part 2): Following the lunch services from the previous episode, the teams switched over to their dinner menus.: District LA: Amar, Jeremy, Kwame, Phillip; Apéritif: "Bangkok Dangerous" (Phillip); Amuse-bouche: Beet-Cured Hamachi with Avocado Mousse, Osetra Caviar & Celery Lime Emulsion (Kwame); First Course: Avocado Gazpacho with King Crab Salad, Lemon Pudding & Fried Tortilla (Amar); Strawberries, Pickled Cucumber, Roasted Beets, Arugula & Strawberry Champagne Gazpacho (Phillip); Second Course: Roasted Amish Chicken Thigh with Cauliflower, San Marzano Sauce & Marcona Almond (Kwame); Artichoke Risotto with Crispy Shallot & Marin County Olive Oil (Jeremy); Third Course: Slow-Braised Pork Belly with BBQ Sauce Consommé, Heirloom Tomatoes & Shaved Snap Peas (Amar); Dry-Aged Rib Eye with Celery Root Miso Purée, Miso Butter & Summer Squash (Jeremy); Palate: Carl, Isaac, Karen, Marjorie; Appetizer: Parmesan Parsley Garlic Bread (Marjorie); First Course: Oxtail Consommé with Tripe, Tortellini & Mushrooms (Carl & Karen); Snapper Crudo with Cucumber, Ginger & Grapes (Carl); Second Course: Stuffed Trout with Coconut Rice & Heirloom Tomato (Karen); Braised Lamb Shoulder with Couscous, Pickled Fennel & Orange (Isaac); Third Course: Rogue Creamery Blue Cheese, Dates, Pecans & Plums (Marjorie); California Berry Soup with Buttermilk Panna Cotta, Vanilla & Macadamia Nuts (Marjorie); Winning Team: Palate; Winner: Isaac; Eliminated: Phillip
199	11	"Hammer Time"	February 18, 2016	0.88
Quickfire Challenge: The chefs traveled to Oakland for the next round, where they met up with Lakshmi and guest judge MC Hammer. The contestants had to invent their own rapper names, and then create a dish that visually and conceptually expressed their alter egos.: Winner: Isaac (Toups Legit: Scallops with BBQ Sauce & Grits); Elimination Challenge: The competition moved to its last California location, San Francisco, the setting for the first season of Top Chef. The chefs were asked to make dishes inspired by significant international culinary periods in history. They were given two hours to research their chosen time periods at the San Francisco Public Library. The dishes were served at the Bently Reserve to Lakshmi, Colicchio, Simmons, Joshua Skenes, Mourad Lahlou, Thomas McNaughton, Melissa Perello, Christopher Kostow, James Syhabout, and Top Chef Masters contestant Jonathan Waxman.: Winner: Amar (Paris Belle Époque: Roasted Squab, Seared Foie Gras, Sweetbreads, Tourné Vegetables & Truffle Sauce); Eliminated: Karen (Empire of Japan: Soba Noodles in Mushroom Dashi Broth with Wagyu Beef & Pickled Mushrooms)
200	12	"Wok This Way"	February 25, 2016	0.83
Quickfire Challenge: The chefs had to prepare their best chop suey dish for Lakshmi and guest judge Martin Yan. Each contestant was given 30 minutes and their own wok stations. Instead of immunity, the winner received an advantage during the Elimination Challenge.: Winner: Marjorie (Lobster Chop Suey with Ginger, Thai Chili, Orange & Fresh Vegetables Over Rice); Elimination Challenge: The chefs had to create a dish that exemplified a concept for a fast casual restaurant. They were each given the assistance of a sous chef, consisting of the six most recently eliminated competitors: Angelina, Chad, Jason, Karen, Phillip, and Wesley. As the winner of the Quickfire, Marjorie was able to choose her own sous chef and assign her opponents' sous chefs. She chose to work with Angelina, and picked Jason for Jeremy, Chad for Carl, Karen for Amar, Wesley for Isaac, and Phillip for Kwame. The dishes were served at The Village event space to 150 diners and potential investors. The judging panel for the challenge included Lakshmi, Colicchio, Blais, and guest judge Adam Fleischman.: Winner: Carl (Savory Med: Lamb & Piquillo Pepper Stew with Couscous, Yogurt, Feta Cheese & Fresh Herb Salad); Eliminated: Kwame (Waffle Me: Whole Wheat Waffle Topped with Fried Chicken, Maple Jus, Mustard Seeds, Red Onion & Scallions)
201	13	"Where It All Started"	March 3, 2016	0.88
Sudden Death Quickfire Challenge: The contestants met at the restaurant Commissary, owned by former Top Chef Masters contestant Traci Des Jardins, where they were challenged to make their best piece of toast. Instead of immunity, the winner received a Rational AG oven valued at US$16,000.: Winner: Jeremy (Chicken Liver Mousse, Pickled Cherries, White Raspberries, Jalapeño & Arugula on Ciabatta); Sudden Death Cook-off: The bottom two contestants, Amar and Carl, had to compete against each other in a sudden death cook-off, creating whatever dish they wanted. The chef with the fewest votes from the judges would be immediately eliminated from the competition.; Winner: Carl (Thai Snapper Crudo, Corn, Nectarines, Chilis, Yellow Tomato & Rice Wine Vinegar); Eliminated: Amar (Pan-Roasted Sea Bream, Watermelon Radish, Plum Yuzu Brown Butter & Pickled Mushrooms); Elimination Challenge: The chefs had to create a tribute dish to send-off the restaurant Fleur de Lys, the venue for Top Chef's very first Quickfire Challenge. The dishes were served to 40 VIP guests, including owner and Top Chef Masters contestant Hubert Keller, Top Chef Masters winner Chris Cosentino, and Top Chef: San Francisco winner Harold Dieterle.: Winner: Jeremy (Filet de Loup de Mer, Truffle Potato Purée, Pommes Soufflées & Heirloom Tomato); Eliminated: Carl (Foie Gras en Gelée with Black Pepper, Strawberries & Fines Herbes)
202	14	"Magic Hour"	March 10, 2016	0.92
Quickfire Challenge: The three remaining competitors arrived at the MGM Grand in Las Vegas, Nevada, for the season finale. There, the winner of Last Chance Kitchen, Amar, was reinstated into the competition. At the beginning of the challenge, each chef was dealt a random playing card displaying one of the four suits. Historically, each suit correlated to a specific class in society: spades for nobility, hearts for the clergy, diamonds for merchants, and clubs for peasants. Depending on the card they were dealt, the chefs would have to create a dish using the ingredients available to their particular class. In addition, the chefs with the higher class cards were able to use the items from the lower class pantries. To assist them with cooking, the chefs were paired up with previously eliminated contestants. Marjorie chose Karen, Isaac chose Carl, and Jeremy chose Kwame, leaving Amar with Phillip. The dishes were served to 150 guests, including their guest judge Rick Moonen. The winner received an automatic spot in the finale.: Winner: Jeremy (Merchant: Butter Poached Chicken with Zucchini Purée, Chicken Crackling with Pickled Sweet & Hot Grapes); Elimination Challenge: The chefs had to put on an entertaining performance while cooking for Lakshmi, Colicchio, Simmons, and guest judges Julian Serrano and David Copperfield.: Winner: Amar (Squab, White Chocolate Truffle Ganache, Whipped Balsamic, Mole Sauce & Potato "Onion" Ring); Eliminated: Marjorie (Roasted Duck à l'Orange with Braised Endive, Caramelized Romesco & Fennel Purée); Isaac ("Chicken Fried Steak" Dry-Aged Rib Eye with Crispy Hen Skin, Quadruple Fennel Purée & Yuzu Hollandaise)
203	15	"Finale"	March 17, 2016	1.17
Elimination Challenge: The finalists had to create a four-course menu highlighting one specific ingredient per course. The contestants received help from two sous chefs of their choosing and their former mentors. Amar was assisted by Marjorie, Kwame, and Charlie Palmer, while Jeremy was assisted by Angelina, Carl, and Jean-Georges Vongerichten. The dishes were served head-to-head to a full dining room at Colicchio's restaurant, Craft.: Amar: First Course: Seared Tuna Tataki, Habanero Coconut Dressing, Compressed Pineapple & Toasted Peanuts; Second Course: Sea Urchin Risotto with Butter-Poached Lobster, Finger Limes, Jicama & Shellfish Froth; Third Course: Harissa-Rubbed Rack of Lamb with Braised Lamb Pastilla, Date Ginger Purée & Yogurt Emulsion; Fourth Course: Coconut Financier, Mango Sorbet, Passion Fruit Curd, Tropical Fruit Salad & Brûlée Meringue; Jeremy: First Course: Foie Gras Two Ways with Chili, Passion Fruit & Marshmallows; Second Course: Slow-Cooked Branzini, Herbal Lime Vinaigrette, Squash & Tomatoes; Third Course: Duck with Roasted Maitake Mushrooms, Smoked Chilis, Buttermilk & Lemon; Fourth Course: Ricotta and Mozzarella Cheese Cylinder with Spiced Fig Jam, Pumpernickel Toast & Honey; Winner: Jeremy; Runner-up: Amar

== Last Chance Kitchen ==
No.	Title	Original air date
1	"Winning Out of Losing"	December 3, 2015
Challenge: The first two eliminated chefs had to create a winning dish using the ingredients from their opponent's losing dish.: Garret: Tofu with Coconut & Tea Braised Mustard Greens, Roasted Cashews & Lemon Vinaigrette; Renee: Pan Roasted Chicken, Sauteed Dandelion Greens & Crispy Poached Egg; Winner: Garret; Eliminated: Renee
2	"Fresh Veggie Challenge"	December 10, 2015
Challenge: The chefs had to create a standout dish using one vegetable in its entirety and prepare it in three different ways. At least one of their preparations had to showcase Hidden Valley Ranch salad dressing and seasoning mix. The amount of food waste the chefs produced from their dishes was also factored into judging.: Garret: Beet Greens with Pickled Beet Stems, Crème Fraîche Ranch Vinaigrette, Grilled Beets & Fried Beet Skins; Frances: Stir-Fried Broccoli with Broccoli Purée, Dried Chiles & Pickled Broccoli Stems; Winner: Garret; Eliminated: Frances
3	"Surprise Ingredients!"	December 17, 2015
Challenge: The chefs were forced to step outside their comfort zones by incorporating exotic ingredients into their dishes. Each contestant had to select two ingredients, which were packaged into mystery boxes, from a display; the chefs only learned about the identity of their ingredients once their designated cooking time started. Garret received tomatillos and crisp broad beans, while Grayson received coconut and Ginkgo nuts.: Garret: Broad Bean-Crusted Branzino with Melted Fennel, Chorizo & Tomatillo Salsa; Grayson: Pork Tenderloin with Sweet & Sour Coconut Shrimp, Fresh Herbs & Candied Ginkgo Nuts; Winner: Grayson; Eliminated: Garret
4	"Decisions, Decisions, Decisions"	January 7, 2016
Challenge: The chefs were given 20 seconds to look at a display of various ingredients and conceptualize two different dishes that could be cooked in 20 minutes. Colicchio then selected which of their two ideas each contestant would have to create.: Grayson: Roasted Lamb with Fig & Port Wine Sauce & Aligot Potatoes; Giselle: Chicken, Summer Polenta with Corn & Tomato Salad; Winner: Grayson; Eliminated: Giselle
5	"A Delicious Burger"	January 14, 2016
Challenge: The chefs had 15 minutes to craft their best burgers.: Grayson: Beef & Pork Belly Burger with Mushrooms, Pickled Red Onion & Wisconsin Cheddar Cheese; Angelina: Beef & Pork Burger with Avocado, Heirloom Tomatoes, Pickled Habanero & Arugula; Wesley: Lamb Burger with Ras el Hanout, Goat Cheese & Fennel, Jalapeño Onion Slaw; Winner: Angelina; Eliminated: Grayson, Wesley
6	"Boring Ingredients, Awesome Dish"	January 21, 2016
Challenge: The chefs had 30 minutes to create a tasty dish out of boring and bland ingredients.: Angelina: Teriyaki Shrimp with Potato & Onion Hash, Celery & Orange Salad; Jason: Teriyaki Salmon, Soft Cooked Egg, Broccoli & Sweet Potato Salad; Winner: Jason; Eliminated: Angelina
7	"Beef!"	January 28, 2016
Challenge: The chefs had 25 minutes to make a hearty beef dish. However, they were only allowed to use their knives for butchering and other prep work during the first five minutes of their allotted cooking time.: Jason: "Chuletón" Bone in Ribeye, Grilled Onions & Braised Herbs; Chad: Beef Cheek with Huitlacoche Purée, No Bean Chili of Tongue & Cow Eye; Winner: Jason; Eliminated: Chad
8	"Only One Chef Can Call the Shots"	February 11, 2016
Challenge: The incoming contestant, Phillip, was told to set the terms of the challenge, including the main ingredient and time allotment. In the end, both chefs had to create a dish with sweetbreads in 20 minutes.: Jason: Fricassée of Poached & Pan Roasted Sweetbreads, Artichoke & Saffron; Phillip: Roasted Sweetbreads, Salmon Belly, Sweet Potato Chips, Shaved Apple & Radish with Yogurt, Ginger & Carrot Sauce; Winner: Jason; Eliminated: Phillip
9	"Teppanyaki Time!"	February 18, 2016
Challenge: The chefs had 10 minutes to prepare their ingredients and another 10 minutes to put on an entertaining show at a teppanyaki table.: Jason: Seared Wagyu New York Steak with Shiitake Mushroom, Asparagus & Quail Egg; Karen: Lobster Fried Rice with Quail Egg, Mushrooms & Asparagus; Winner: Jason; Eliminated: Karen
10	"Breakfast, Baby!"	February 25, 2016
Challenge: The chefs had 15 minutes to create a standout breakfast dish.: Jason: Olive Oil Poached Deep Fried Egg with Migas; Kwame: Egg Bhurji, Brioche & Cilantro; Winner: Jason; Eliminated: Kwame
11	"San Francisco Staple"	March 3, 2016
Challenge: The chefs had 30 minutes to create a dish featuring sourdough. The top two contestants moved on to compete in the Last Chance Kitchen finale.: Jason: Bruschetta with Smoked Salmon & Hazelnut Aigrelette, Artichoke Frittata & Shaved Radish; Amar: Beef Wellington with Grilled Asparagus, Red Wine Jus & Béarnaise Sauce; Carl: Green Apple & Green Tomato Gazpacho with Grilled Shrimp & Sourdough Croutons; Winners: Amar, Carl; Eliminated: Jason
12	"Fishy Finale"	March 3, 2016
Challenge: For their final Last Chance Kitchen challenge, the chefs had 12 minutes to cook any fish dish.: Amar: Crispy Loup de Mer with Onion Soubise & Yuzu Caper Brown Butter; Carl: Grilled Red Snapper with Apricot & Ginger Marmalade; Winner: Amar; Eliminated: Carl
