= Poireaux vinaigrette =

Marinated leek dish from French cuisine

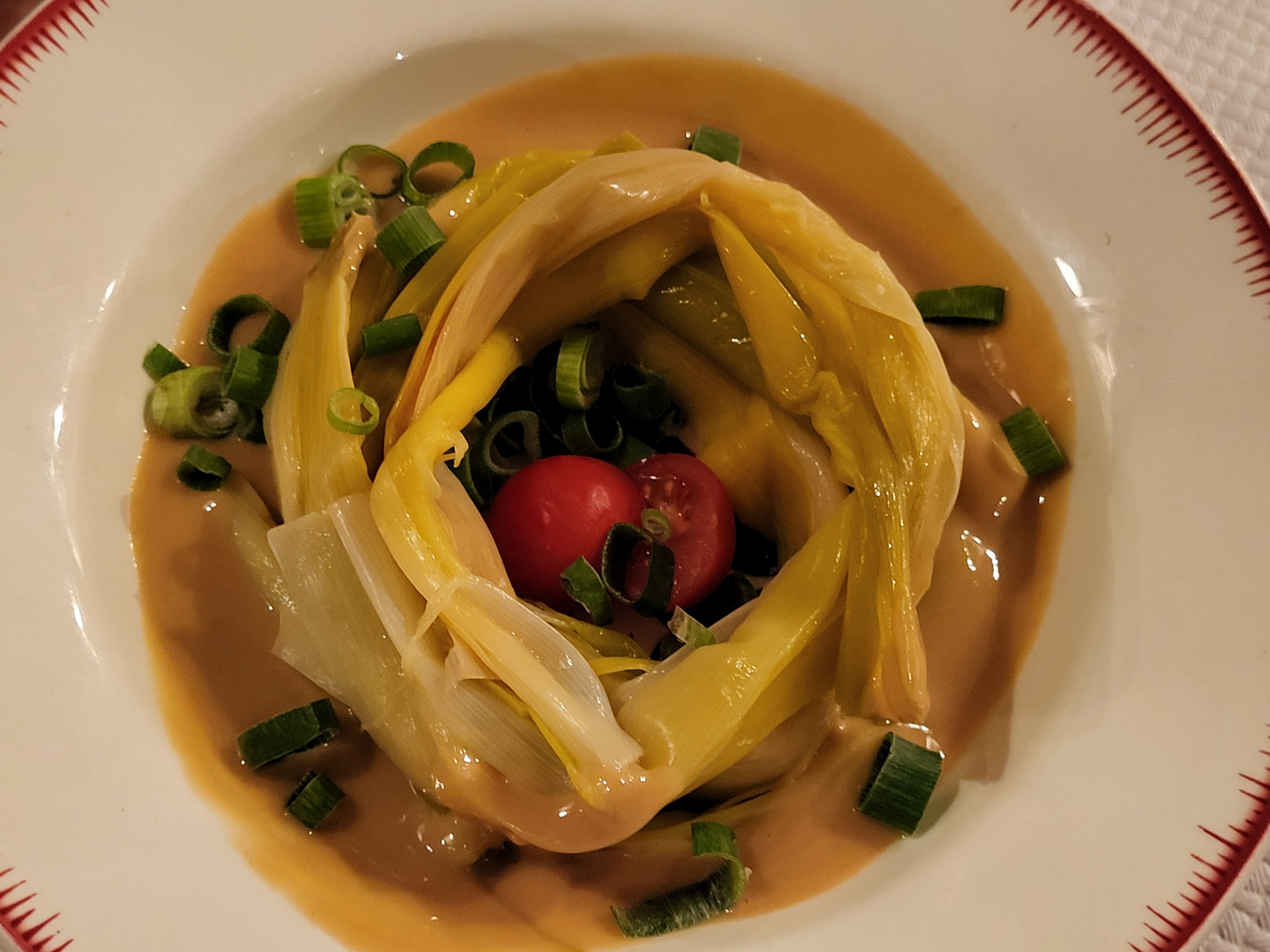
Poireaux vinaigrette

Poireaux vinaigrette is a dish of marinated leeks from French cuisine. It's a classic French dish still served at traditional cafes and bistros. To prepare the dish a vinaigrette with mustard is served over boiled leeks. The dish is sometimes garnished with chopped parsley and hard-boiled egg, and served with smoked salmon.
