= Melissa Perello =

American chef

- Born: Nutley, New Jersey, U.S.
- Education: Culinary Institute of America
- Culinary career
- Cooking style: Modern American
- Rating: Michelin stars
- Current restaurants: Octavia, San Francisco (2015–present), Frances, San Francisco (2009–present)
- Previous restaurants: Aqua, San Francisco, Charles Nob Hill, San Francisco, Fifth Floor, San Francisco, M. Georgina, Los Angeles (2019–2020)
- Television show: Chefs vs. City
- Awards won: Chronicles Rising Star Chef 2002; Food & Wine Best New Chef 2004

Melissa Perello is an American chef, she is best known for holding a Michelin star at her restaurant Frances in San Francisco. She had previously won a star at restaurant Fifth Floor, and has won awards from both Chronicles and Food & Wine magazines.

== Biography ==
While still in high school, she gained her first kitchen based job at a local country club, where she worked 40 hours a week. She dined at Aqua, and was invited into the kitchen. She subsequently impressed the chefs and was offered an apprenticeship at the restaurant. She attended Culinary Institute of America in Hyde Park, New York from 1994 to 1996.

Following her passion for food, moved to San Francisco to work under the tutelage of Michael Mina at Aqua. After working with Mina, whom she cites as a major influence, Perello transferred to Aqua's sister restaurant, Charles Nob Hill, where she worked alongside mentor, Chef Ron Siegel. She became executive chef and earned accolades for her California-inspired French cuisine. While at Charles Nob Hill, Perello was awarded the San Francisco Chronicle's Rising Star Chef honor in 2002, one of Food & Wine's Best New Chefs in 2004, and James Beard Foundation Rising Star Chef nominations in 2002, 2003 and 2004. Perello then took the helm at Fifth Floor and led the restaurant to a Michelin star in 2006.

In 2009, Perello opened her first restaurant, Frances, named after her greatest culinary influence, her grandmother. Located in San Francisco, Frances gained a Michelin star. Perello raised $400,000 for the restaurant through investors and had repaid them in full within eighteen months. Offering modern California cuisine in a relaxed neighborhood setting, Frances garnered glowing reviews and earned a James Beard Foundation Award nomination for Best New Restaurant in 2010. Additionally, Frances was named an Esquire magazine Best New Restaurant by John Mariani and one of Bon Appétit magazine's “Ten Best New Restaurants in America” in 2010.

In 2015, Perello opened her second restaurant venture, Octavia, named for its location. It has an open floor plan. Octavia earned a Michelin Star in its first year with Perello being lauded as a 2016 James Beard Semifinalist for 'Best Chef West.'

In November 2019, Perello opened her third restaurant, M. Georgina, in Row DTLA. M. Georgina was named after Perello's paternal grandmother and has a menu that is "micro-seasonal, with Italian leanings and occasional subtle nods to other cuisines." Due to the COVID-19 pandemic the restaurant closed after four months of operation.

She has appeared on Food Network's Chefs vs. City as a contestant during season one. As of the 2012 Michelin Guide, she is one of ten female chefs in the United States to hold a Michelin star.
