= Jeremy Ford (chef) =

American chef (born 1985)

- Born: 1985 (age 40–41); Jacksonville, Florida, U.S.
- Culinary career
- Current restaurant(s): Stubborn Seed (South Beach, 2016-present) Krun-Chi (Miami) The Butcher's Club (PGA National Resort & Spa)
- Previous restaurant(s): Matthews (Jacksonville, Florida, 2001-2002), L'Orangerie (Los Angeles), Patina, Matador Room
- Television show(s): Top Chef: California Fast Foodies, co-host

Jeremy Ford (born 1985) is an American chef. While working for chef Jean-Georges Vongerichten's Matador Room, Ford participated in the thirteenth season of Top Chef in 2015, ultimately winning the season's title. He subsequently left Matador Room and opened his own restaurant: Stubborn Seed, a Michelin-starred restaurant in Miami, and later Krun-Chi in Miami. In 2021, he opened The Butcher's Club at the PGA National Resort & Spa, and started to co-host TruTV's Fast Foodies with fellow Top Chef winner Kristen Kish and Iron Chef America season 13 episode 8 winner Justin Sutherland.

== Early life ==
Ford developed his love for cooking at 14 years old when he met his maternal grandmother in his hometown of Jacksonville, Florida.

== Career ==
He began his cooking career at 16 years old as the garde manger of Matthews, a four-diamond Mediterranean-style restaurant in Jacksonville. A year later, he moved to Los Angeles to work at the world-renowned L'Orangerie under executive chef Christophe Eme, absorbing French-cooking skills, later moving to Patina to work with master chef Joachim Splichal. In 2008, he secured a position with the celebrated South Florida chef Dean Max at the latter's prominent restaurant, 3030 Ocean in Fort Lauderdale. Much later, he beat 30 other chefs in a two-day competition to get the executive chef position at Vongerichten's Matador Room. He earned his first Michelin star in 2022 for restaurant Stubborn Seed.

== Personal life ==
Ford is the father of three daughters.
