= Concasse =

Cooking term in French

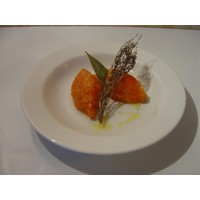
Tomato concassé

Concassé, from the French concasser, "to crush or grind", is a cooking term meaning to roughly chop any ingredient, usually vegetables or fruit. This term is particularly applied to tomatoes, where tomato concassé is a tomato that has been peeled, seeded (seeds and skins removed), and chopped to specified dimensions. Specified dimensions can be rough chop, small dice, medium dice, or large dice. The most popular use for tomato concassé is in an Italian bruschetta, typically small dice concassé mixed with olive oil and fresh basil, and sometimes other ingredients such as onion, olives, or anchovies.

Tomato concassé is also added to béarnaise sauce to produce Choron sauce, which is commonly served with lobster dishes.

== See also ==
- Brunoise
