= Sara Bradley =

American chef

- Born: Paducah, Kentucky
- Culinary career
- Cooking style: Southern, Jewish, and Appalachian cuisines
- Current restaurant: Freight House
- Television shows: Top Chef: Kentucky; Top Chef: World All-Stars; Tournament of Champions

Sara Bradley is an American chef based in Paducah, Kentucky, known for her appearances on the television series Top Chef, Chopped, and Tournament of Champions. Her cooking features Southern, Jewish, and Appalachian influences.

== Early life and education ==
Bradley was born and raised in Paducah. Her mother is Jewish and her father is not. He grew up in the Appalachians. Her mother's grandparents emigrated from Poland and Prussia. Her parents met working in Lexington, Kentucky. She was raised Jewish. She has a younger sister and an older brother.

Her mother and paternal grandmother taught her to cook and preserve. As a child she attended Camp Ben Frankel in Carbondale, Illinois. She attended Heath High School. She attended the University of Kentucky, graduating with a degree in psychology. She worked in kitchens during high school and college and attend culinary school at Johnson and Wales in Charlotte, North Carolina, after graduating from college.

== Career ==
Bradley worked in New York and Chicago in Michelin-starred restaurants prior to returning to Western Kentucky, to Paducah, to open Freight House, which focuses on local seasonal ingredients. The restaurant is located in a former warehouse. The cuisine is Southern with influences from Jewish cuisine and Appalachian cuisine. It offers a large selection of Kentucky bourbons.

=== Television ===
In 2019, she was the runner-up in Top Chef: Kentucky. Her matzo ball soup was popular with judges; Bradley recounted having originally called matzo balls "cracker dumplings" because the term matzo ball was unfamiliar to local diners, but after the episode aired, she was able to use the correct term. In 2023, she competed in Top Chef: World All-Stars, where she also placed as a runner-up.

In August 2023, Bradley won the Food Network's Chopped: All American Showdown.

In October 2024, Bradley won the Chopped: Legends tournament, winning $25,000 for herself and $25,000 for the charity she was competing for, Maiden Alley Cinema, a nonprofit theater in Paducah. She announced on the show that she would donate the $25,000 that she'd won for herself to her second-place competitor's (Top Chef Season 5 Winner Hosea Rosenberg) charity, which funds research for a rare bone disease affecting his daughter.

In April 2025, Bradley was a finalist on Tournament of Champions Season VI, the first rookie competitor to reach the finals, where she came runner-up to Antonia Lofaso.

== Personal life ==
Bradley is married and has two daughters. While competing on Top Chef: World All-Stars, she pumped an estimated 15 U.S. gallons (57 L) of breast milk to ship home from London for her 9-month old baby via a service called Milk Stork. She cited both the formula shortage the United States was then experiencing and the fact she continued to be able to produce as factoring in the decision.
