= Olivye =

Olivye (Russian: Оливье́) is the Russian transliteration of the French surname Olivier. It may refer to:

- Lucien Olivier
  - Olivier salad
