= Shanghai-style salad =

Salad dish in Haipai cuisine

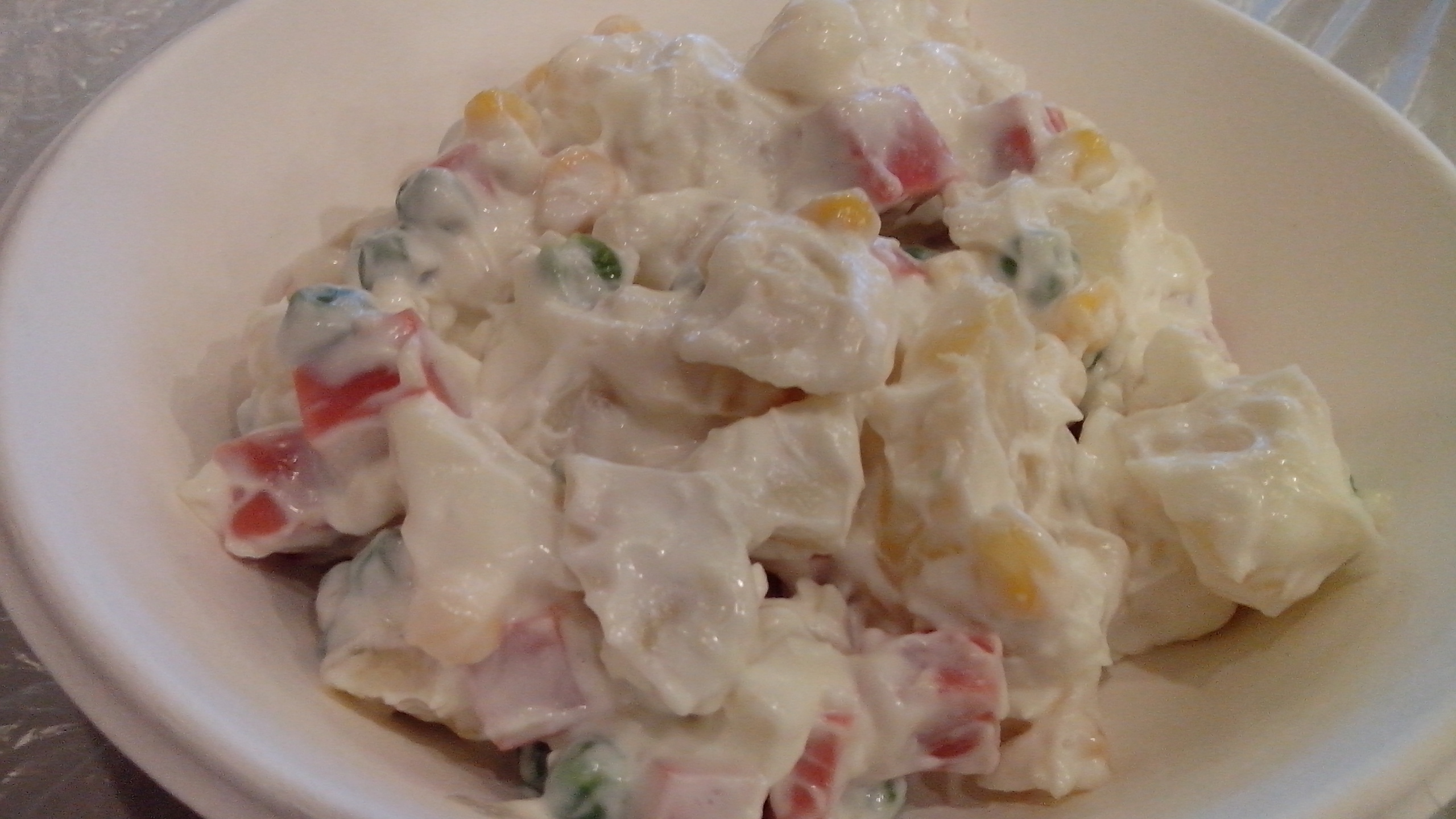
- Course: Hors d'oeuvre
- Place of origin: China
- Region or state: Shanghai
- Invented: Early 20th century (probably 1930s)
- Serving temperature: Chilled or room temperature
- Main ingredients: Hongchang sausage, potato, carrot, pea, handmade sauce (made with egg yolk, olive oil, white pepper and white vinegar) or thousand island dressing or mayonnaise

Shanghai-style salad (Chinese: 上海色拉; pinyin: shàng hǎi sè lā; Wade–Giles: shang^{4}-hai^{3}-se^{4}-la^{1}) is a traditional appetizer in Haipai cuisine. Generally considered a localized dish derived from the Olivier salad, it originated from Western cuisine but was modified according to the customary taste of Shanghai people.

== History ==
=== Origin (The first half of the 20th century) ===
After the forced opening in 1840s, Western restaurants began to be set up in Shanghai. In order to adapt to Chinese tastes, these restaurants absorbed the essence of different Western culinary traditions and improved their dishes, resulting in a unique Haipai cuisine during the first half of the 20th century. Shanghai-style salad is a fusion of Russian potato salad (Olivier salad) and local tastes and ingredients.

Modified potato salad first appeared in the early 20th century in Russian restaurants owned by Russians who escaped from the Soviet Union after the October Revolution. However, the origin of the term “Shanghai-style salad” is not clearly documented. In the 1930s, "Shanghai Potato Salad" appeared on the menu of the Chez Louis Restaurant (Chinese: 喜乐意西菜社), known as the famous Haipai western Red House Restaurant today, with much the same recipe as today. After that, the dish became popular in Western restaurants in Shanghai.

=== Development in PRC (after 1949) ===
After the establishment of the People's Republic of China, especially during the Cultural Revolution, the number of western restaurants sharply declined. However, Shanghai-style salad didn't die out with the decline of Western restaurants, but has migrated from high-end restaurants to the tables of ordinary residents. Today, Deda and Red House Restaurant are the few state-run western restaurants that still offer Shanghai-style salad made in the traditional way. While in Sanlin and some other delicatessens, Shanghai residents can buy the dish at a low price.

== Common ingredients ==
Shanghai-style salad's common ingredients are diced Hongchang sausage, diced boiled potatoes, carrots and peas. The mixed sauce that Shanghai salad uses differs from that of Olivier salad and makes Shanghai salad special and better accepted by the local community. Traditional Shanghai salad uses a handmade sauce made from combining egg yolk, olive oil, white pepper and white vinegar in a specific order instead of ready-made mayonnaise. This sauce reflects a combination of Chinese and foreign cooking methods.

In recent years, people also use Thousand Island dressing or mayonnaise as a simplified version of the traditional Shanghai salad sauce, but other ingredients remain the same.

== Vendors ==
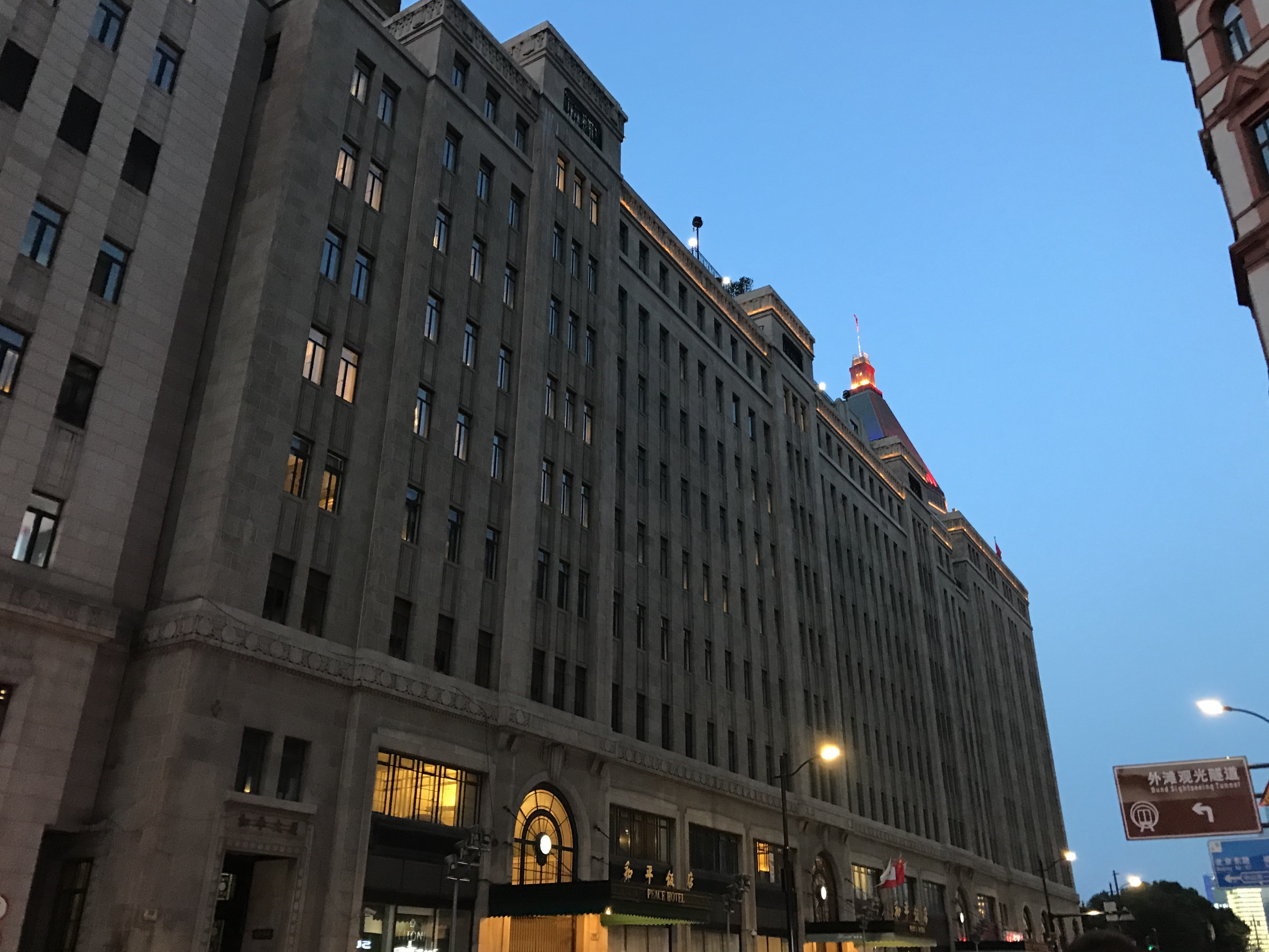
Cathay Hotel (Now Peace Hotel)

The Shanghai Deda Western food restaurant, founded in 1897, is one of the oldest and most famous vendors for Shanghai-style salad, and still serves it today. Another eatery, Cathay Hotel (now known as Peace Hotel), also began serving Shanghai Salad in 1938 according to their menu, which is regarded as a symbol of the influence of Russian-style cuisine in Shanghai.

Another famous restaurant in Shanghai that serves Shanghai-style Salad is the Red House, which was previously a French restaurant called Chez Louis Bar.

== Health concerns ==
Mayonnaise, the primary ingredient of Shanghai-style salad, has been linked to health-related issues such as high cholesterol and high fat. This has resulted in food researchers focusing on trying to replace the high fat ingredients as well as egg yolk; however, this replacement means that extra ingredients are required to act as a stabilizer. A popular substitute for mayonnaise is ordinary salad sauce which can be purchased in most supermarkets in Shanghai, however this ingredient faces the same health concerns as mayonnaise.

== Cultural impact ==
Shanghai salad, first introduced by overseas Russians, witnessed a special period in Shanghai when Western and Eastern cultures fused together. To better accommodate the stomach of Chinese people, modifications were made. For example, the traditional cold potatoes sometimes were replaced by hot ones. As the time went by, the salad, together with Shanghai-style borscht and Shanghai-style fried pork chops, became a standing dish that symbolized Haipai cuisine on the dining tables of Shanghai households.

Shanghai salad can also be regarded as an epitome of the cultural fusion that took place during the nineteenth century, and this characteristic of Shanghai-style salad is mentioned in the book called "Shanghai Salad" by Chen Danyan.

== See also ==
- List of salads
