= Macedonia (food) =

French salad of fruit or vegetable pieces

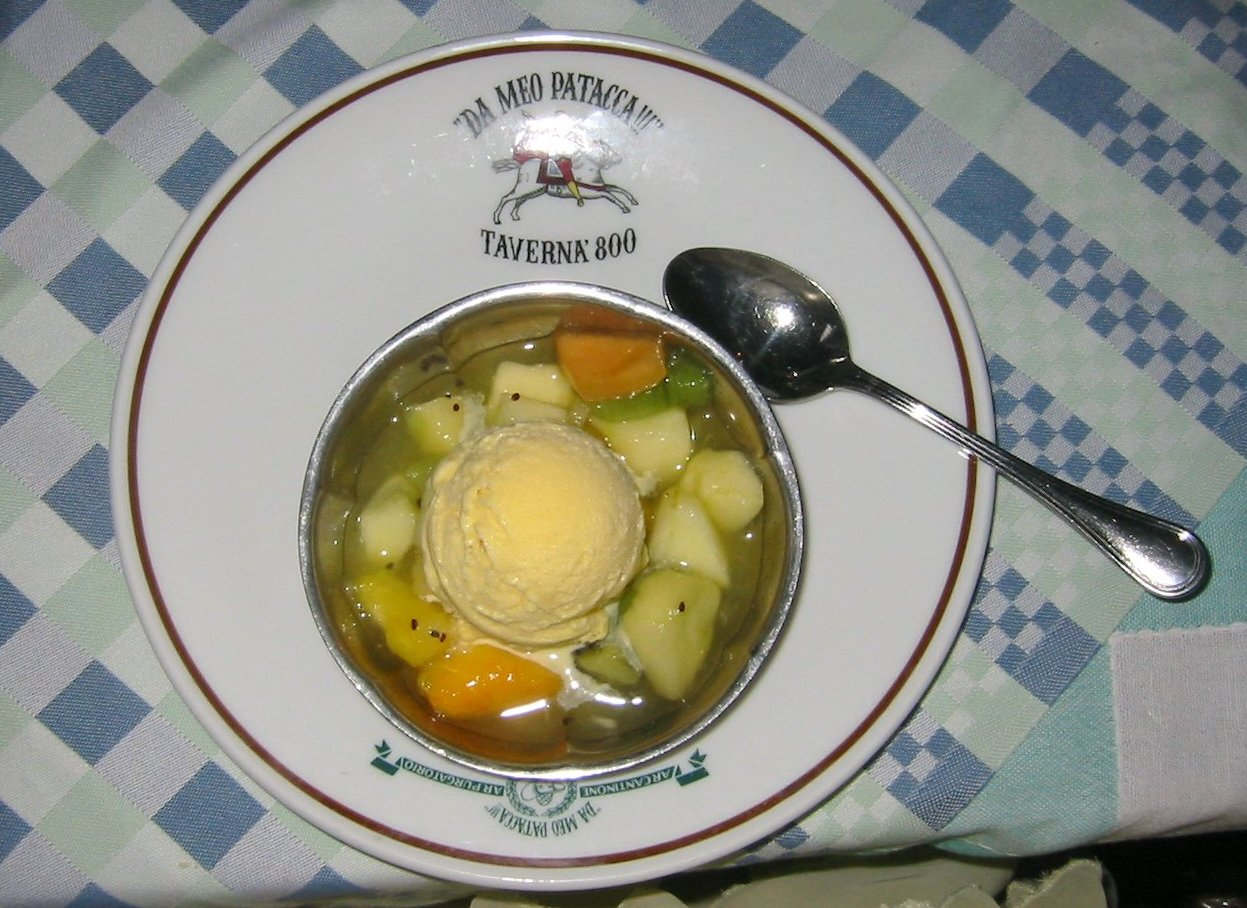
- Macedonia with ice cream
- Type: Salad
- Place of origin: France
- Main ingredients: Fruits or vegetables

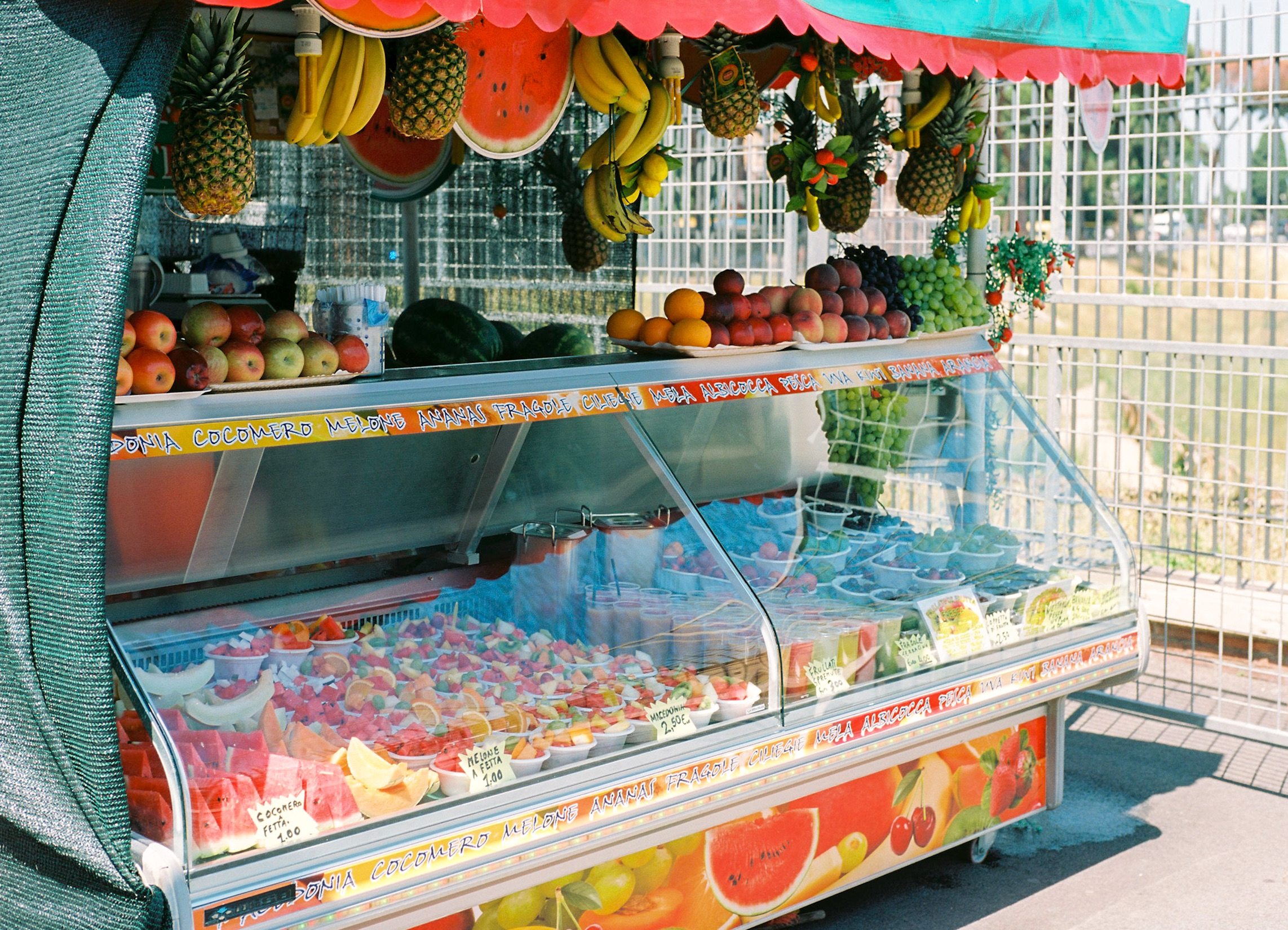
Macedonia, fruit for sale in Rome, Italy, 2016

Macedonia (French: macédoine), in French cuisine, is a salad composed of small pieces of fruit or vegetables. Fruit Macedonia is a fresh fruit salad and is a common dessert in Greece, Romania, Spain, France, Italy and South America. Vegetable Macedonia or Macédoine de légumes nowadays is usually a cold salad or hors d'oeuvre of diced vegetables, in France often including red beans. Macédoine de légumes is also a hot vegetable dish consisting of the same vegetables served with butter. Prepared macédoine, a mixture of diced vegetables and often peas, is often sold canned or frozen. It is sometimes mixed with mayonnaise combined with aspic stock, making it similar to Russian salad.

== Etymology ==
The word macedonia was popularised in the middle of the 18th century in France to refer to mixed fruit salad. This probably alludes to the diverse origin of the people of Alexander's Macedonian Empire, but that is "not fully established". It is sometimes said that it refers to the ethnic mixture in 19th century Ottoman Macedonia. Starting later in the 18th century, macedoine could mean any medley of unrelated things, not necessarily edible.

== See also ==
- List of culinary knife cuts
- List of salads
