= Chiffon =

Chiffon may refer to:

- Chiffon cake, a light, fluffy cake
- Chiffon (fabric), a type of fabric
- Chiffon margarine, a butter substitute
- Chiffonade, a French term for the cutting of herbs or leafy green vegetables into long, thin strips
- The Chiffons, girl group of the 1960s
  - Chiffon, a character in the musical Little Shop of Horrors and the film, named after the girl group
