= Dicing (disambiguation) =

Dicing is a method of preparing food by chopping it into small cubes or dice.

Dicing may also refer to:

- Dicing, or check (pattern), a simple textile (or other design) pattern, like a chess board
- Wafer dicing, a step in semiconductor processing where device chips are cut out of a wafer
