= Saint Nicholas' Church, Shanghai =

Former Russian Orthodox church in Shanghai

Coordinates: 31°13′07″N 121°27′20″E

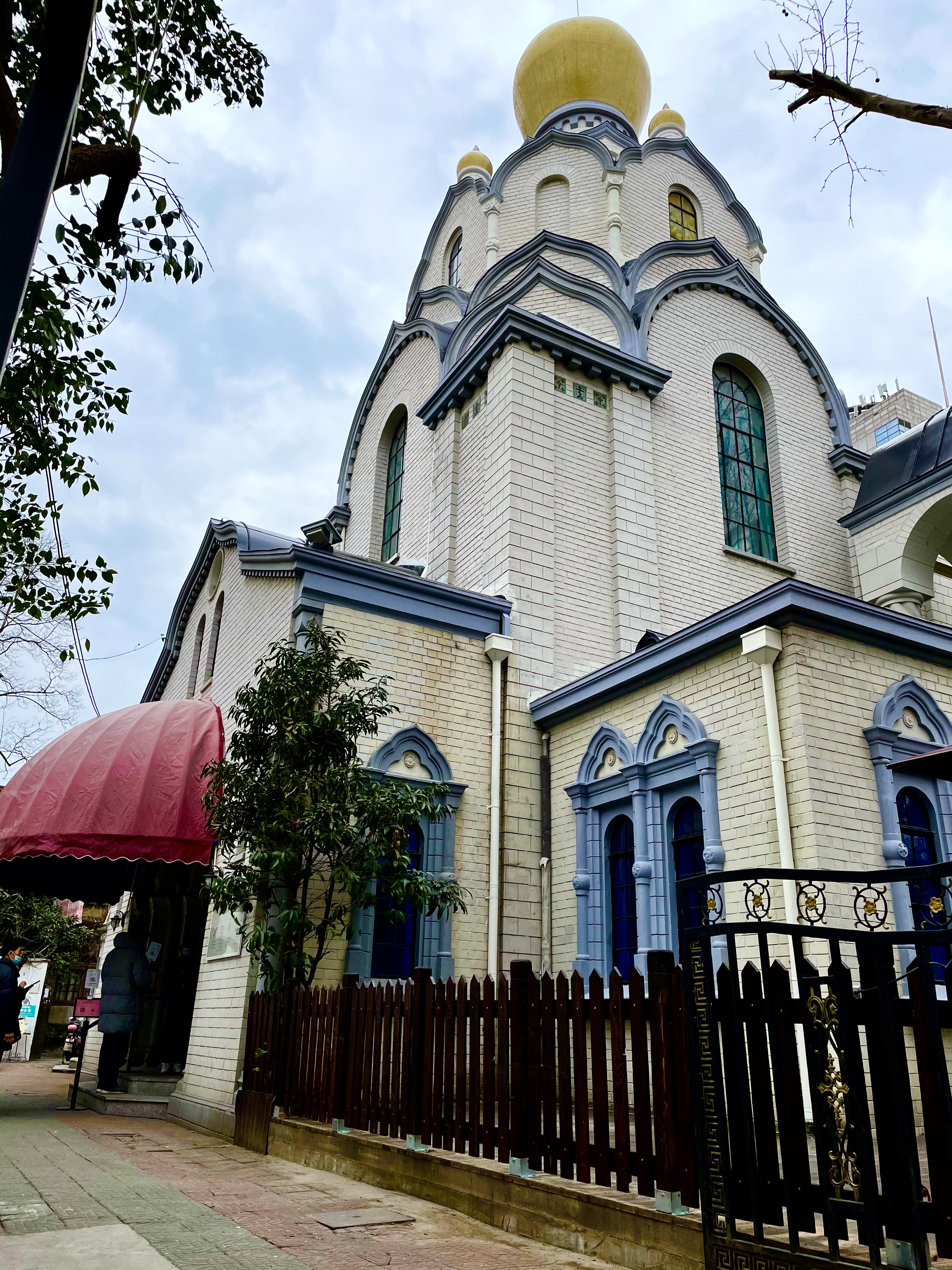

St Nicholas Church (Chinese: 圣尼古拉堂) was a Russian Orthodox Church in the former French Concession of Shanghai at 16 rue Corneille, now known as Gāolán Lù. Formerly the building was home to a French restaurant on the ground floor called Ashanti and a Spanish one in the basement called La Boca. It has been a protected monument since 1994. It is currently occupied by a bookshop with the loft being consecrated for occasional Orthodox services.

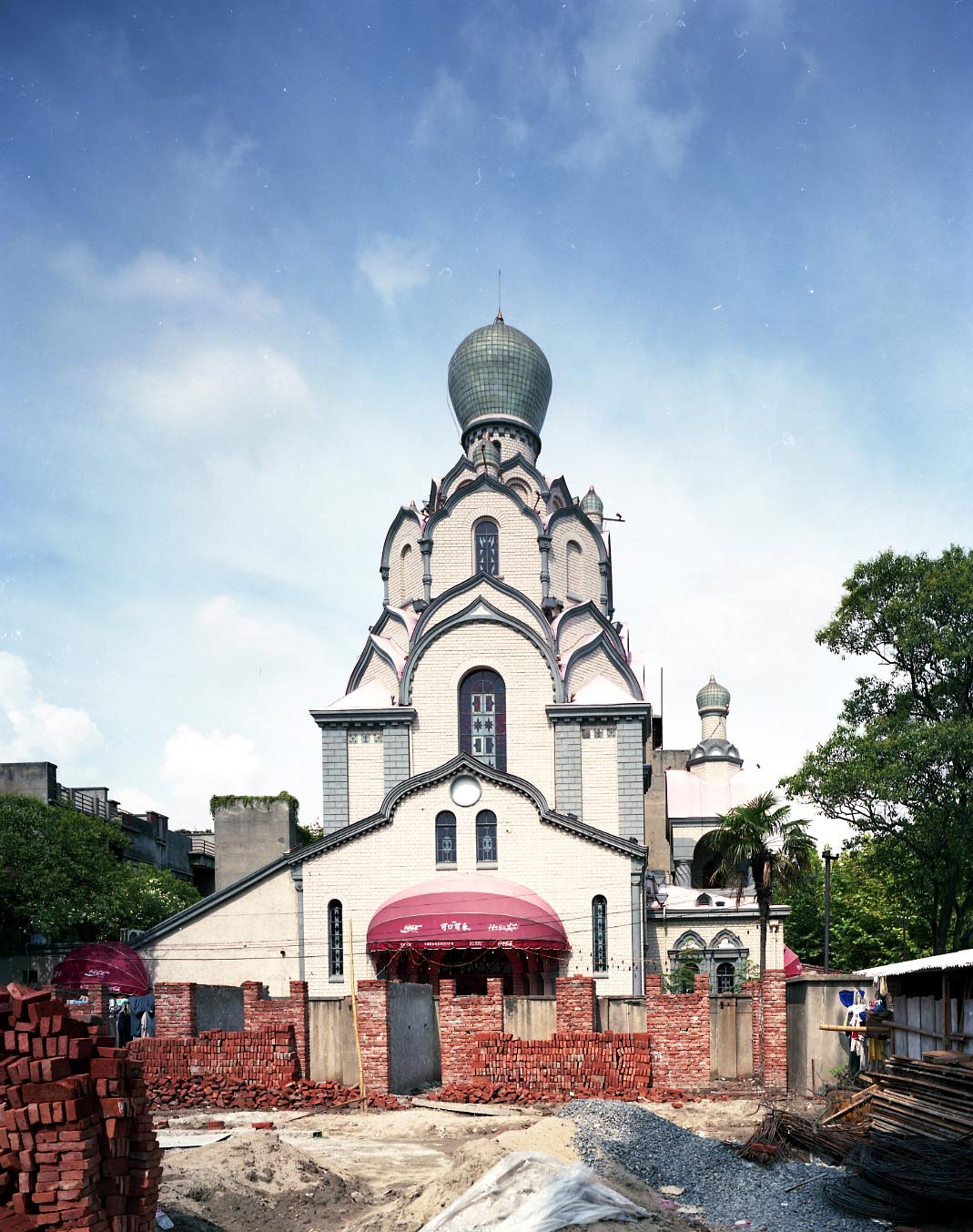
St. Nicholas, The Russian Orthodox Military Church, photographed in 1994 using a large format Sinar camera with Fuji color film.

== History ==
The building was built in 1932 on the initiative of White Russians in Shanghai, refugees of the revolution of 1917, especially General Glebov. It was consecrated in 1937 in honour of St Nicholas, the patron saint of the former Russian Emperor, Nicholas II. The church was closed in 1949, when Europeans left following the Chinese Civil War. It was first converted into a warehouse and then a laundry. It briefly became a nightclub but this eventually ceased following Russian diplomatic complaints.

During the Cultural Revolution, locals hung a portrait of Chairman Mao from the church in order to protect it from desecration by the Chinese authorities. In 1994, it was listed as a protected landmark by the Shanghai city authorities. In 2001 it became a French restaurant and bar but this closed in November 2006. During the Expo 2010, its loft was reconsecrated to allow Russian Orthodox services to be held there on a lease agreement. It was the first Orthodox service conducted in communist China outside of Russian diplomatic premises since 1965 when all Orthodox churches were closed and nationalised.

In 2019 it was converted into a poetry bookshop. The architects designed it so that the bookshelves had no backing so the church walls could be seen, due to the fact that it was a designated protected monument and the structure could not be altered.
