= Red House (Shanghai) =

Restaurant in Shanghai, China

The Red House (红房子西菜馆 Hongfangzi xicaiguan) is a restaurant in Shanghai serving a Shanghainese-style of Western food, known as Haipai cuisine. It is the oldest French-style restaurant in Shanghai. It now belongs to the 新亚富丽华 Xin Ya Fu Li Hua group.

== History ==
The Red House was opened in 1935 by Louis Rovere, an Italian Jew, at 845 Avenue Joffre (then 霞飞路 Xiafei Road ; now 淮海中路 Huaihai Middle Road). The restaurant's name was Chez Rovere (罗威饭店 Luo Wei fandian).

When the Pacific War broke out in 1941, Rovere was captured and spent the war in an internment camp. After the Japanese surrender in 1945, he returned to the restaurant business and in 1946 opened another restaurant at 37 Ave du Roi Albert (now Shaanxi South Road), again serving Western food, this time with the name Chez Louis Bar (喜乐意 Xi Le Yi). This building had a bright red exterior, hence its familiar name of The Red House.

In the early 1950s, when most foreigners left China, Liu Ruifu 刘瑞甫, a local Shanghainese, bought the restaurant for 2000 yuan and continue to run it as a Western-style restaurant. In 1956, at the suggestion of Peking Opera star Mei Lanfang, the restaurant was re-registered as a public-private partnership restaurant, with the name “The Red House Western Restaurant” (红房子西菜馆).

In the Cultural Revolution, when Western food was considered bourgeois and banned, the restaurant was renamed The Red Flag Hotel, and Chinese food was served in its canteen.

In 1972, with international changes and Nixon’s visit to China, Western style was once again allowed, and the name of the restaurant was changed back to the Red House Western Restaurant.

In 1994, the restaurant was renovated and expanded, and was moved to the site of Louis Rovere's first restaurant at 845 Huaihai Middle Road. In 1998, the Red House, now owned by Asia Furama, was transformed into a joint-stock enterprise. In June 1999, The “Red House” was registered as a trademark (no.1289770).

== Popular culture ==
"To eat Western food, go to the Red House" became a popular phrase in Shanghai. Scenes of the restaurant appear in TV series, including "A Shanghai family" (上海一家人), the adaptation of Ye Xin's novel "Family Education" (叶辛：《家教》）, and in Cao Wenxuan's novel Dragonfly Eyes (曹文轩:《蜻蜓眼》).
