= Dicing =

Cutting food into small cubes

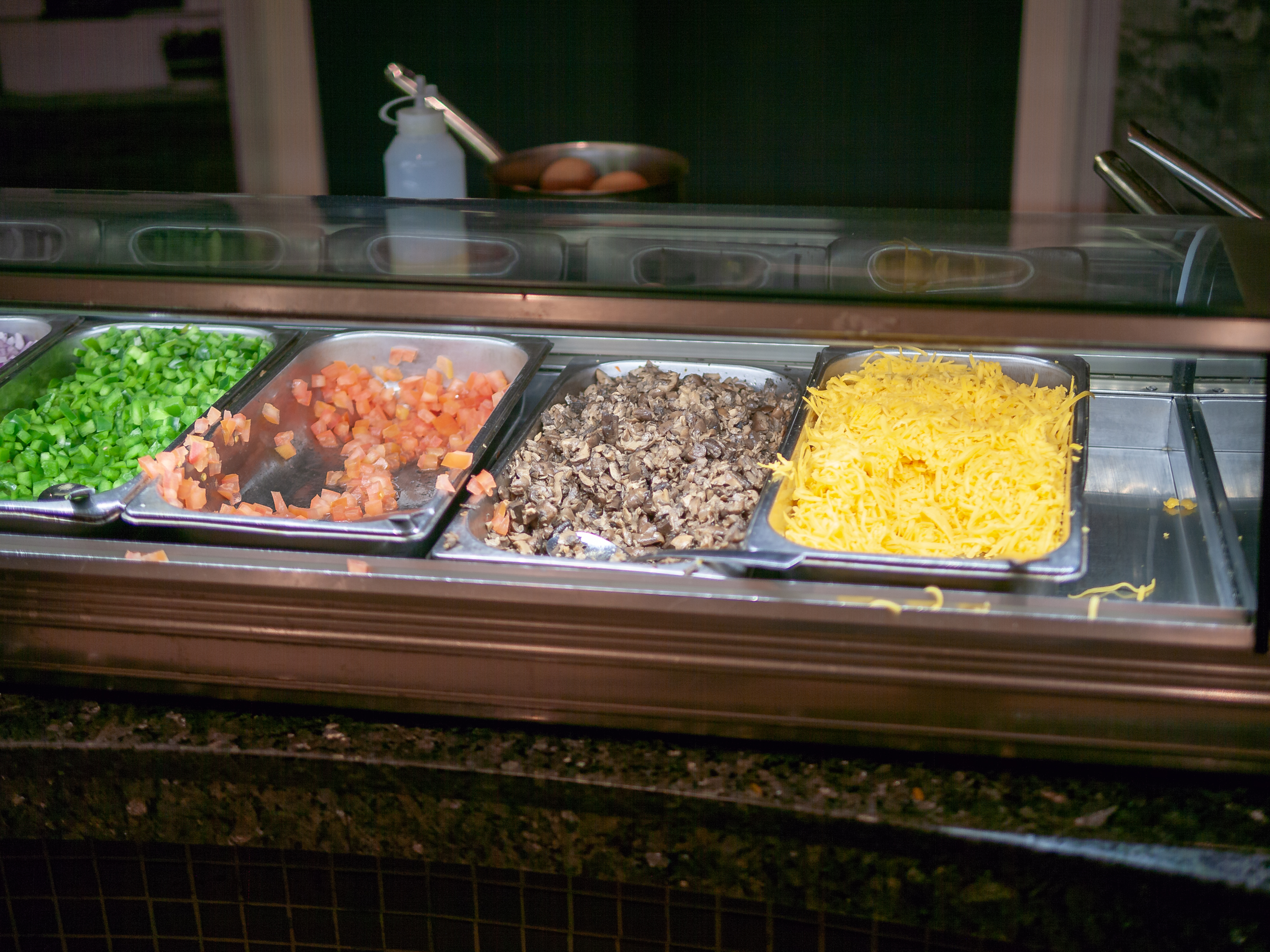
Diced green bell peppers, tomatoes and mushrooms (left to right)

Dicing is a culinary knife cut in which the food item is cut into small blocks or dice. This may be done for aesthetic reasons or to create uniformly sized pieces to ensure even cooking. Dicing allows for distribution of flavour and texture throughout the dish, as well as somewhat quicker cooking time. Dicing usually applies to vegetables prepared in this way but it can also apply to the preparation of meat or fish and fruit. Brunoise is an especially small size, produced from further cutting of julienne-style food.

== See also ==
- Russian salad and macédoine de légumes, foods based on cooked diced vegetables.
