= Chiffonade =

Slicing technique for leafy green vegetables

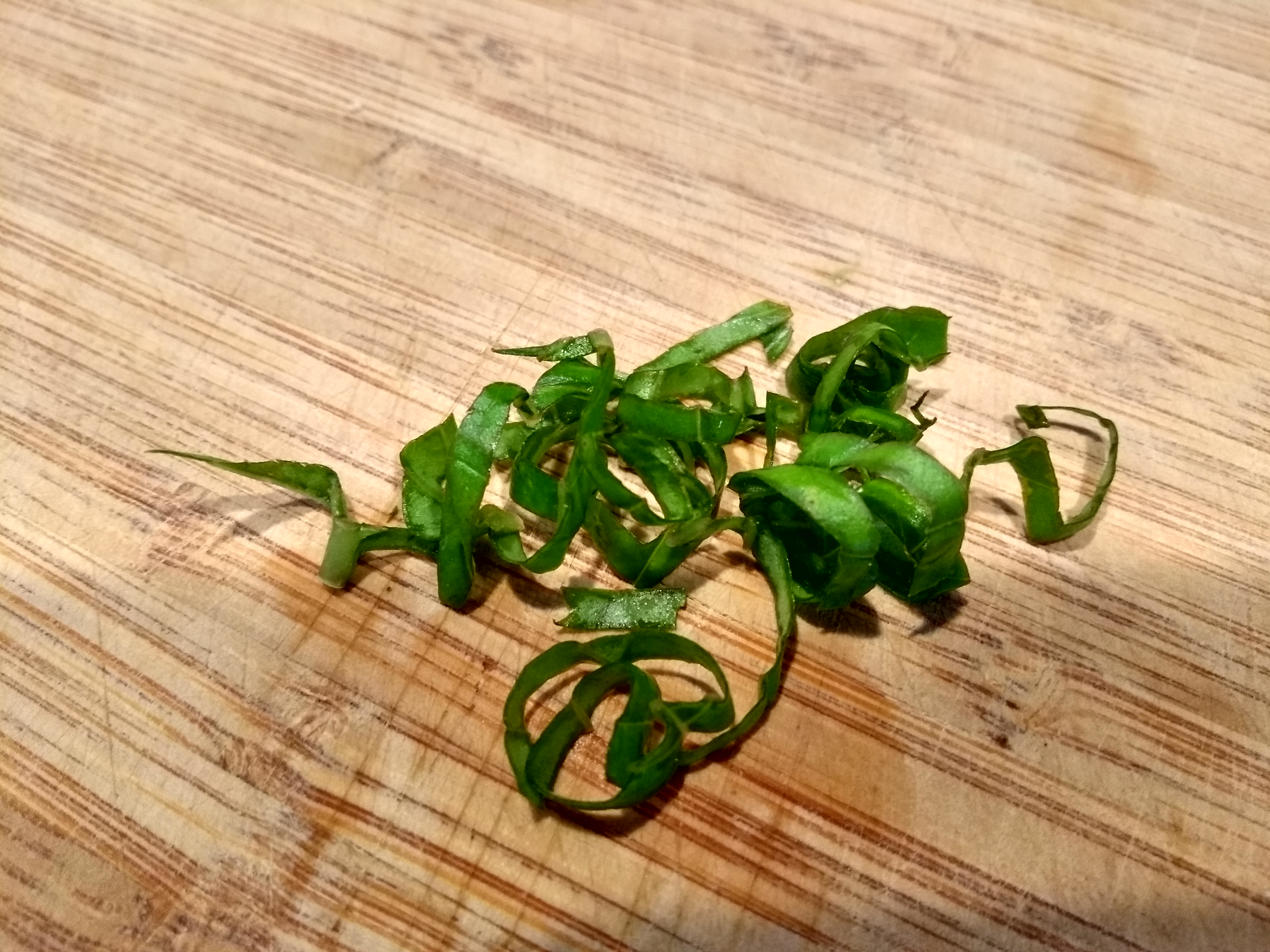
Chiffonade [cut] of basil

Chiffonade (French: [ʃi.fɔ.nad]) is a slicing technique in which leafy green vegetables such as spinach, sorrel, or Swiss chard, or a flat-leaved herb like basil, are cut into long, thin strips.

== Method ==
The method of the chiffonade technique is accomplished by stacking leaves, rolling them tightly, then slicing the leaves perpendicular to the roll.

The technique can also be applied to thin crepes or omelets to produce strips.

This technique is not suited to small, narrow, or irregularly shaped herb leaves such as coriander, parsley, thyme, or rosemary. It requires a consistent, flat surface area for the knife to accomplish the ribbons.

"Chiffonade" means little rags in the original French, which have come into English to refer to the little ribbons formed from finely cutting the leaves in this technique.

== See also ==
- Brunoise
- Julienning
