= Haipai cuisine =

Western-style cuisine of Shanghai, China

Haipai cuisine (Chinese: 海派西餐; pinyin: hǎipài xīcān; Wade–Giles: hai³-p'ai⁴ hsi¹-ts'an⁴) is a Western-style cooking that is unique to Shanghai, China. It absorbs the traditions of several cuisines from other regions of China and of Western cooking, adapting them to suit the local taste according to the features of local ingredients. It is divided into several major types: French, Italian, Russian, British, and German, among which the Russian-type dishes, such as the Shanghai-style borscht (simplified Chinese: 罗宋汤; traditional Chinese: 羅宋湯; pinyin: luó sòng tāng; Wade–Giles: lo² sung⁴ t'ang¹), receive a great welcome as they are more affordable. Today, the most famous dishes of Haipai cuisine are luó sòng tāng, fried pork chops (breaded cutlet), and Shanghai salad (a variety of Olivier salad). Apart from the above-mentioned common dishes, baked clams, baked crabs, and jin bi duo soup ("million dollar soup") are also popular among the Haipai dishes.

For a hundred years since it opened to foreign traders, Shanghai has witnessed the increasing popularity of Haipai cuisine. However, since China began to implement the reform and opening up in 1978, an increasing number of authentic Western restaurants set up in Shanghai. As a result, the number of Haipai restaurants gradually declined, and only a few are left by now, though luó sòng tāng and fried pork chops with Worcestershire sauce are still enjoyed and considered to be the flavor of "old Shanghai".

== History ==
After Shanghai opened to outside nations, Western culture was gradually brought into Shanghai, and Western restaurants began to spring up in the city. According to documentary records, the first Western restaurant, Xiang Fan, was founded in Fuzhou Road. At that time, Western dishes were also known as "Fan dishes". Although Western food became fashionable, it was still hard for the Chinese people to adapt to some types of Western cooking, such as medium rare beefsteak. As a result, Shanghai Western cuisine absorbed the essence of many different Western cooking traditions and gradually formed different styles of food: French, Italian, Russian, British, German style, etc. French-style cuisine focused on fresh materials and exquisite food; British-style cuisine focused on seasoning, and Italian-style cuisine focused on the original flavor, so each had its own characteristics. After the October Revolution in the Soviet Union in 1917, a large wave of Russian white émigrés poured into China, and in particular in Shanghai. They were named luó sòng. The Shanghai Russians opened more than 40 Russian restaurants on Xiafei Road (Avenue Joffre, now Middle Huaihai Road), in an area which at that time became known as "Little Russia". Two of their dishes: borscht and buttered bread (butterbrot) gained a great popularity in Shanghai due to their low price. By the end of 1937, Shanghai had more than 200 Haipai restaurants, most of them were located in Xiafei Road and Fuzhou Road.

The establishment of the People's Republic of China in 1949 was a turning point in the development of Shanghai Western cuisine. A large number of Western-style restaurants closed down during this period, and only 18 restaurants remained in the Huangpu District after adopting the pattern of public-private Joint Management. Besides, due to a shortage of supplies at the time, "going to Western restaurants" was not a common thing for ordinary people. However, the Shanghai people, whether because of love for Western food or memories of the ancient time, still tried by every means to enjoy western food in this difficult era. One way was to use a variety of local ingredients instead of importing Western ingredients, such as using Chinese mitten crabs instead of sea crabs, self-roll soda crackers instead of bread powder, and so on. Western food was completely removed from China after the Cultural Revolution. Back then, the famous Western restaurant known as the Red House (Shanghai) was renamed to the Red Flag Restaurant, and offered Chinese traditional dishes. Since the reform and opening up in China, the number of authentic Chinese restaurants in Shanghai has increased dramatically. On the contrary, the number of Western-style restaurants that offer Haipai dishes have declined gradually, and many Western restaurants shut down in the 1990s.

== Traditional dishes ==
=== Shanghai-style borscht ===
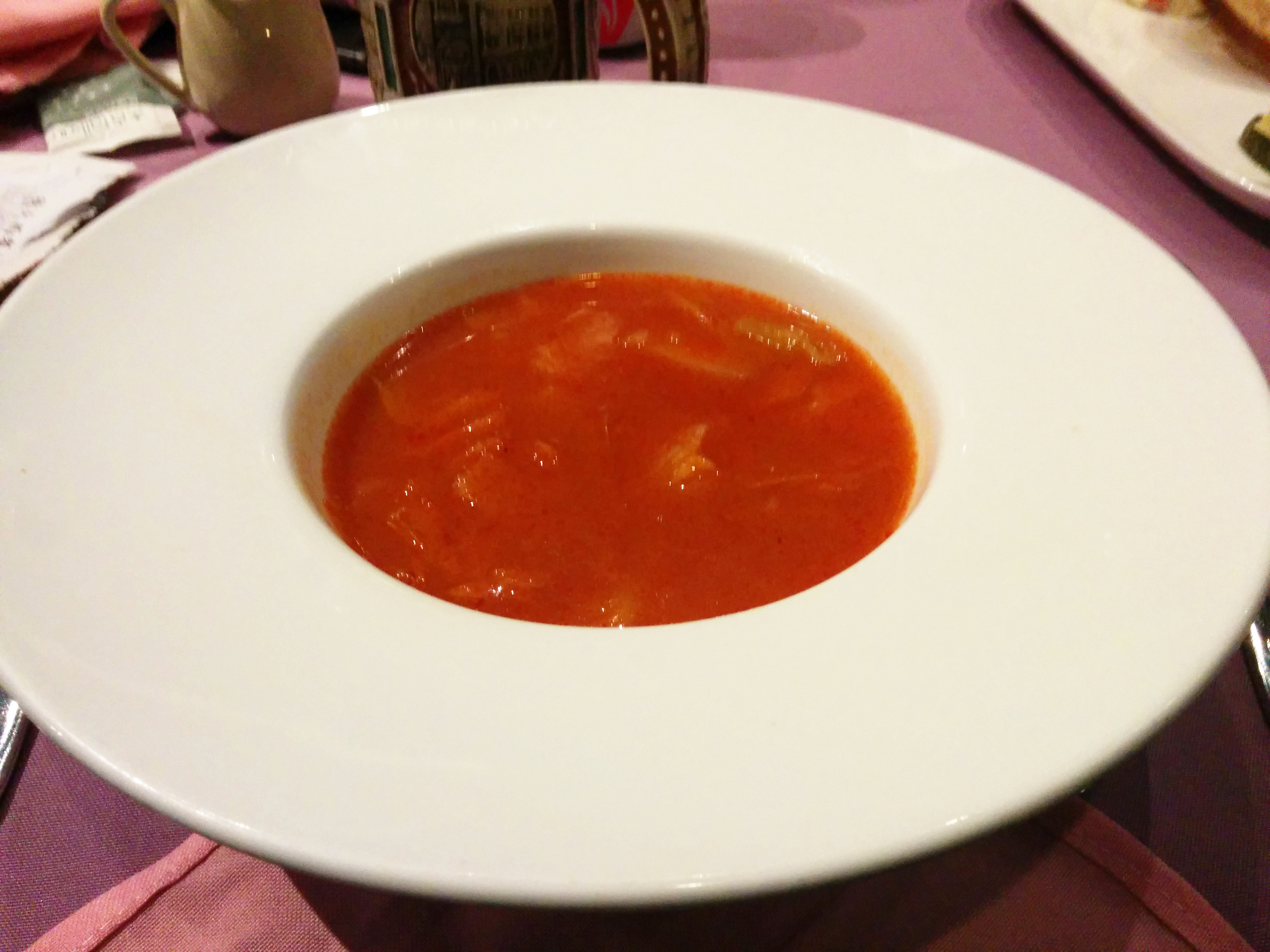
Shanghai-style borscht

Being quite different from its Russian origin, the Chinese-style borscht (Chinese: 罗宋汤; pinyin: luósòng-tāng; lit. 'Russian soup'), originated in Harbin, close to the Russian border in northeast China, and has spread as far as Shanghai and Hong Kong. A Shanghai variety appeared when the Russian emigres settled down in the former French Concession in the early 20th century. The recipe was changed by removing beetroot and using tomato paste to color the soup as well as to add to its sweetness, because Shanghai's climate was bad for planting beets and the soup's original sour taste was alien for the local people. Later, cooks usually fried the tomato paste in oil to reduce its sour taste, then put white sugar in the soup to make it both sour and sweet. Alternatively, pre-sweetened ketchup can be used instead. Likewise, cream is replaced by flour to generate thickness without inducing sourness. Most recipes contain beef and its broth, potatoes, and leaf vegetables; Hongchang sausage and Worcestershire sauce are sometimes added as well. As more people made borscht at home, its recipes changed to please the different tastes of its makers, occasionally taking on the influence of mirepoix or minestrone with the inclusion of carrots, celery, onions, and bay leaves. The soup is often accompanied by rice.

=== Shanghai-style fried pork chops ===
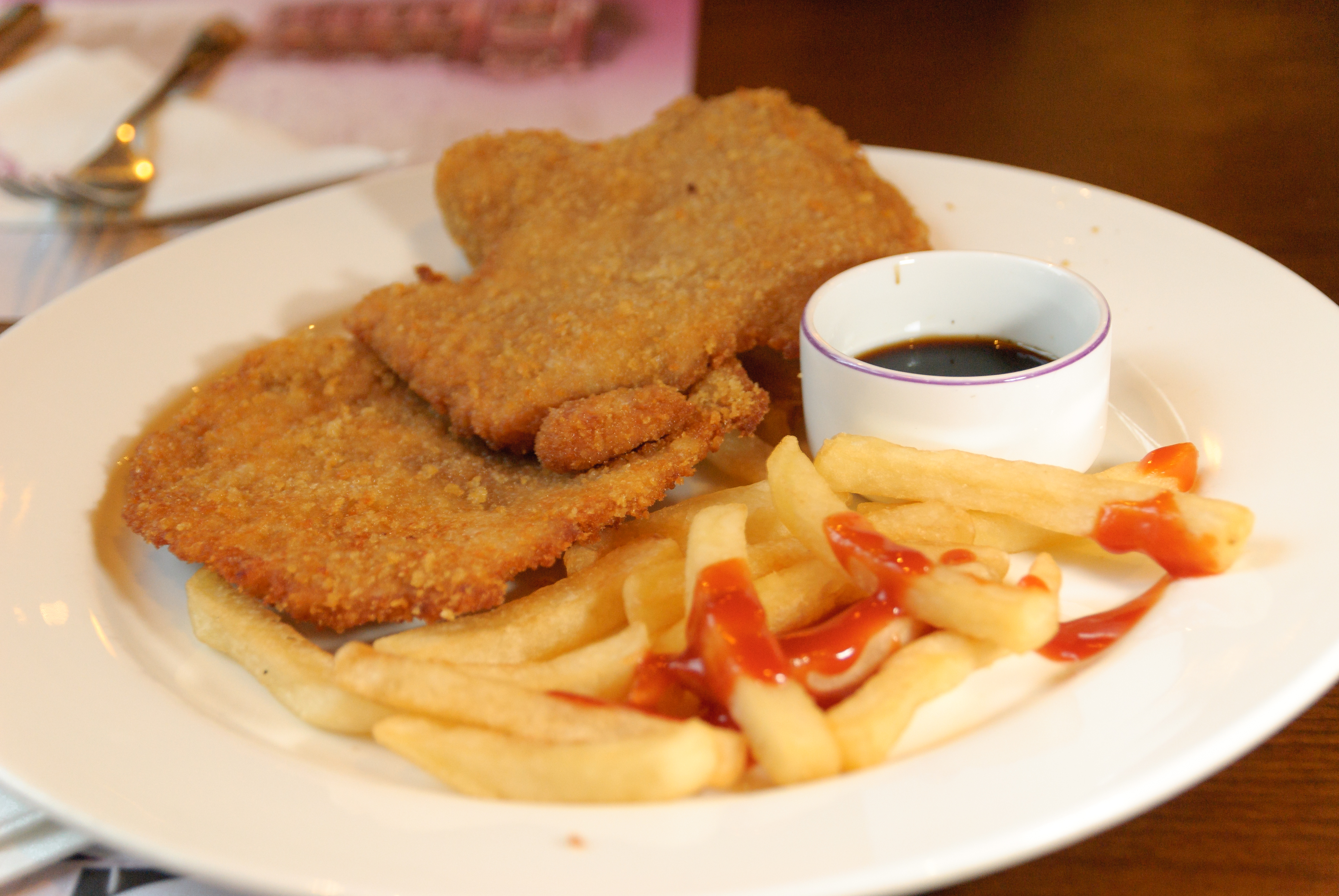
Fried pork chop

The Shanghai-style fried pork chop is a local variety of breaded cutlet. It is particularly popular as street food. Like in tonkatsu, the meat is tenderized and flattened by beating with the back of a knife. The pork chop is coated with bread crumbs before being fried to avoid it being too greasy, and to have a crispy exterior while maintaining a tender inside. Back in the old days when supplies were in short supply in Shanghai, soda crackers were crushed to replace bread crumbs, which produced a different unique flavor. In Shanghai, the pork chop is served with the local là jiàngyóu (Chinese: 辣酱油; lit. 'spicy soy sauce'), a localized version of the British Worcestershire sauce.

=== Potato salad ===
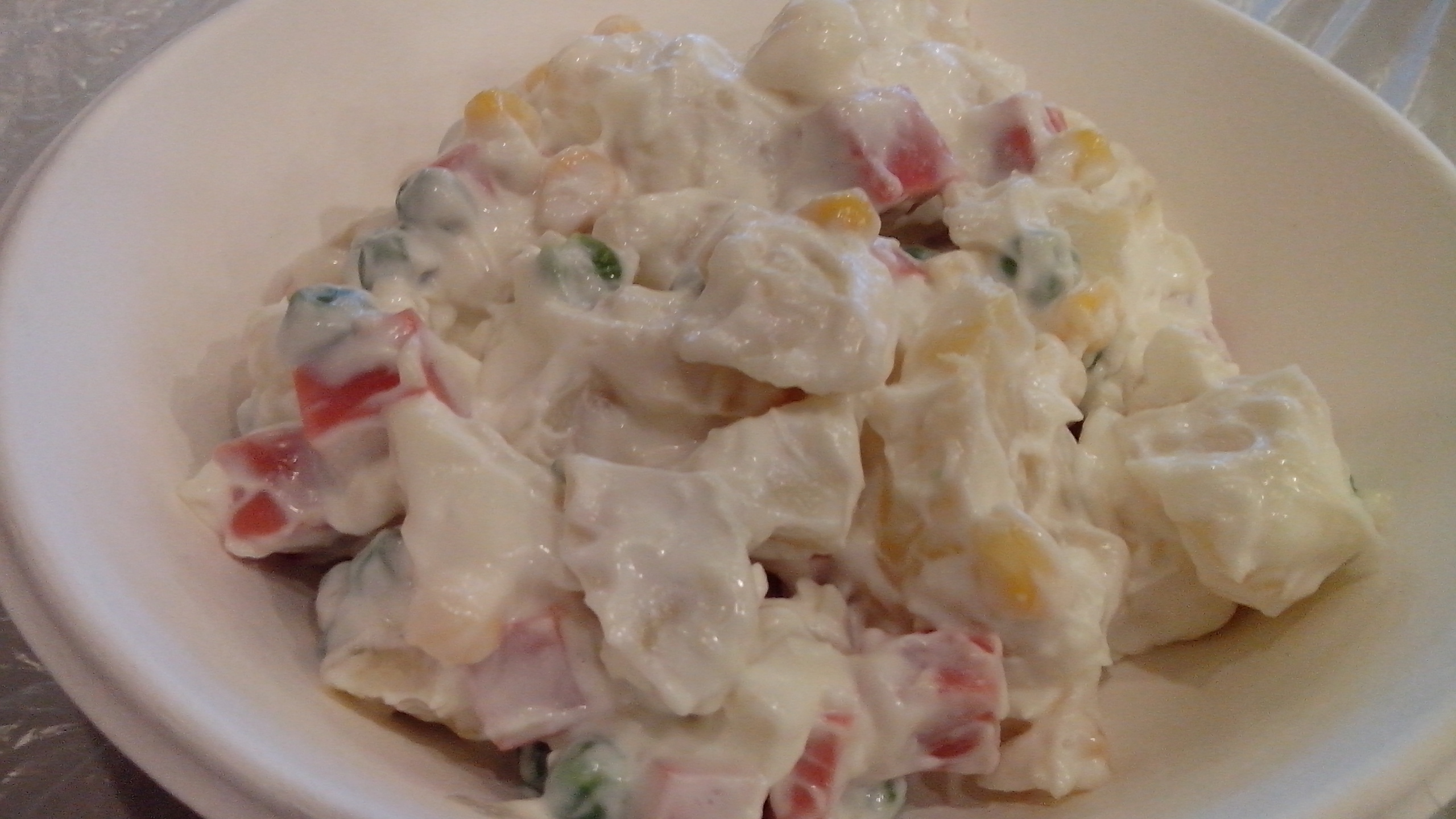
Potato salad

Usually known as Shanghai-style salad, the potato salad is a local variety of the Russian Olivier salad. It is made by mixing salad dressing and shredded boiled potatoes and diced sausages. It also goes with minced turnips and diced peas. Nowadays, most people make Shanghai-style salad using ready-made salad dressing bought from supermarkets, while originally the dressing was prepared by patiently mixing salad oil, egg yolks and mayonnaise for a long time.

== See also ==
- Yōshoku, Western-influenced cooking in Japan
- Cha chaan teng, Western-style cuisine of Hong Kong
