= Brunoise =

Culinary knife cut

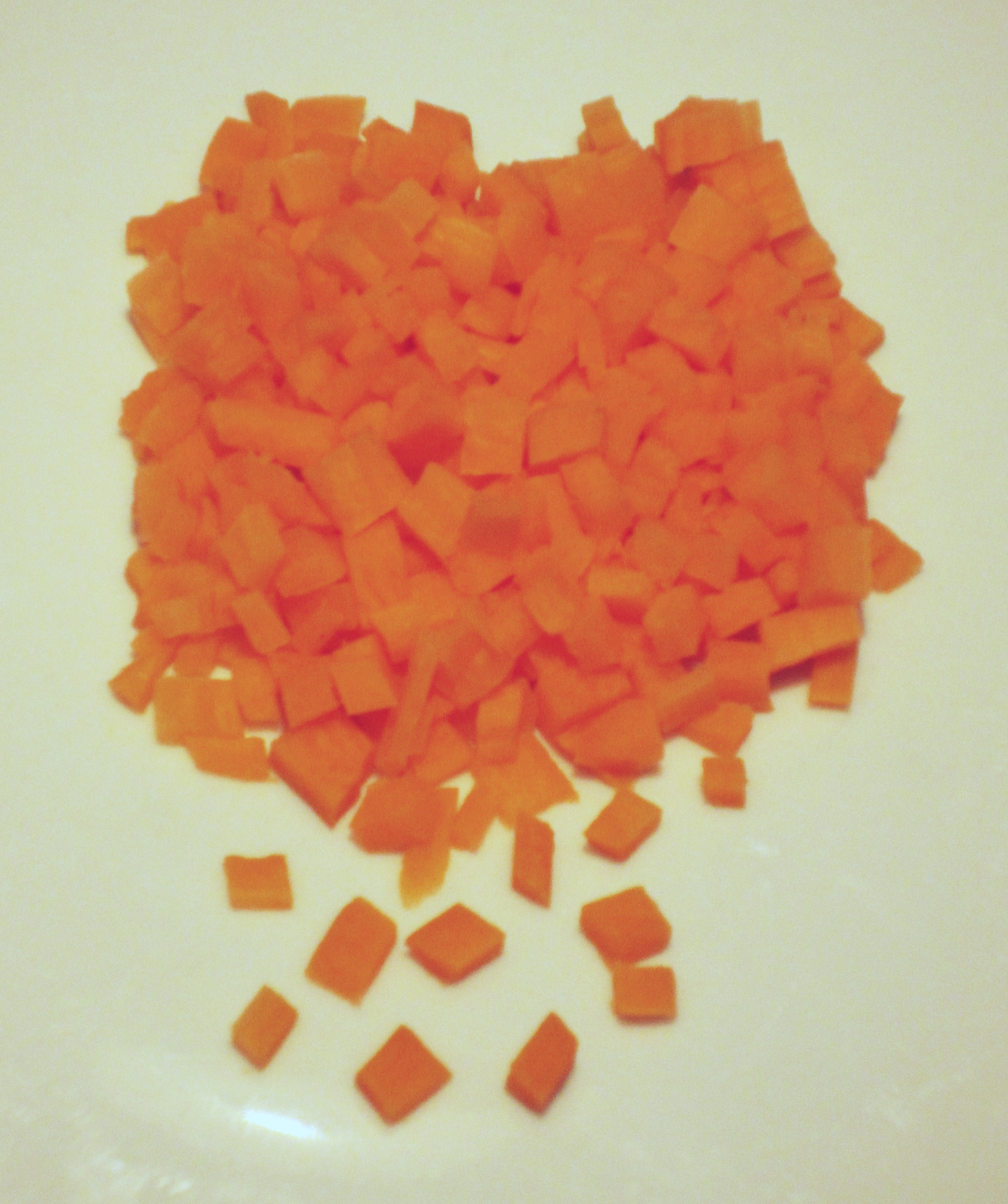
A pile of carrots brunoise

Brunoise (French pronunciation: [bʁynwaz]) is a culinary knife cut in which the food item is first julienned and then turned a quarter turn and diced, producing cubes of about 3 mm (1/8 in) or less on each side. In France, a "brunoise" cut is a smaller 1 to 2 mm. Some typical vegetables for a brunoise are carrots, celery, leeks, and turnips. The diced vegetables are blanched briefly in salty boiling water, then submerged in salted ice water for a few seconds to set the color. The brunoise is used as a garnish in many dishes; it is often used to garnish consommé. A typical brunoise should be consistent in size and shape, as this helps to create a pleasing and professional presentation. It is the smallest of the dice cuts.

A brunoise cut is also used in stocks and soups to rapidly increase the rate that flavours and aromas are transferred to the surrounding liquid. This is due to the increase in surface area over a traditional chopping method and is preferred for recipes that do not benefit from the texture of chopped vegetables.

== See also ==
- List of culinary knife cuts

== Sources ==
- Herbst, Sharon Tyler; Herbst, Ron (2013). The New Food Lover's Companion (5th ed.). Naperville, Illinois: Barron's Educational Series Inc. ISBN 978-1-4380-9233-1. LCCN 2013008951. OCLC 838195883.
