= Julienning =

Culinary technique

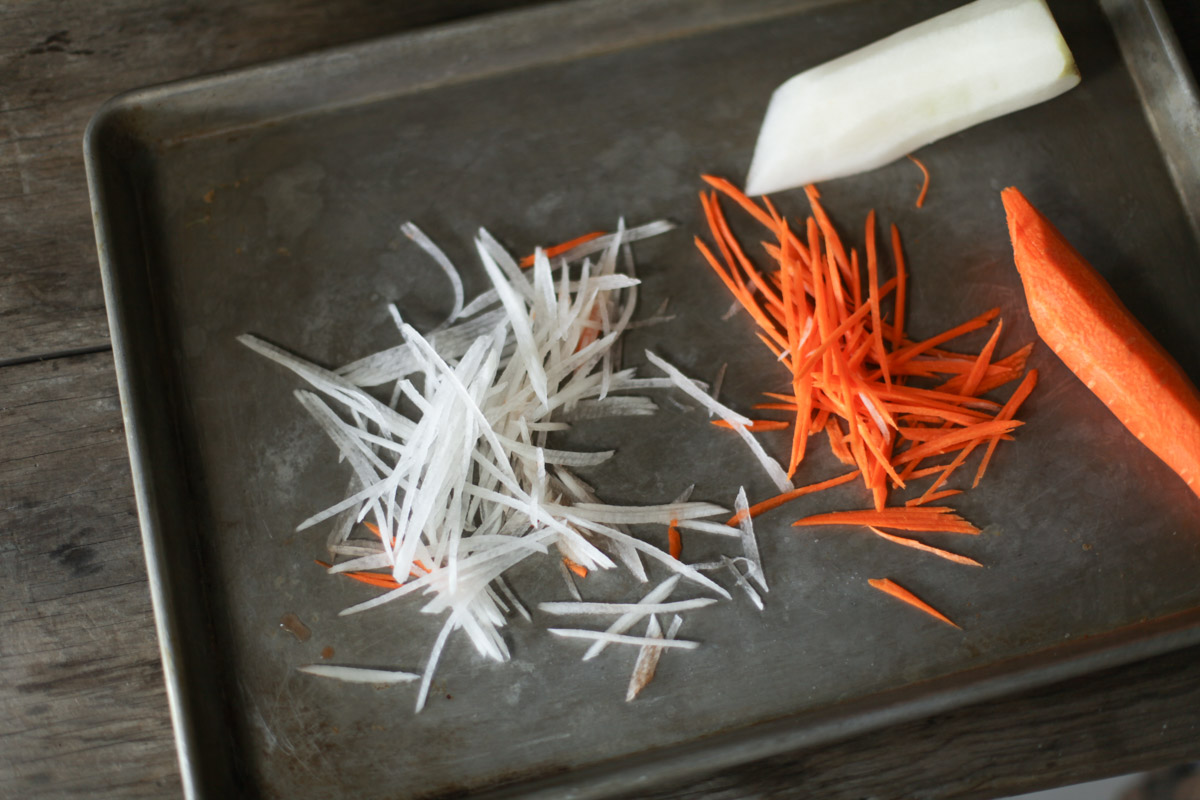
Julienned daikon radish and carrot

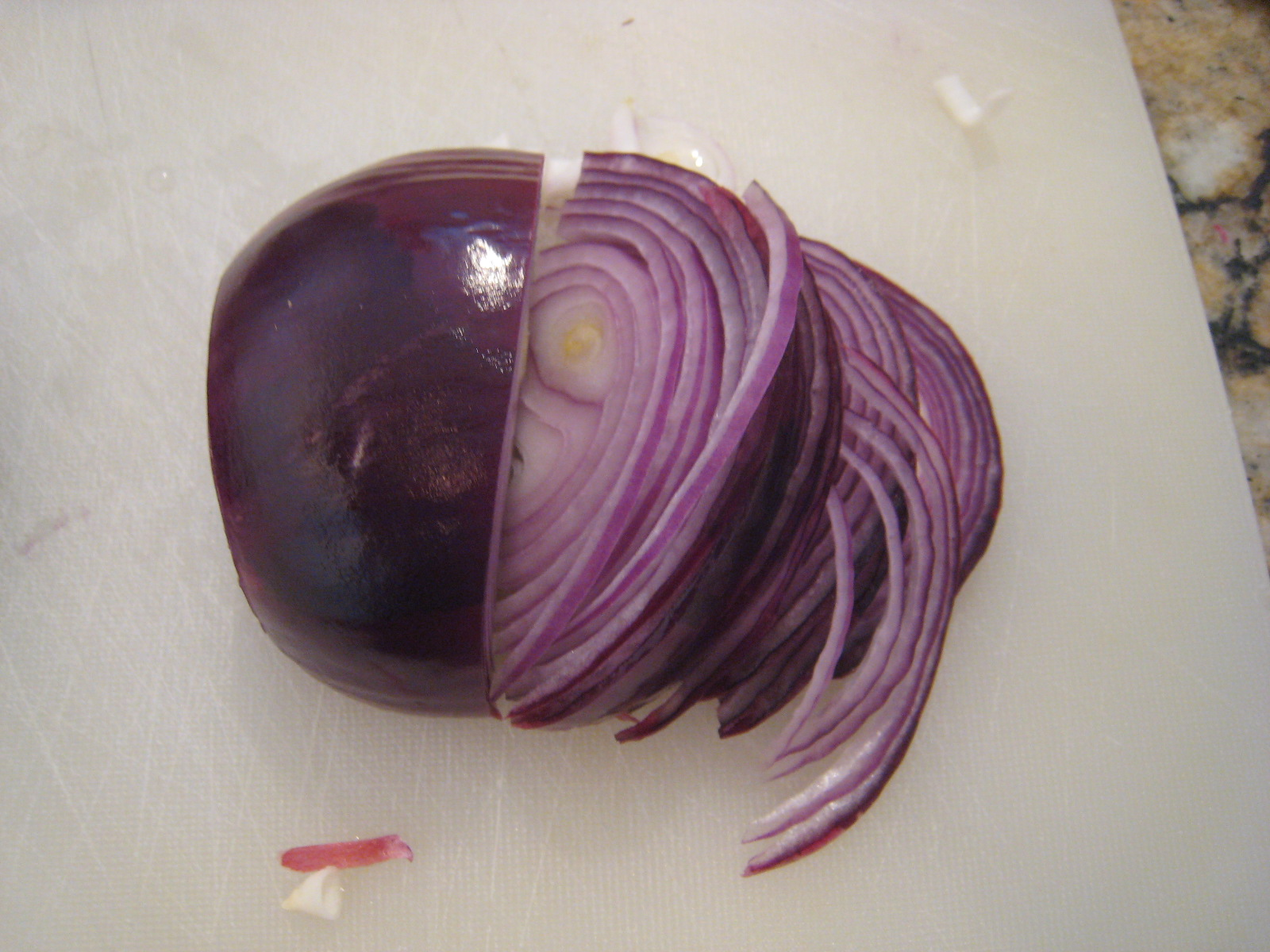
Red onion julienne for Peruvian ceviche

Julienne, allumette, or French cut is a culinary knife cut in which the food item is cut into long thin strips, similar to matchsticks. Common items to be julienned are carrots for carrots julienne, celery for céléris remoulade, potatoes for julienne fries, or cucumbers for naengmyeon.

Trimming the ends of the vegetable and the edges to make four straight sides makes it easier to produce a uniform cut. A uniform size and shape ensures that each piece cooks evenly and at the same rate. The measurement for julienne is 3 mm × 3 mm × 40 mm–50 mm (0.12 in × 0.12 in × 1.57 in–1.97 in). Once julienned, turning the subject 90 degrees and dicing finely will produce brunoise (3 mm × 3 mm × 3 mm (0.12 in × 0.12 in × 0.12 in)).

The first known use of the term in print is in François Massialot's Le Cuisinier Royal et Bourgeois (1722 edition). The origin of the term is uncertain.

== See also ==
- Mandoline
- Brunoise
- Chiffonade
