= Lucien Olivier =

Russian chef (1838–1883)

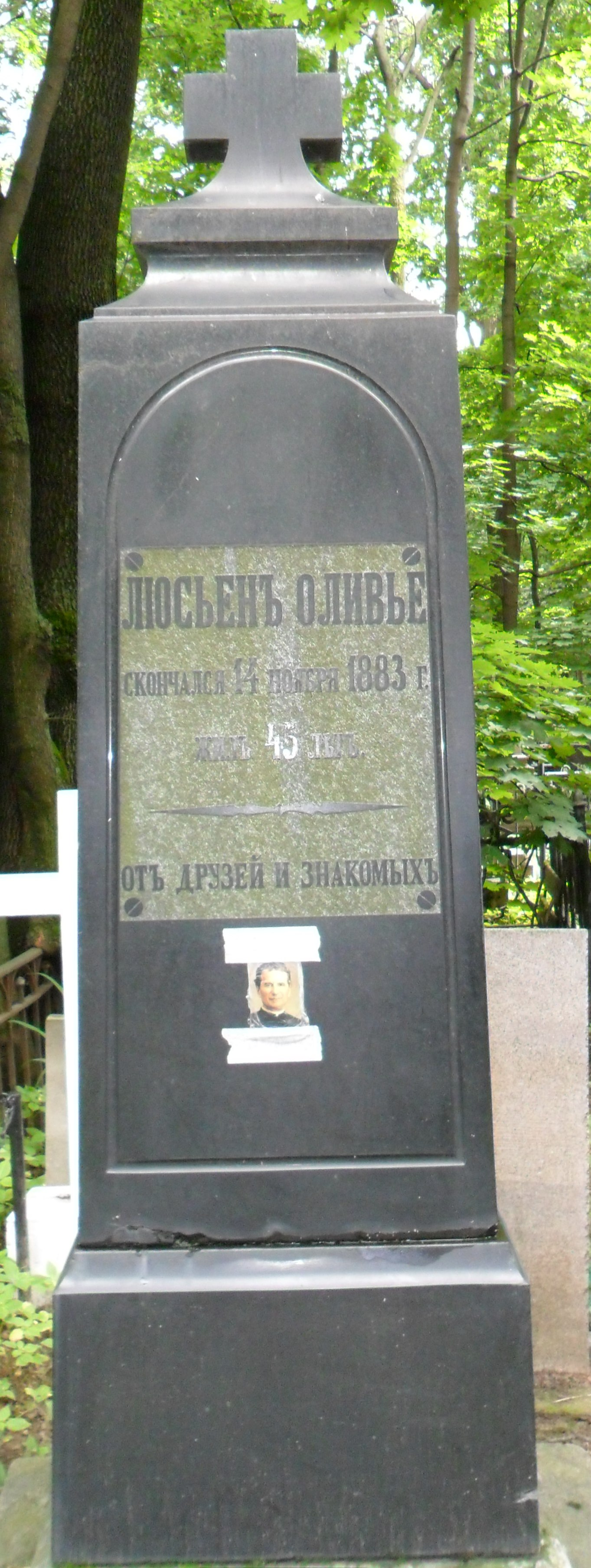
Olivier's tomb in Moscow

Lucien Olivier (Russian: Люсьен Оливье, romanized: Lyusyen Olivye; 1838 – 26 November [O.S. 14 November] 1883) was a Russian chef and restaurateur of Belgian and French descent.

He was the owner of the Hermitage Restaurant in the center of Moscow. The creation of Olivier salad is usually attributed to him.

== Career ==
Lucien Olivier was born in Moscow. Olivier is credited with the creation of Olivier salad, also known as Russian salad. The secret of the recipe was not disclosed until his death. Lucien Olivier died in Yalta from heart disease at the age of 45 in 1883 and was buried at Vvedenskoye Cemetery. His tomb was lost until 2008. The current salad has numerous variations which are a mixture of every component Olivier used to add to his famous dish, as well as ingredients that he did not use himself, with a mayonnaise dressing.
