= Olivier salad =

Russian traditional dish

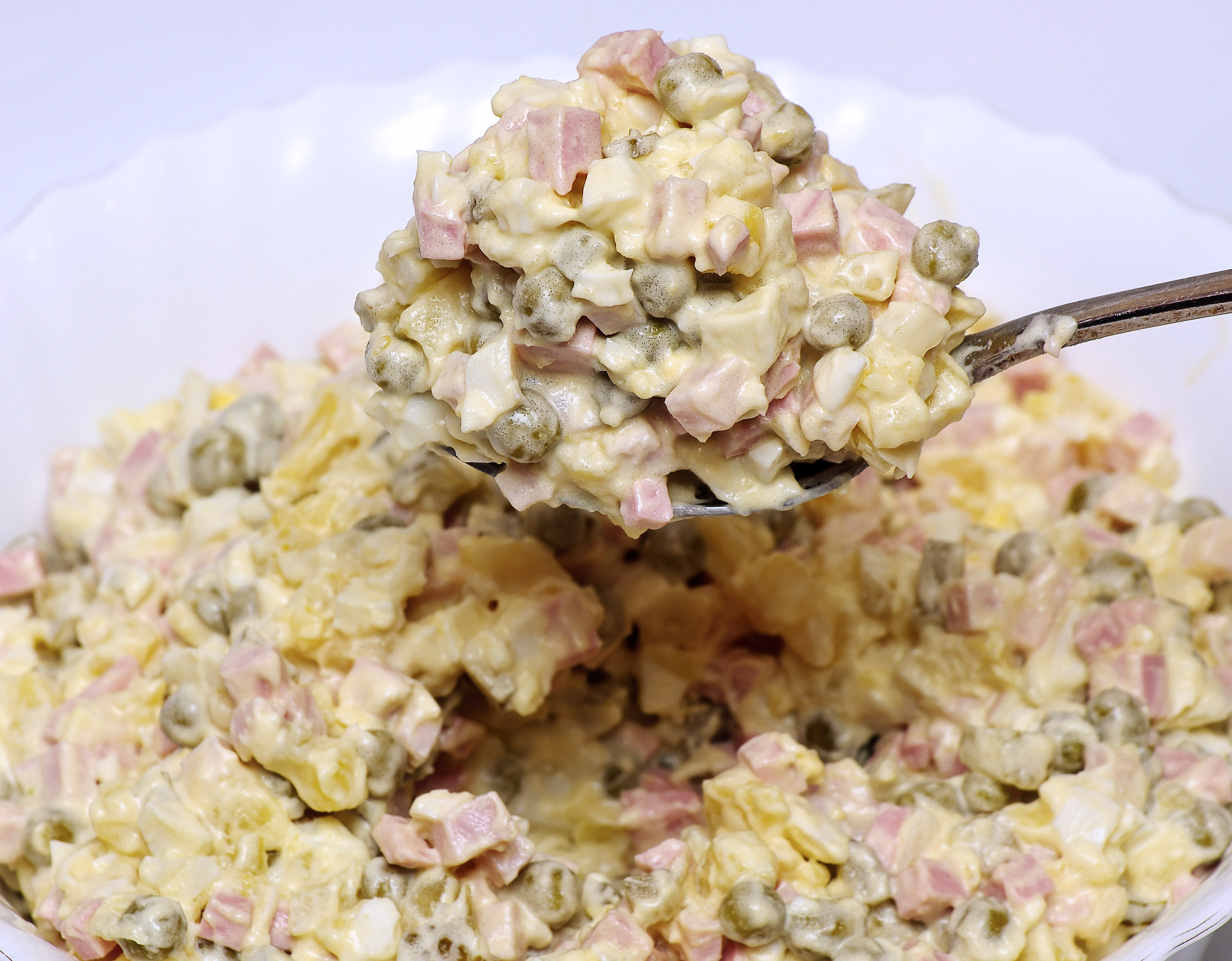
- Alternative names: Russian salad Stolichny salad
- Type: Salad
- Course: Zakuski
- Place of origin: Russia
- Created by: Lucien Olivier
- Main ingredients: Potatoes, vegetables, eggs, meat, mayonnaise

Olivier salad (Russian: салат Оливье, romanized: salat Olivye,), also known as Russian salad or Stolichny salad, is a traditional salad dish in Russian cuisine. Its creation is generally attributed to Lucien Olivier.

It is popular in the post-Soviet and other Eastern Bloc states around the world. In different modern recipes, it is usually made with diced boiled potatoes, carrots and brined dill pickles (or cucumber), together with optional eggs, vegetable or fruit ingredients such as green peas, celeriac, onions and apples, optional meat ingredients such as diced boiled chicken, cured sausage, ham, or hot dogs, with salt, pepper and mustard sometimes added to enhance flavor, and dressed with mayonnaise.

In Russia and other post-Soviet states, as well as in Russophone communities worldwide, the salad has become one of the main dishes on zakuski tables served during New Year's Eve (Novy God) celebrations. In Poland, it is commonly served at Christmas and Easter.

== Name ==
In many countries, the dish is commonly referred to as Russian salad or Stolichny salad. In Iran, it is referred to as سالاد اولیویه, Salad olivieh and is more commonly made with eggs and chicken. In a few Scandinavian countries (Denmark and Norway), it is called italiensk salat (Italian salad, to acknowledge the popularity of this dish in Northern Italy—where, however, the common name is insalata russa), and in Dutch, it is called huzarensalade (hussars' salad). In former Yugoslav countries, it is called руска салата (Russian salad). Francuska salata (French salad) is a similar dish. In Romania, it is known as salata (de) boeuf, which means "beef salad" in French. In France, it is referred to as macédoine de légumes, whereas the Polish version, in which there's usually no meat, is simply known as sałatka jarzynowa, or "vegetable salad".

== History ==
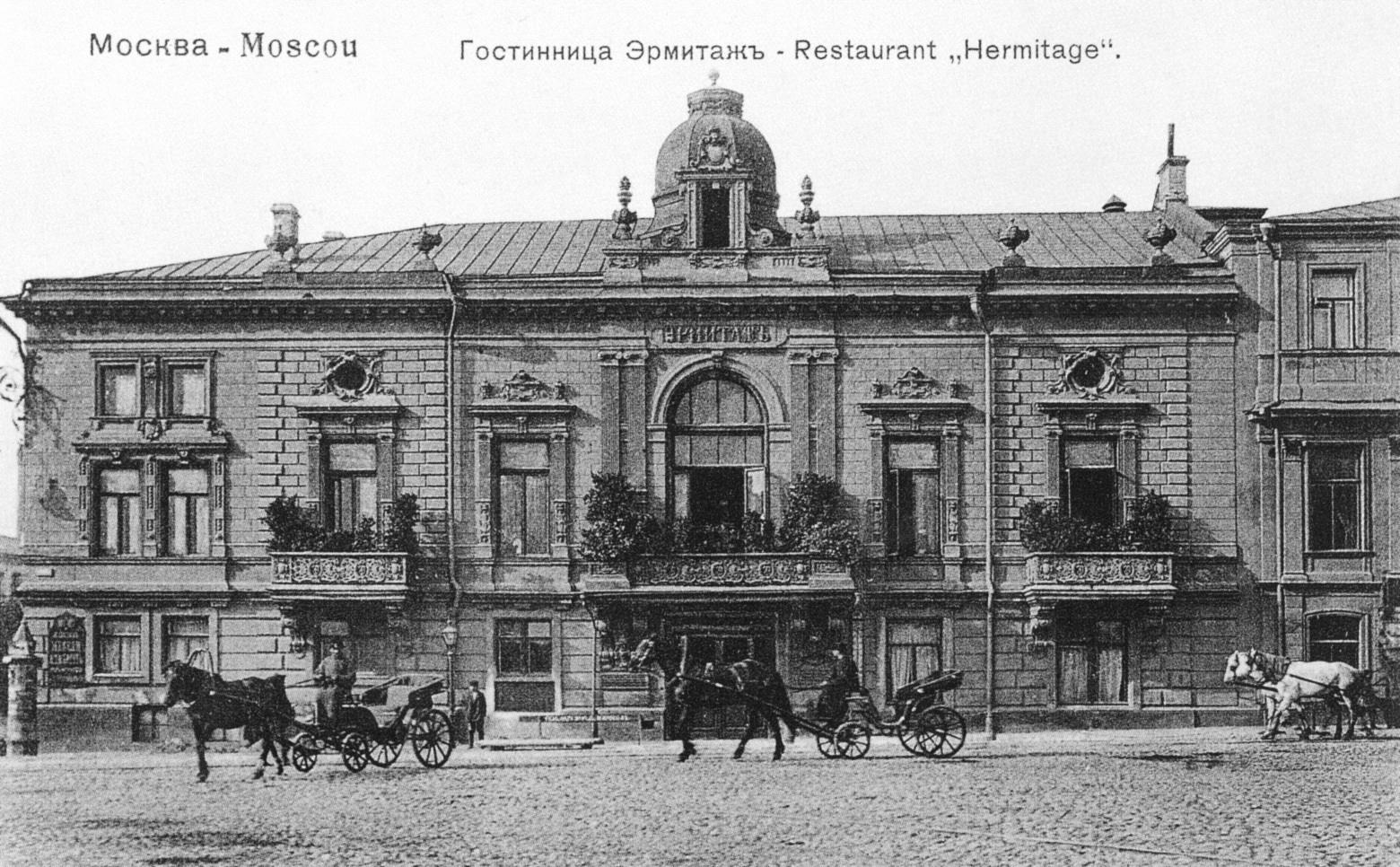
Hermitage restaurant in the 20th century

The original version of the salad was invented in the 1860s by a cook of French and Belgian origin, Lucien Olivier, the chef of the Hermitage, one of Moscow's most celebrated restaurants. Olivier's salad quickly became immensely popular with Hermitage regulars and became the restaurant's signature dish.

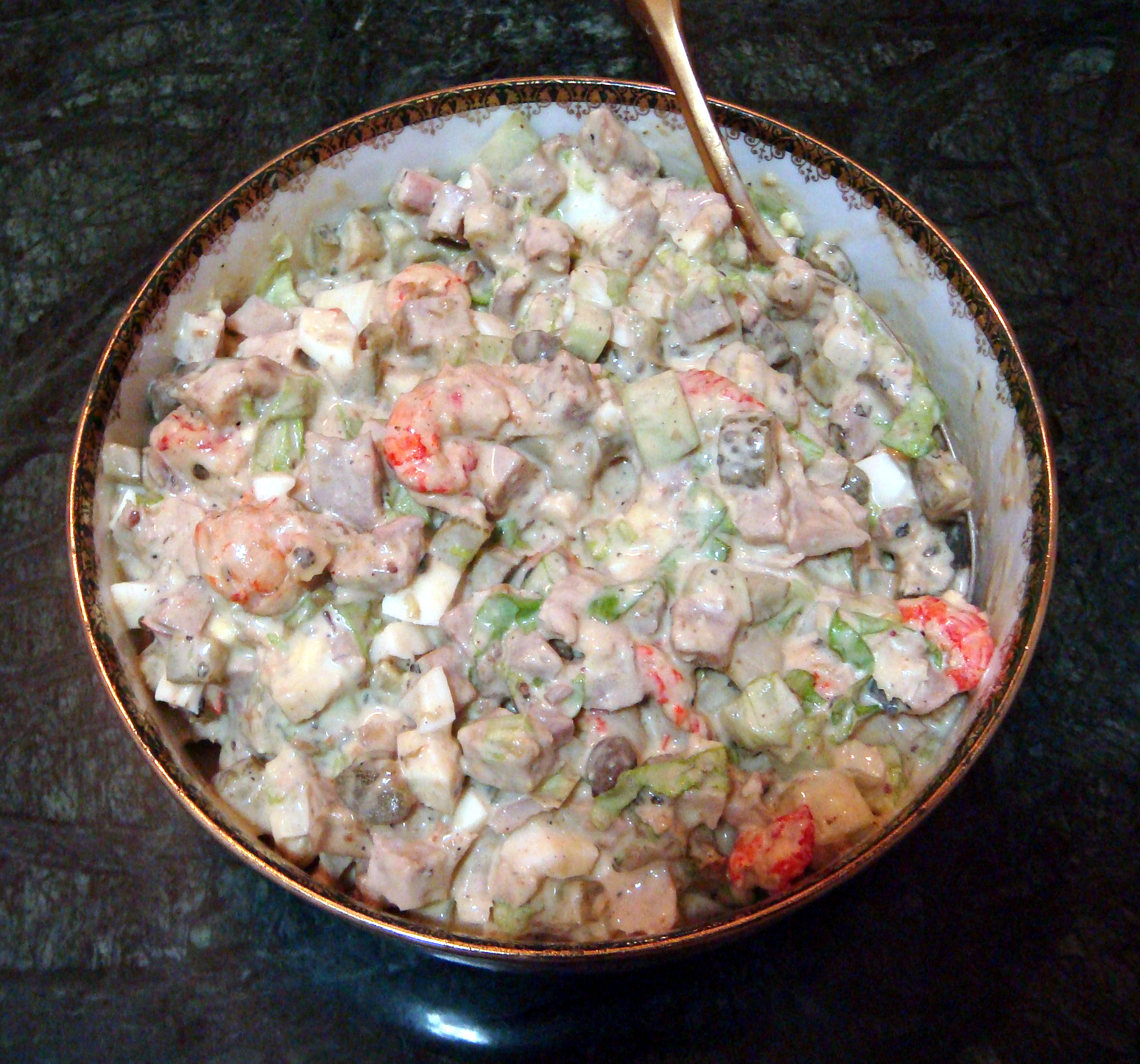
Olivier salad prepared with the Hermitage restaurant's recipe

At the turn of the 20th century, one of Olivier's sous-chefs, Ivan Ivanov, attempted to steal the recipe. While preparing the dressing one evening in solitude, as was his custom, Olivier was suddenly called away. Taking advantage of the opportunity, Ivanov sneaked into Olivier's private kitchen and observed his mise en place, which allowed him to make reasonable assumptions about the recipe of Olivier's famed dressing. Ivanov then left Olivier's employ and went to work as a chef for Moskva, a somewhat inferior restaurant, where he began to serve a suspiciously similar salad under the name "metropolitan salad" (Russian: Столичный, romanized: Stolichny). It was reported by the gourmets of the time, however, that the dressing on the "Stolichny" salad was of a lower quality than Olivier's.

Later, Ivanov sold the recipe for the salad to various publishing houses, which further contributed to its popularization. Due to the closure of the Hermitage restaurant in 1905, and the Olivier family's subsequent departure from Russia, the salad could now be referred to as "Olivier".

One of the first printed recipes for Olivier salad, by Aleksandrova, appearing in 1894, called for half a hazel grouse, two potatoes, one small cucumber (or a large cornichon), 3–4 lettuce leaves, 3 large crayfish tails, 1/4 cup cubed aspic, 1 teaspoon of capers, 3–5 olives, and 1 1/2 tablespoon Provençal dressing (mayonnaise).

As often happens with gourmet recipes which become popular, the ingredients which were rare, expensive, seasonal, or difficult to prepare were gradually replaced with cheaper and more readily available foods.

== Ingredients ==
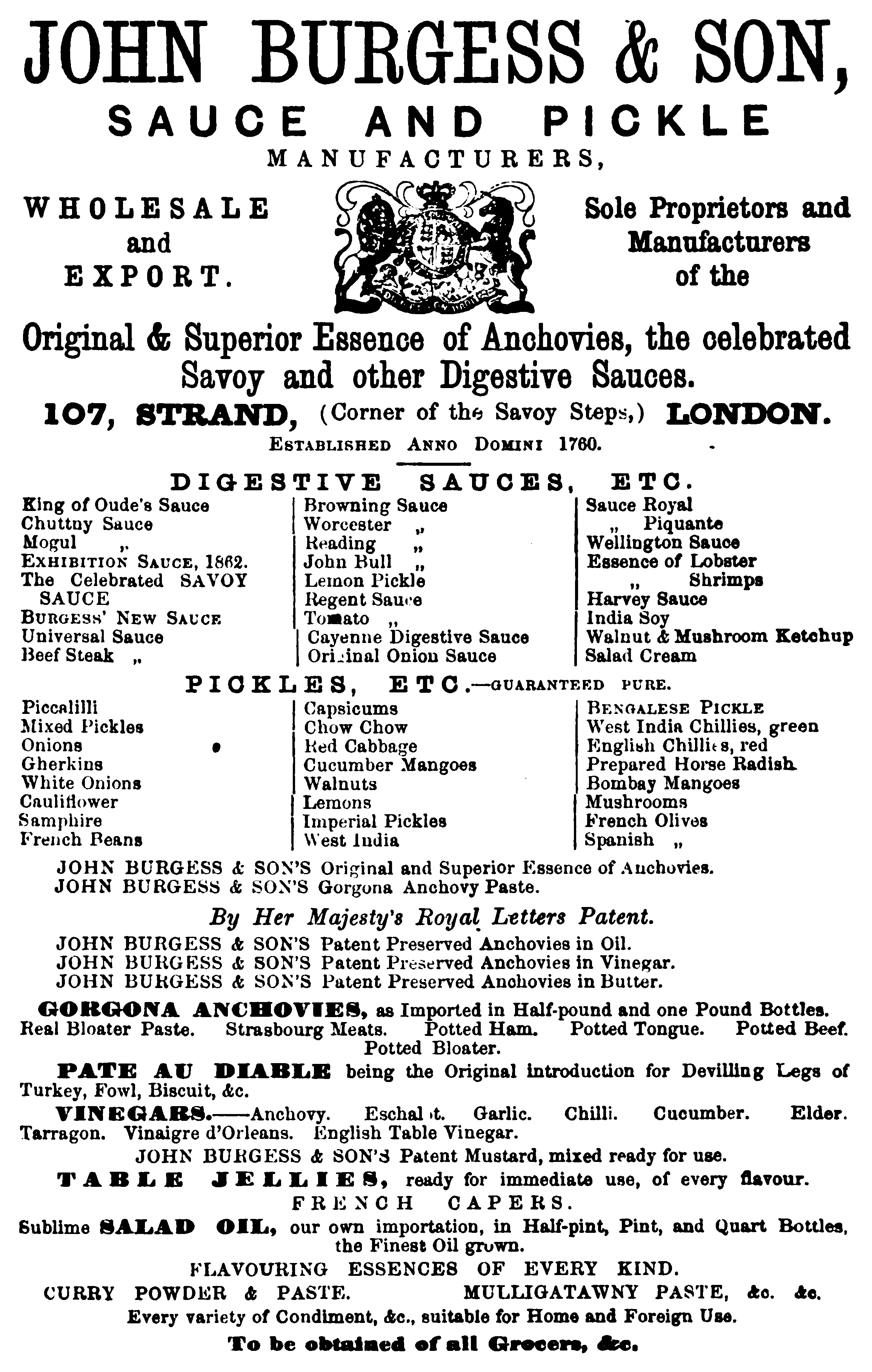
Advertisement for mogul sauce and other condiments by John Burgess & Son

The earliest published recipe known to date appeared in the Russian magazine Наша пища (Nasha pishcha 'Our Food') No. 6 (31 March 1894). This magazine, published from 1891 to 1896 and edited by M. Ignatiev, stated that the original recipe contained "mogul sauce" or "kabul sauce" (similar to Worcestershire sauce), manufactured by John Burgess & Son (Note: Now owned by the Greencore Group: "History". Greencore Group. Archived from the original on 2012-08-14.) (the brand he reputedly used) and Crosse & Blackwell.

The book Руководство к изучению основ кулинарного искусства (Rukovodstvo k izucheniyu osnov kulinarnogo iskusstva, 'Guide to the Study of the Fundamentals of Culinary Art') (1897) by P. Aleksandrova gave a recipe containing grouse, crayfish, potatoes, cucumber, lettuce, aspic, capers, olives and mayonnaise. The author wrote that veal, partridge or chicken could be substituted, but the authentic recipe contained grouse.

In post-revolutionary Russia, cheaper ingredients were substituted for the originals: grouse was replaced by chicken or sausage, crayfish by hard-boiled egg, cucumbers, olives and capers by pickled cucumbers and green peas.

Earlier, it always included cold meat such as ham or veal tongue, or fish. The mid-20th-century restaurant version involved not just vegetables, but also meats and other ingredients such as pickled tongue, sausage, lobster meat, and truffles, all garnished with, for example, capers and anchovy fillets. Some versions molded the salad in aspic.

In modern usage, the Olivier salad usually consists in large measure of boiled diced vegetables bound in mayonnaise, with Doktorskaya-type sausage. The most common alternative version, in which the sausage is replaced with boiled or smoked chicken, is called Stolichny salad, after Ivanov's version.

A multitude of other versions (named, unnamed, and even trademarked) exist, but only Olivier and Stolichny salad have entered the common vernacular of post-Soviet states.

== Modern Olivier ==
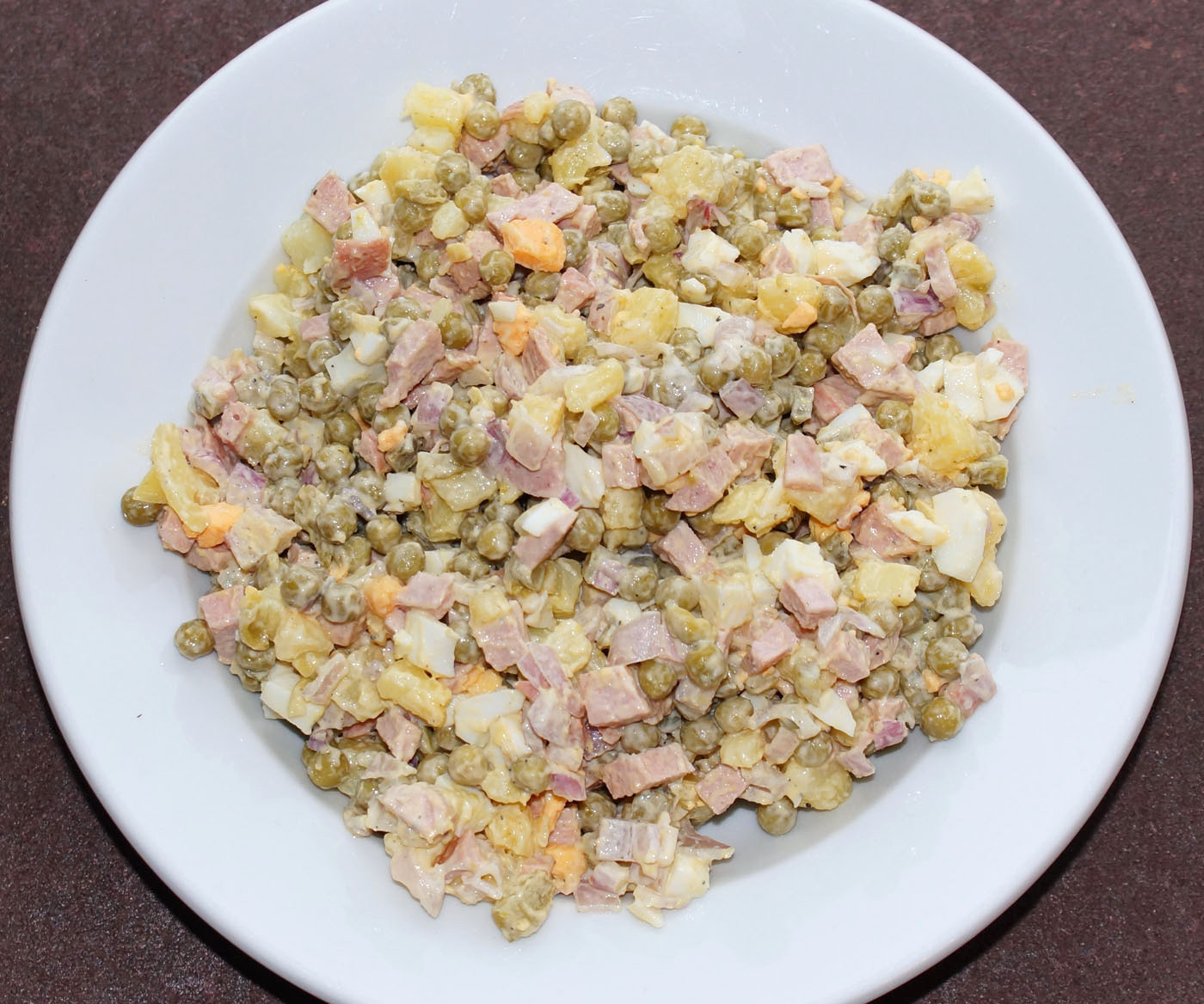
Typical Soviet-style Olivier salad

Today's popular version of Olivier salad—containing boiled potatoes, dill pickles or fresh cucumbers, peas, eggs, carrots, onion and boiled beef/chicken or bologna, dressed with mayonnaise—is a version of Ivanov's Stolichny salad, and only faintly resembles Olivier's original creation. This version was a staple of any Soviet holiday dinner, especially of a Novy God (New Year's Eve) dinner (to the extent that its presence was considered on a par with Soviet Champagne or mandarin oranges), due to availability of components in winter. Even though more exotic foods are widely available in Russia now, its popularity has hardly diminished: this salad was and maybe still is the most traditional dish for the home New Year celebration for Russian people.

Festive Russian and post-Soviet states' homemade versions are traditionally at the cook's whim. While some of the ingredients are considered to be basic and essential, others are either favoured or dismissed as a threat to supposed authenticity.

The biggest Olivier salad, weighing 1,841 kilograms (4,059 lb), was prepared in December 2012 in Orenburg.

=== Southeastern Europe ===
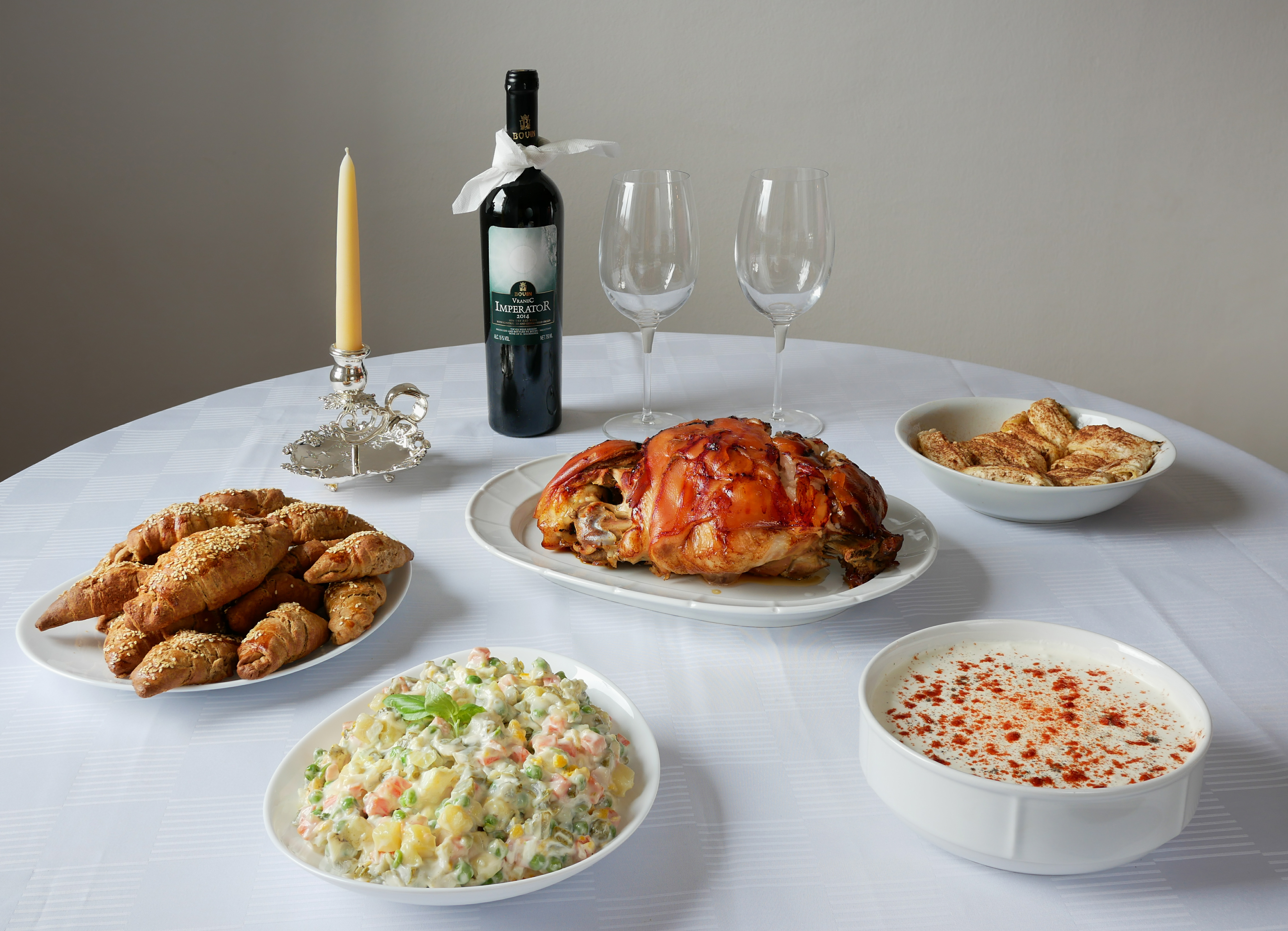
Serbian Christmas meal

In Serbia, Olivier salad is called "Russian salad" and is very common on the New Year and Christmas table. The salad is widely popular as руска салата (ruska salata) in Bulgaria, Serbia, and North Macedonia, and sallatë ruse in Albania. The Bulgarian version of the salad usually consists of potatoes, carrots, peas, pickles and some sort of salami or ham. In Bosnia and Herzegovina, both the ruska salata and francuska salata (which is essentially Russian salad prepared without meat) are very popular, especially during holidays.

In Croatia and Slovenia, it is typically prepared without meat, and is usually called francuska salata in Croatian and francoska solata in Slovene, both meaning 'French salad'. On top of the typical peas, corn and carrots, some Croatian varieties also contain diced apples.

The Romanian variant, called salată de boeuf ("beef salad"), is considered a traditional dish. It is a combination of finely chopped beef (or chicken) and root vegetables, folded in mayonnaise and finished with murături, traditional Romanian mixed pickles. It can also be made vegetarian.

In Turkey, it is known as rus salatası ("Russian salad"). The Turkish version consists of boiled and diced carrots and potatoes, sliced cucumber pickles, boiled peas and mayonnaise, and is sometimes decorated with boiled and sliced eggs, black olives and beetroot pickles. It is served as meze and is used as a filling for some sandwiches and kumpir (jacket potato). Another Turkish name for Olivier salad is Amerikan salatası 'American salad', a euphemistic misnomer originating from the Cold War period.

=== Eastern Europe ===
In Slovakia, it is called zemiakový šalát 'potato salad'. There are several versions; however, it typically consists of boiled and cubed vegetables (potatoes, carrots), finely chopped onions and pickles in a mayonnaise dressing, often with diced hard-boiled eggs and canned green peas. It is seasoned with salt, black pepper and mustard. Some fluid from the pickles may also be added.

In Czech, it is called simply bramborový salát 'potato salad'. It consists of boiled and cubed vegetables (potatoes, carrots, parsley and celery root), finely chopped onions and pickles in a mayonnaise dressing, often with diced hard-boiled eggs, some kind of soft salami and canned green peas. It is the side-dish of choice to go with schnitzel or breaded carp, staple Christmas meals in the Czech Republic.

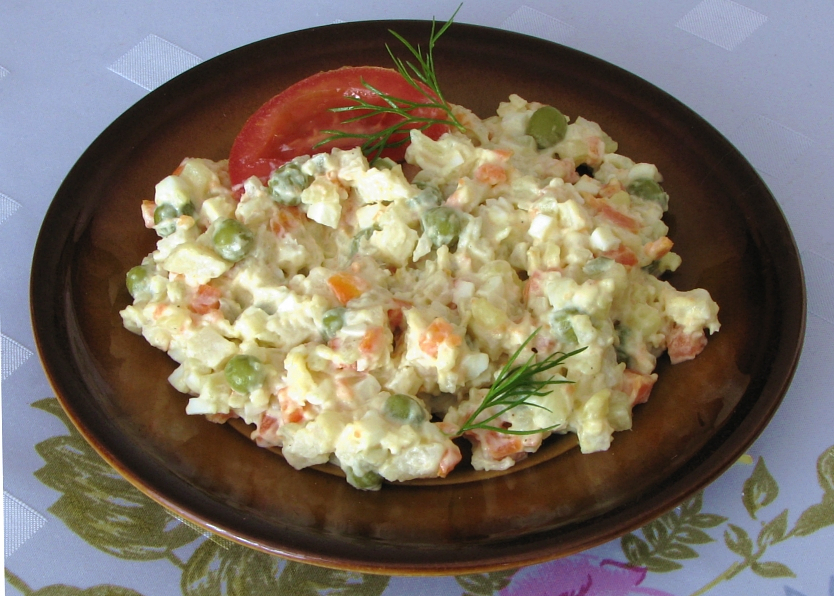
Sałatka jarzynowa, Poland

Polish sałatka jarzynowa or sałatka warzywna ('vegetable salad', often simply called sałatka) is vegetarian, consisting of peas, hard boiled eggs, and the mirepoix, always cut into small cubes, seasoned with mayonnaise, salt, pepper. Recipes usually vary by region (tart apples or pickles can be added) and even by household, sometimes even adding meat (e.g. ham). One such notable exception is szałot (Polish pronunciation: [ˈʂawɔt]), a Silesian variety which may include not only boiled potatoes, carrots, peas and boiled eggs, but also bacon, sausages or pickled herring. Such salads are often served on family celebrations, in particular on Christmas Eve.

In Hungary, the meatless version is called franciasaláta 'French salad'. Versions with meat added are called orosz hússaláta 'Russian meat salad'. With or without meat, it is a popular food all year round.

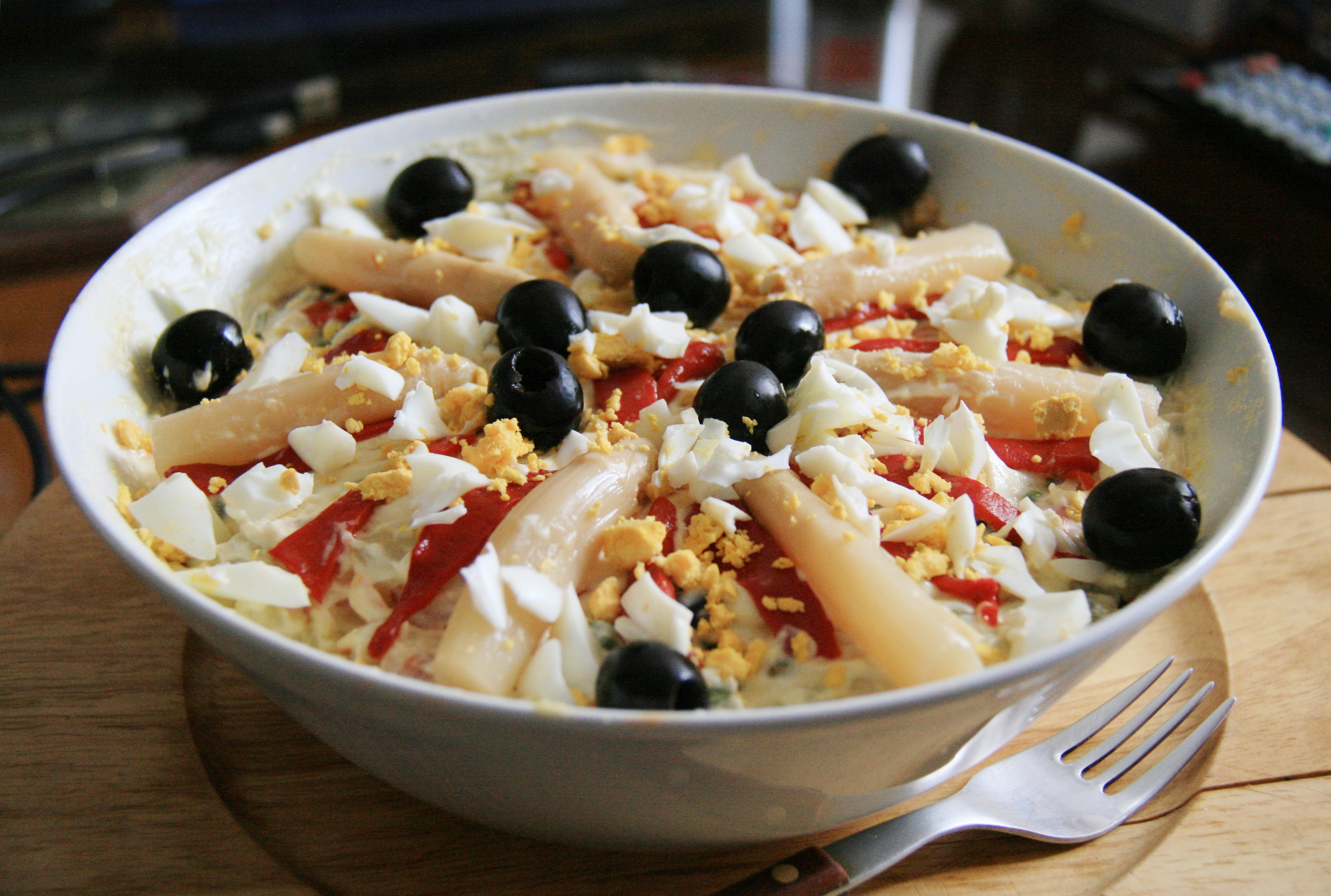
Ensaladilla rusa, Madrid, Spain

=== Southern Europe ===
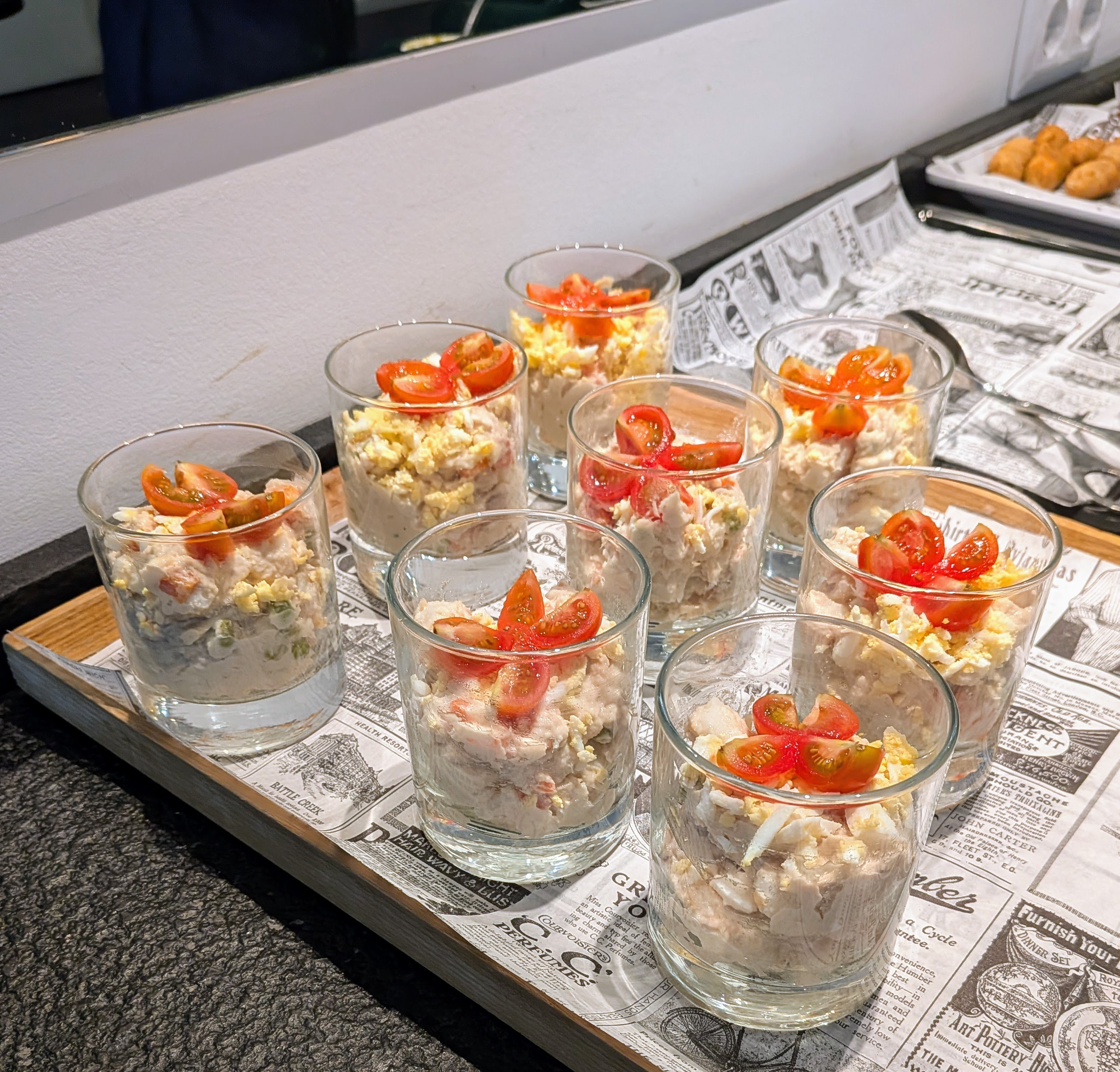
Russian salad in Barcelona - with tuna

In Greece, it can be found on almost any restaurant's menu and is called ρώσικη σαλάτα rossiki salata; it usually contains no meat. Ensaladilla rusa 'Russian little salad' is widely consumed in Spain and it is served as a tapa in many bars. It typically consists of minced boiled potato, minced boiled carrots, canned tuna, minced boiled eggs, peas, and mayonnaise. In Italy insalata russa more often has only vegetables (carrots, peas and potatoes) and mayonnaise. A similar version is also popular in Portugal, where it is called salada russa. It is usually served either as a standalone dish or as a garnish to fish dishes, particularly fish fillets.

=== Northern Europe ===
In Norway, it is called russisk salat, and contains carrots and green peas in mayonnaise dressing. It may also include small shrimp. Often the salad is paired with smoked meat on bread. A similar but distinct salad known as italiensk salat is also available in Scandinavian countries, consisting of shredded cabbage and carrots in a mayonnaise dressing. Russisk salat and italiensk salat are often confused. In Finland, the regional salad italiansalaatti contains carrots, peas and ham in mayonnaise dressing but replaces potatoes with spaghetti or macaroni. In the Netherlands, there is a similar salad called huzarensalade 'hussar salad', but this salad already existed in the 1840s. Its name probably derives from the Dutch hussar regiments, and refers to the original ingredient of horsemeat.

=== Asia ===
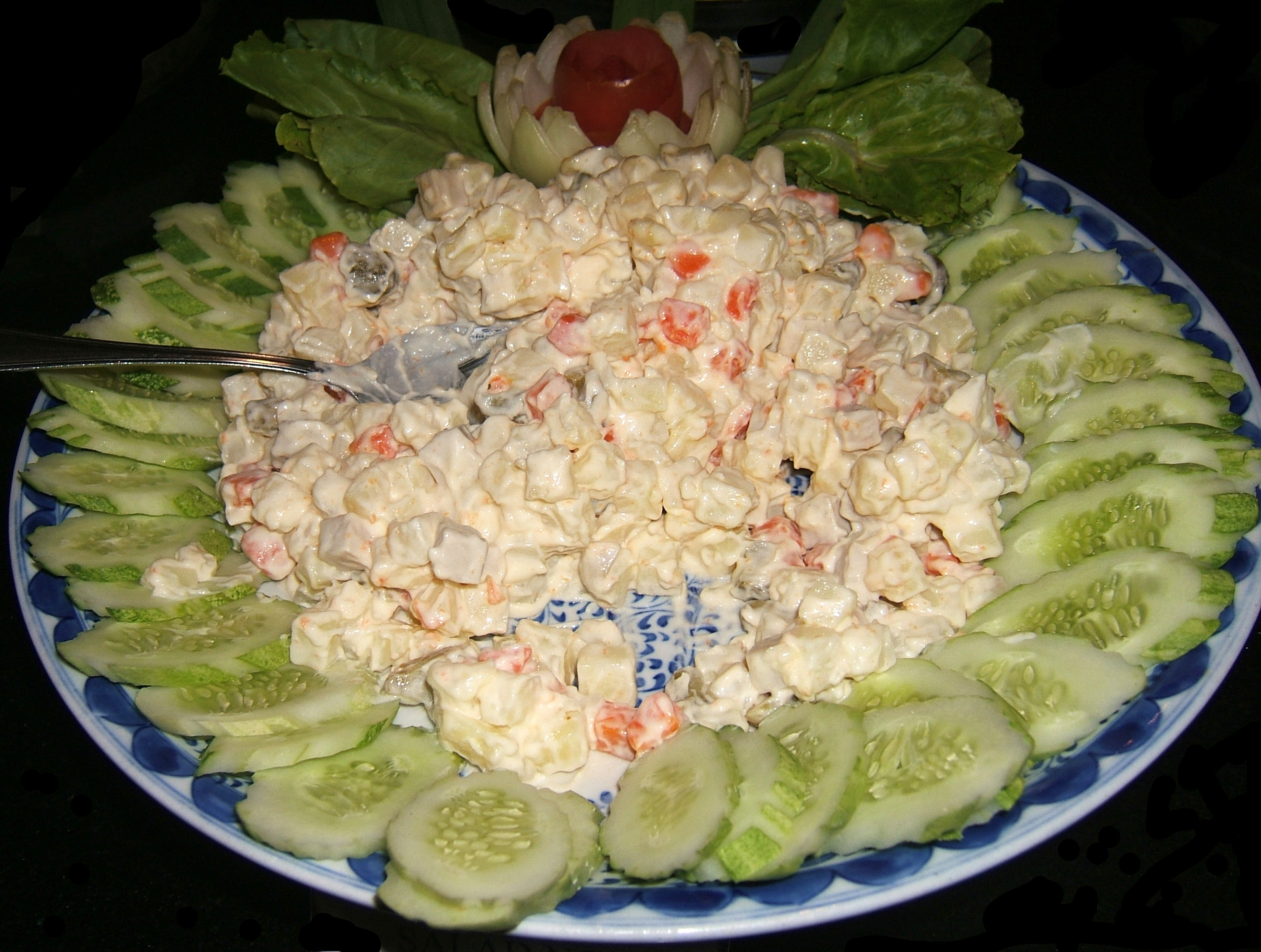
Russian salad, Hanoi, Vietnam

Olivier salad (Persian: سالاد الیویه, sâlâd-e olivier) is a common side dish in Iran, where it is known as sâlâd-e Olivier (Olivier salad) and usually made with potatoes, eggs, Persian pickled cucumbers, carrots, chicken, peas and mayonnaise; it is a frequently used sandwich filler.

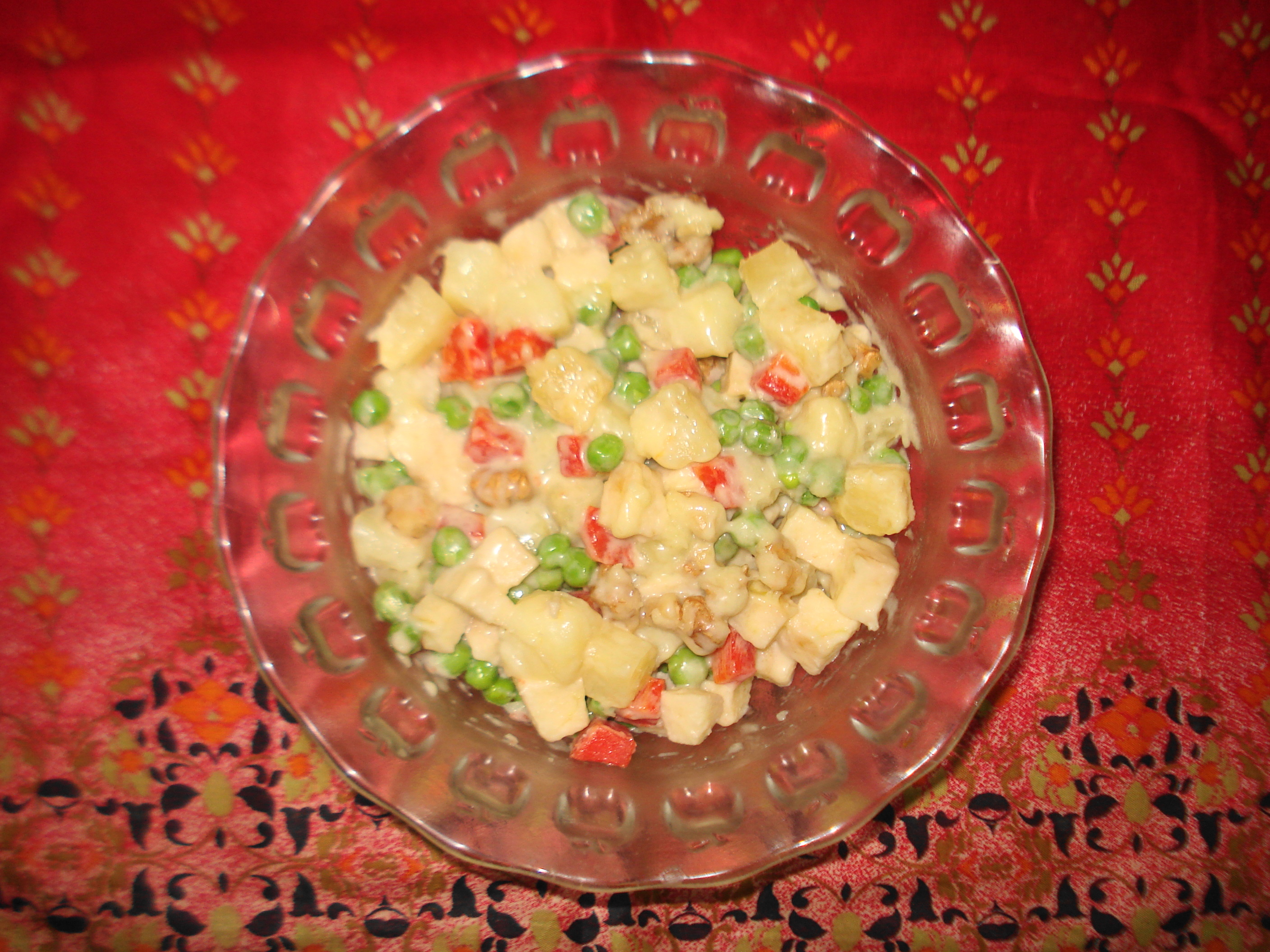
Russian salad, Karachi, Pakistan

It is also well known in Vietnam, Bangladesh, Pakistan, and India as well, where it is usually made with potatoes, peas, apples or pineapples, and mayonnaise, and is frequently served as a side dish in cafes.

Japanese potato salad (potesara, ポテサラ), is often said to be a yoshoku version of the Olivier salad, differing in semi-mashed consistency of the potato, chopped ham as a main meat ingredient (instead of traditional poultry) and a liberal use of rice vinegar and karashi mustard in its dressing.

Olivier salad is believed to have been introduced as a "Capital salad" or "Niislel salad" in Mongolia during the Soviet period. It usually consists of minced ham, minced boiled eggs, minced boiled carrots, and potatoes dressed with mayonnaise. It is widely served amongst Mongolians, especially during the festive seasons.

In the early 20th century, a large number of Russians lived in Shanghai. They were called Shanghai Russians and formed the largest European groups living in Shanghai. As a result, Olivier salad became a common household dish among local Chinese living in the city center of Shanghai. It is called Shanghai-style salad and is one of the most popular dishes in Haipai cuisine, a Western-style cooking that is unique to Shanghai. The traditional Shanghai variation of Olivier salad consists of potatoes, egg whites and a type of sausage similar to the Polish kielbasa sausage, but produced locally in Shanghai and similar to the sausage with the same Chinese name produced in Harbin, China. Sometimes apples or green peas are added to the salad. Egg yolk is used to make mayonnaise for the salad dressing. Over time, new variations evolved with additional ingredients added or with different salad dressing used.

=== Latin America ===
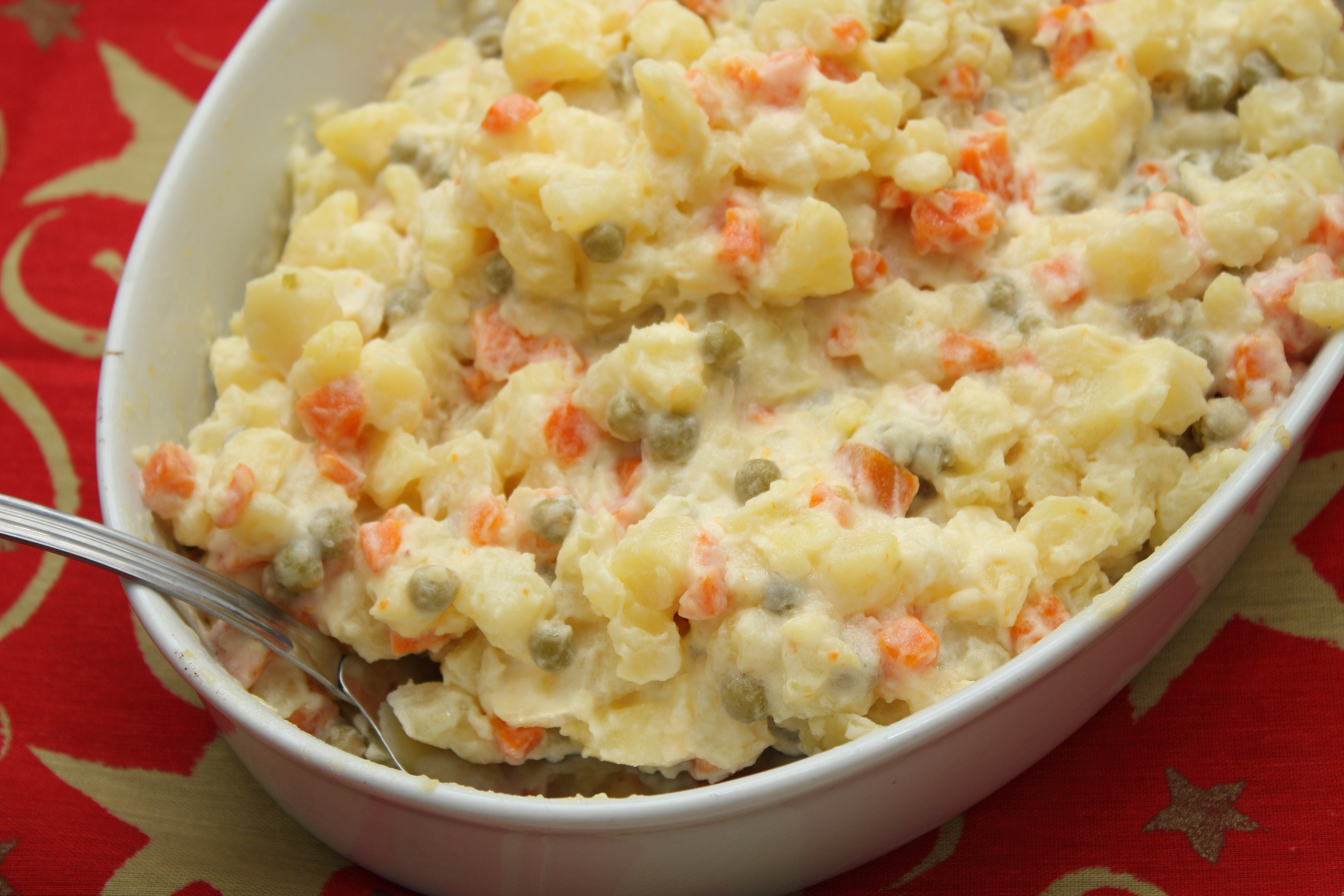
Argentinian ensalada rusa

The dish is also common in many Latin American countries where it is called ensalada rusa and has been reduced to its minimum: minced boiled potatoes and carrots, green beans and mayonnaise-based dressing. In Argentina, it is usually served on its own as a first course, or with a very thinly sliced beef wrapping called matambre, in a dish called matambre con rusa. Argentines of Eastern European Jewish origin may make the salad with tuna. In Peru, Chile, Colombia, Venezuela and Argentina, it is a traditional Christmas side dish. In the Dominican Republic, the dish is made with diced boiled vegetables including beets, carrots, potatoes and sometimes corn, mixed with mayonnaise and spices. It is often served as a side dish. The version most frequently prepared and served in Brazil is similar to that in other Latin American countries, and often called simply maionese.

== See also ==
- List of chicken dishes
- List of Russian dishes
- List of salads
- Chicken salad
- Egg salad
- Mimosa salad
- Potato salad

== Sources ==
- Ayto, John (2013). "Russian salad". The Diner's Dictionary. Oxford University Press. ISBN 978-0-19-964024-9.
- Davidson, Alan; Jaine, Tom (2006). "Russia". The Oxford Companion to Food. Oxford University Press. ISBN 978-0-19-280681-9.
- Goldstein, Darra (1999). "Russian salad". A Taste of Russia: A Cookbook of Russian Hospitality. Russian Information Service. ISBN 978-1-880100-42-4.
