= Shanghai Russians =

Ethnic group in China

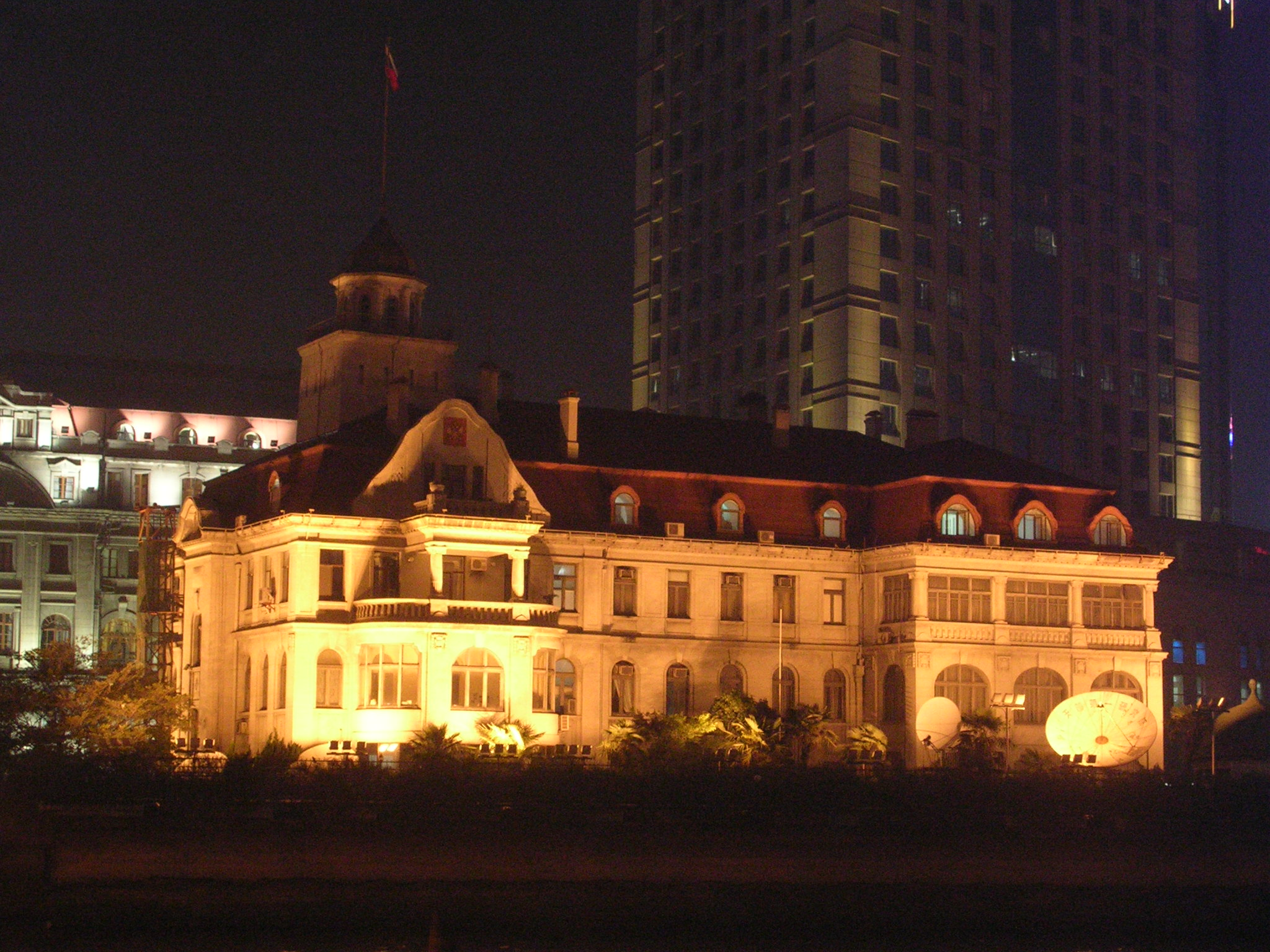
The Russian Consulate-General by Suzhou Creek.

The Shanghai Russians, a sizable part of the Russian diaspora, flourished in Shanghai, China, during the interwar period of the early 20th century. Up to 25,000 Russians were estimated to have lived in the city by 1937; they formed the largest European group there by far. Most of them had come from the Russian Far East, where, with the support of the Japanese, the Whites had maintained a presence as late as the autumn of 1922.

== Background ==
In the late 19th century, the Russian imperial government was shifting the focus of its investment to northeast China. It developed the Chinese Eastern Railway first in Heilongjiang linking Harbin to Vladivostok, and later to Port Arthur on the Liaodong Peninsula. As a consequence, China's trade with its northern neighbour soared. As soon as there was a regular ferry service between Vladivostok and Shanghai, the Russian tea merchants started to settle in the commercial capital of China. About 350 Russian citizens resided within the Shanghai International Settlement in 1905. In order to protect their interests, the Russian consulate was opened in 1896. The old building of the consulate, still occupied by the Russian diplomats, ranks among the Bund's minor landmarks.

The bulk of the Russian exile community relocated to Shanghai from Vladivostok following the fall of the Provisional Priamurye Government at the close of the Russian Civil War. Admiral Oskar Victorovich Stark's squadron alone brought several thousand White Russians from Vladivostok in 1922. Many Harbin Russians, attracted by Shanghai's booming economy, moved to the Shanghai International Settlement over the following years. Barred by both distance and money from joining established communities in Paris and Berlin, a large number gravitated towards Shanghai, a free port requiring no visa or work-permit for entry. For this same reason it was later to become a refuge for Jews fleeing the Nazis.

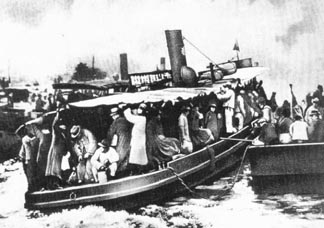
A group of Russian émigrés arriving in Shanghai. A photograph from the newspaper Shankhaiskaya zarya, 23 February 1930.

== Living conditions ==
Although free, and relatively secure, émigrés found conditions far from ideal. For one thing they were all stateless, as the Soviet government had revoked the citizenship of all political exiles in 1921. The only travel document most of them had was the Nansen passport, issued by the League of Nations. Unlike other foreigners in China they did not have the benefits conferred by extraterritoriality, which granted immunity from local laws. If arrested, they would be tried under Chinese law.

Employment in this international city required a good command of English or French as a minimum requirement. Whole families depended on wives or daughters who made a living as taxi dancers (hired dancing partners). A survey by the League of Nations in 1935 reportedly found that some 22% of Shanghai Russian women between 16 and 45 years of age were to some extent engaging in prostitution.

Some found professional work, such as teaching music or French. Other women took work as dressmakers, shop assistants and hairdressers. Many men became career soldiers of the Shanghai Russian Regiment, the only professional/standing unit within the Shanghai Volunteer Corps. Gradually, and despite many difficulties, the community not only gained a good deal of cohesion but began to flourish, both economically and culturally. By the mid-1930s there were two Russian schools, as well as a variety of cultural and sporting clubs. There were Russian-language newspapers and a radio station. An important part was also played by the local Russian Orthodox Church under the guidance of St. John of Shanghai and San Francisco.

The cover of Vladimir Zhiganov's album The Russians in Shanghai (1936)

Many exiles set up restaurants in the district known as Little Russia (around the Avenue Joffre, now Middle Huaihai Road, in the French Concession), contributing to the development of the local Western-style Haipai cuisine. Russian musicians (such as Oleg Lundstrem) achieved a dominance over the city's foreign-run orchestra. The most famous Russian singer, Alexander Vertinsky, relocated from Paris to Shanghai; and Fyodor Chaliapin appeared on tour. Vladimir Tretchikoff, the "King of Kitsch", spent his youth in the city. Russian teachers offered lessons in theatre and dancing. Margot Fonteyn, the English ballerina, studied dance in Shanghai as a child with Russian masters, one of whom, George Gontcharov, had danced with the Bolshoi in Moscow.

Russian women with their dancing and other contributions to the entertainment industry gave the city the exotic reputation noted in the guidebooks of the day. A fictionalized portrayal of their predicament is presented in the James Ivory film The White Countess (2005).

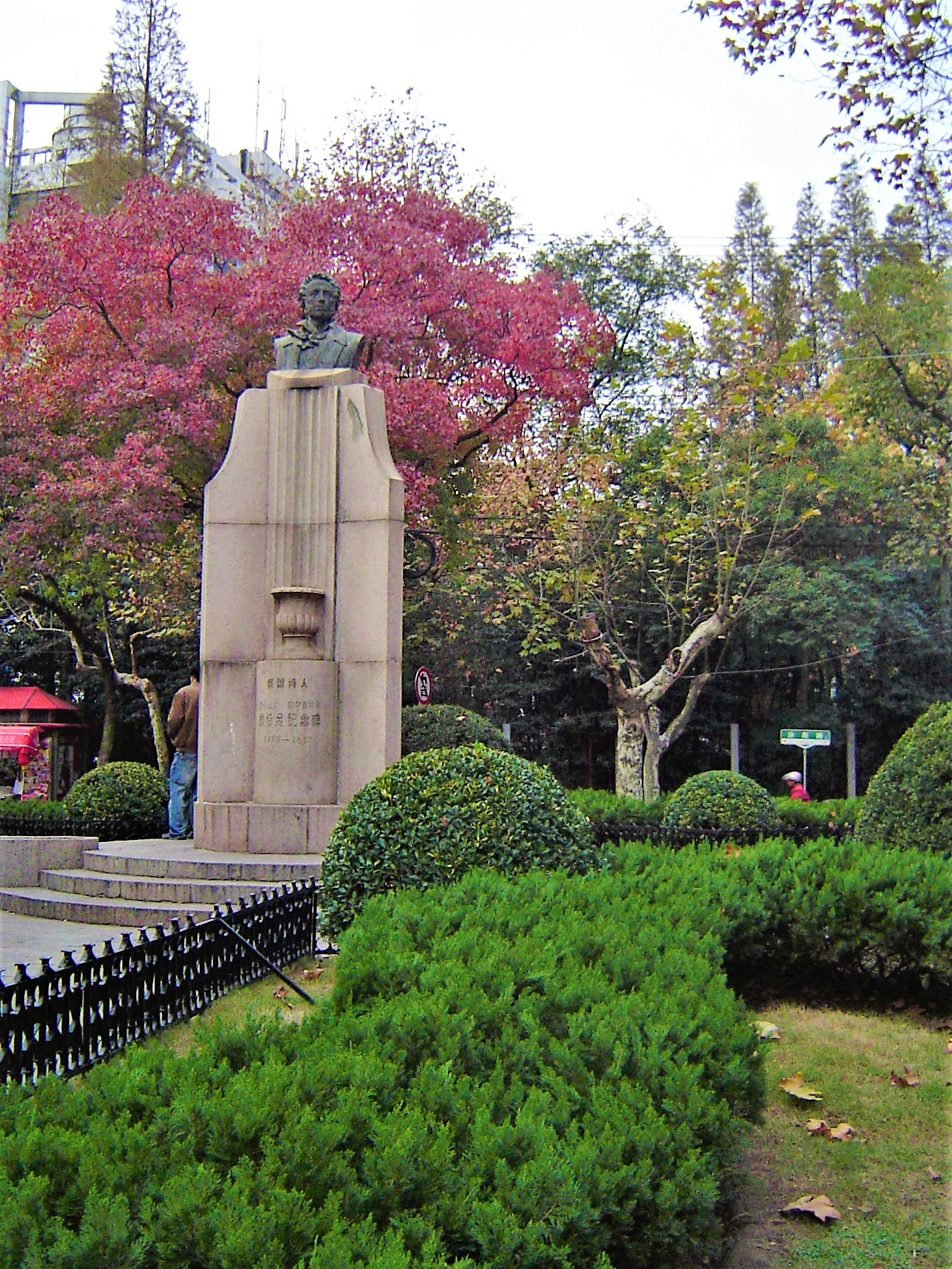
Pushkin monument in Shanghai

== During the Japanese occupation ==
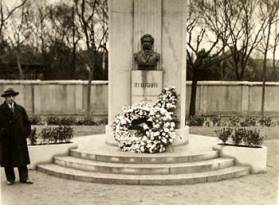
Pushkin bust in 1937

The Japanese formed a bureau for the Russian emigrees; it provided identification papers necessary to live, work and travel. The Shanghai Russians were left to choose between a Soviet citizenship or to remain stateless by support of the bureau. The stateless Russians were officially favoured by the regime, but in reality, they were not trusted and were exposed to a great risk of being arrested as spies for the Soviet Union. They were also often enlisted in the army for work along the border with the Soviet Union. After 1941, when Nazi Germany invaded the Soviet Union, they were in an even more sensitive situation. To separate the anti-Soviet Russians from the Soviet Russians, the former were ordered to wear a badge with the colours of the Czar — later a white numbered disk of aluminium.

== After the Second World War ==
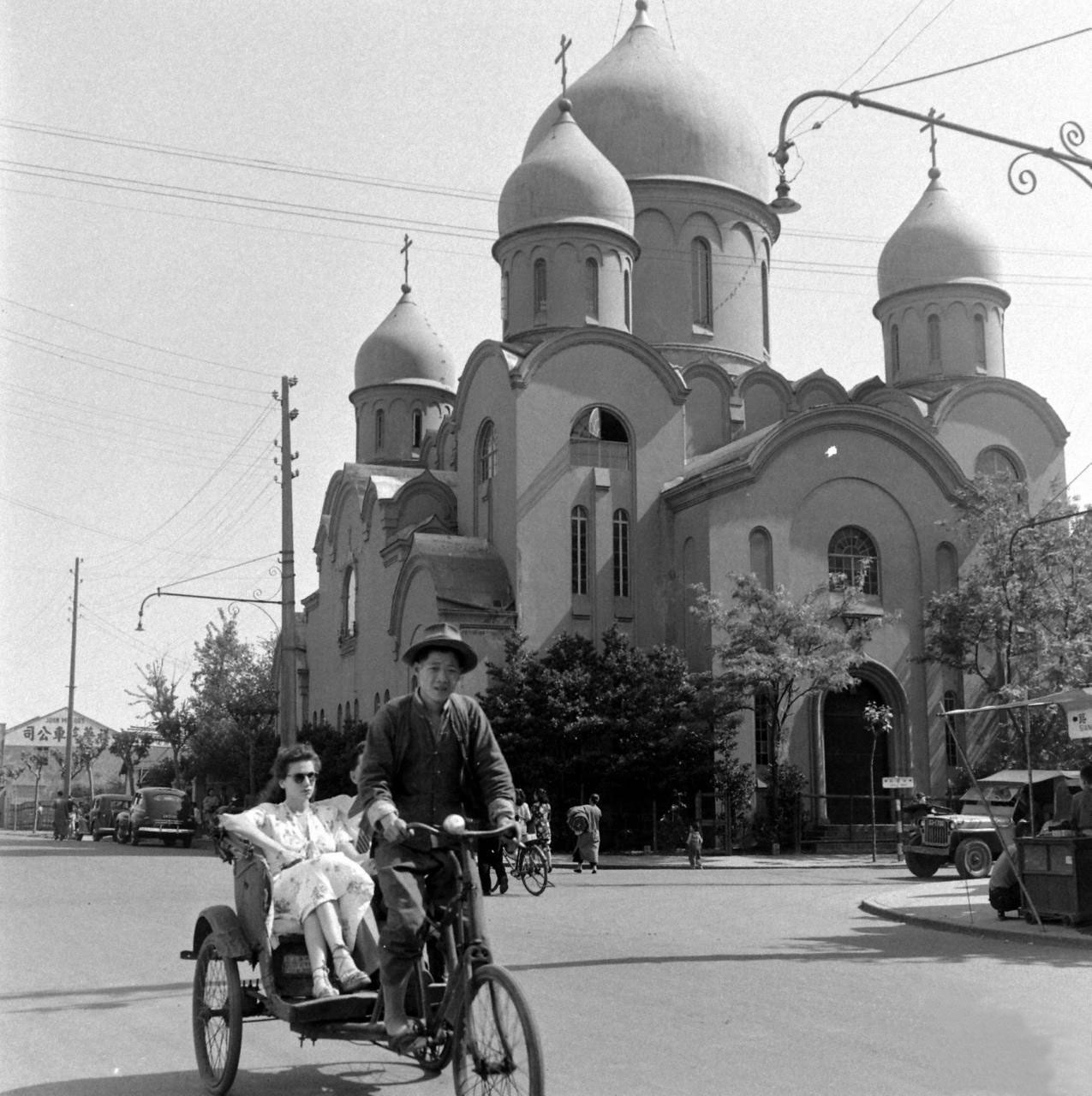
Russian Orthodox Church in Shanghai around 1948

The Shanghai Russians survived through the difficult days of the Japanese occupation, but left in the end with the advance of the Communists. They were forced to flee, first to a refugee camp on the island of Tubabao in the Philippines and then mainly to the United States and Australia; however, many settled in Hong Kong. The Russian monuments of Shanghai did not escape the ravages of the Cultural Revolution. The Pushkin statue, funded by public subscription and unveiled on the centenary of the poet's death, was smashed by the Red Guards in 1966. It was subsequently restored in 1987. The Orthodox Church of St. Nicholas, consecrated and elaborately frescoed in 1933, was converted into a washing machine factory, and subsequently a restaurant. The municipal government terminated the lease of the cathedral to the restaurant in 2004. The building became a bookshop in 2019.

In the 1967 British film A Countess from Hong Kong, written and directed by Charlie Chaplin, Sophia Loren plays the only child of Russian aristocrats who escaped, during the Russian Revolution, to Shanghai, where she subsequently was born. Her parents died there when she was thirteen; she was the mistress of a gangster at fourteen. Asked how she has come to live in Hong Kong, she replies, "Well, there was another war, another revolution — so here we are."
