= Top Chef: Just Desserts season 1 =

Top Chef: Just Desserts
- Season 1
- No. of contestants: 12
- Winner: Yigit Pura
- No. of episodes: 10

Release
- Original network: Bravo
- Original release: September 15 – November 17, 2010

Season chronology
- Next → Season 2

The first season of Top Chef: Just Desserts was broadcast on Bravo. It featured 12 pastry chefs fighting to win the title of Top Chef.

== Guest judges ==
- Jacques Torres (Ep. 1 Elimination)
- Elizabeth Falkner (Ep. 2 Quickfire and Elimination)
- Mark Peel (Ep. 2 Elimination)
- Sylvia Weinstock (Ep. 3 Quickfire and Elimination)(Ep. 9 Elimination)
- Gale Gand (Ep. 4 Quickfire and Elimination)
- Sherry Yard (Ep. 5 Quickfire and Elimination)
- Michael Laiskonis (Ep. 6 Quickfire and Elimination)
- Nancy Silverton (Ep. 7 Elimination)
- Shinmin Li (Ep. 8 Quickfire and Elimination)
- Dana Cowin (Ep. 8 Elimination)
- François Payard (Ep. 9 Quickfire and Elimination)

== Contestants ==
Names, ages, and hometowns below are from the Bravo website. In the order eliminated:

Name	Age	Current Residence	Hometown	Finish	Place
Tania Peterson	39	Boston, Massachusetts	Cambridge, Massachusetts	Episode 1	12
Tim Nugent	41	Oakland, California	Alburgh, Vermont	Episode 2	11
Seth Caro	34	New York, New York	Chappaqua, New York	Episode 4	10(WD)
Malika Ameen	35	Chicago, Illinois	Chicago, Illinois	Episode 4	9(WD)
Heather Chittum	37	Washington, D.C.	Brooklyn, New York	Episode 5	8
Erika Davis	40	Jacksonville Beach, Florida	Tamms, Illinois	Episode 6	7
Heather Hurlbert	40	Atlanta, Georgia	Seoul, South Korea	Episode 7	6
Eric Wolitzky	38	Manhattan	Rochester, New York	Episode 8	5
Zac Young	27	New York, New York	Portland, Maine	Episode 9	4
Morgan Wilson	37	Dallas, Texas	Sonora, California	Episode 10	3-2
Danielle Keene	29	South Pasadena, California	Los Angeles, California	Episode 10	3-2
Yigit Pura	29	San Francisco, California	Ankara, Turkey	Episode 10	1(Fan Favorite)

- Age at time filming

== Contestant progress ==
Contestant	1	2	3	4	5	6	7	8	9	Finale
Quickfire; Winner(s)	Seth	Danielle	Erika	Morgan	Yigit	Zac	Heather H.^{1} Yigit^{1} Zac^{1}	Morgan^{1}	Morgan^{1}	None^{1}
Yigit	IN	HIGH	LOW	IN	HIGH	WIN	LOW	LOW	IN	WINNER
Danielle	LOW	IN	LOW	IN	LOW	LOW	WIN	HIGH	WIN	RUNNER-UP
Morgan	LOW	IN	IN (+)	WIN	WIN	HIGH	WIN	HIGH	IN	RUNNER-UP
Zac	HIGH	IN	LOW	IN	HIGH	HIGH	LOW	WIN	OUT	
Eric	IN	HIGH	WIN	HIGH	LOW	HIGH	WIN	OUT		
Heather H.	WIN	IN	IN (+)	HIGH	IN	LOW	OUT			
Erika	IN	WIN	HIGH	IN	IN	OUT				
Heather C.	IN	IN	OUT^{2}	IN	OUT					
Malika	IN	LOW	HIGH	WD^{4}						
Seth	HIGH	LOW	LOW	WD^{3}						
Tim	IN	OUT								
Tania	OUT									

^Note 1: The chefs did not receive immunity.
^Note 2: Heather C. was reinstated in Episode 4, after being eliminated in the previous episode.
^Note 3: Seth was removed from the competition when he was judged medically unable to continue.
^Note 4: Malika withdrew from the competition during the Judges' Table evaluation

(WINNER) The chef won the season and was awarded the title Top Chef.
(RUNNER-UP) The chef was a runner-up for the season.
(WIN) The chef won that episode's Elimination Challenge.
(HIGH) The chef was selected as one of the top entries in the Elimination Challenge, but did not win.
(LOW) The chef was selected as one of the bottom entries in the Elimination Challenge, but was not eliminated.
(OUT) The chef lost that week's Elimination Challenge and was out of the competition.
(WD) The chef left or was asked to leave the competition.
(IN) The chef neither won nor lost that week's Elimination Challenge. They also were not up to be eliminated.
[IN (+)] The chef won a pair or team challenge but was not chosen as one of the judges' favorites.
[IN (-)] The chef lost a pair or team challenge but was not selected as one of the judges' least favorites.

== Episodes ==
Each episode includes two challenges. The Quickfire Challenge is a short, simple challenge with a varying reward each week; in the initial episodes of the season, it usually guarantees the winner immunity from being sent home that week; however, in the latter stages, the Quickfire winner is given an advantage in the upcoming Elimination Challenge. It also has been made clear that Quickfire winners this season may receive other rewards, including cash prizes. The Elimination Challenge is a more complex challenge that determines who goes home. One or more judges join the show each week to evaluate both the Quickfire and Elimination challenges. Each week's elimination is announced in a segment called "Judges' Table."

=== Episode 1: Mr. Chocolate ===
- Quickfire Challenge: The 12 pastry chefs are challenged to create their signature dessert. However, a few minutes into the challenge, Gail Simmons and Johnny Iuzzini announce that the chefs must turn their signature dish into a cupcake. The winner will receive immunity.
  - Top: Heather C., Seth, Tania
  - Bottom: Malika, Tim, Zac
    - WINNER: Seth (Steamed Malaysian Coconut Cake with Basil Buttercream and Candied Pine Nuts)
- Elimination Challenge: The chefs must create a dessert using America's favorite ingredient: chocolate. They must cook for 50 chocolate lovers, including guest judge Jacques Torres.
  - WINNER: Heather H. (Dark Chocolate Mousse Torte with Chocolate Grand Marnier Sauce)
  - ELIMINATED: Tania (Flourless Chocolate Torte with Earl Grey and White Chocolate Mousse)
- Guest Judge: Jacques Torres
- Original Airdate: September 15, 2010

=== Episode 2: Cocktail with a Twist ===
- Quickfire Challenge: The 11 remaining pastry chefs must create a dish that celebrates penny candy. The winner will receive immunity.
  - Top: Danielle, Heather H., Zac
  - Bottom: Eric, Heather C., Seth
    - WINNER: Danielle ("Worms in Dirt" – Chocolate Mousse with Lemon Gummies, Malt Balls and Lemon Soda)
- Elimination Challenge: The chefs must create a dessert inspired by a cocktail.
  - WINNER: Erika (Margarita Bombe with a Lime Cookie, Tequila Mousse and Grand Marnier Créme Brûlée)
  - ELIMINATED: Tim (Basil Pudding with Orange, Kumquat and Lime Granita)
- Guest Judge: Elizabeth Falkner, Mark Peel
- Original Airdate: September 22, 2010

=== Episode 3: Glee Club ===
- Quickfire Challenge: The chefs must create a wedding cake in 90 minutes for legendary wedding cake creator Sylvia Weinstock. Given the time constraints, the contestants are provided with pre-baked sheet cake to construct the cake. However, the contestants are in charge of icing, fillings, decoration, and the final overall taste and appearance of the cake. The winner will receive immunity.
  - Top: Erika, Heather H., Morgan
  - Bottom: Eric, Malika, Seth
    - WINNER: Erika ('Mocha Explosion' Cake with Kahlua Buttercream)
- Elimination Challenge: The chefs are divided into two teams, and must throw a bake sale supporting the Glee Club and Pep Squad of St. Monica's High School, both of which were looking to fundraise for upcoming club trips. The team which raises the most money for their club wins, while one member of the losing team will be up for elimination.
  - Team Pep: Eric, Erika, Heather H., Malika, Morgan
    - Peanut Butter Krispy Bar (Eric)
    - Chunky Chocolate Chip Walnut Cookie (Erika)
    - Butter Cookie with Chocolate and Dulce de Leche Cream (Heather H.)
    - Toffee Fudge Brownie (Malika)
    - Vanilla Bean and Milk Chocolate Cupcake (Morgan)
  - Team Glee: Danielle, Heather C., Seth, Yigit, Zac
    - Coconut Cupcake with Salted Caramel Buttercream (Danielle)
    - Peanut Butter Cookie (Heather C.)
    - Mocha Financier with Orange Creamsicle Sauce (Seth)
    - Chocolate Caramel Pudding with Ginger, Hazelnut Crumble, and Marshmallows (Yigit)
    - Strawberry Shortcake with Rainbow Sugar (Zac)
  - After the bake sale, it was determined that Team Pep outraised Team Glee by $10, thus giving Team Pep the win. The judges also agreed that there were various taste and execution problems in all of Team Glee's bake sale items. Although Team Pep won, producers of the show opted to donate to both clubs to finance their trips, as well as making a $5000 donation to the high school.
  - At Judges' Table, Gail narrowed down the chefs of Team Pep in contention for the win to Eric, Erika, and Malika.
    - WINNER: Eric
    - ELIMINATED: Heather C.
- Elimination Challenge Prize: $5000 divided among the winning team members
- Guest Judge: Sylvia Weinstock
- Original Airdate: September 29, 2010

=== Episode 4: Lucent Dossier ===
- Quickfire Challenge: The chefs must each create an eclectic ice cream sundae, using ice cream provided from Breyers. Each chef will work with a different flavor of ice cream determined by knife draw.
  - Top: Morgan, Yigit, Zac
  - Bottom: Danielle, Eric, Erika
    - WINNER: Morgan ("Sunday Snack" Oreo Mint Chocolate Chip Ice Cream Sandwich with Chocolate Milk)

Following the announcement of the Quickfire challenge, Seth was removed from the competition when the producers determined he did not have medical clearance to continue. Heather C., who was eliminated in Episode 3, was brought back to the competition.

- Elimination Challenge: The chefs work in teams of three to create a full dessert showcase for the Lucent Dossier Experience, consisting of: one architectural showpiece, one flaming dessert, and one individual dessert from each chef in the team. The showpiece will be judged according to its overall presentation, construction, and how well it translates the inspiration from the Lucent Dossier experience, while the flaming dessert and the individual desserts will be judged as the dessert components of the challenge. Since Morgan, Yigit, and Zac were the favorites during the Quickfire, they were selected as the captains of the three teams and were given the opportunity to select their team's members.
  - Team Exotic: Morgan, Eric, Heather H.
    - Flaming Dessert: Almond Cream with Spiced Cherry Flambé
    - Mango Panna Cotta, Açaí Fluid Gel, and Passion Fruit Sorbet (Morgan)
    - Lemon Caramel Roulade with Pomegranate Sauce and Candied Kumquats (Eric)
    - Triple Chocolate Chai Tea Mousse Torte (Heather H.)
  - Team Sassy, Sexy, Sultry: Yigit, Danielle, Erika
    - Flaming Dessert: Almond Mirliton Flambéed with Bourbon Peaches
    - Crème Fraîche and Sweet Lime Bavarian with Vanilla Bean Sorbet (Yigit)
    - Chocolate Mousse Cake with Basil Ice Cream (Danielle)
    - Almond Ice Cream Bar with Roasted Pineapple (Erika)
  - Team Naughty & Nice: Zac, Heather C., Malika
    - Flaming Dessert: Chocolate Cake with Flambéed Cherries
    - Banana Crème Fraîche Cake with Red Curry Frosting (Zac)
    - Black Pepper Pineapple with Chocolate Sherbert and Meringue Shards (Heather C.)
    - Saffron Panna Cotta with Feuilletine Crunch and Candied Ginger (Malika)
  - WINNING TEAM: Team Exotic
  - WINNER: Morgan
  - ELIMINATED: None. Although her dessert was highly praised, Malika chose to withdraw from the competition at Judges' Table, stating that she did not enjoy cooking in a competitive environment.
- Guest Judge: Gale Gand
- Original Airdate: October 6, 2010

=== Episode 5: Edible Fashion ===
- Quickfire Challenge: The chefs are challenged to create a dessert soufflé. The winner will receive immunity.
  - Top: Danielle, Morgan, Yigit
  - Bottom: Erika, Heather H., Zac
    - WINNER: Yigit (Chocolate Soufflé with Passion Fruit and Vanilla Bean Ice Cream)
- Elimination Challenge: The chefs are tasked with creating dresses that will act as exhibition pieces for a special party being thrown to celebrate LA Fashion Week. Each chef must create their own dress, and they will select a pair of shoes that will inspire their design. The chefs have free rein to use any edible materials for the construction of their dresses. Along with their dresses which will be judged according to its construction and final appearance, the chefs must also make two petit fours to accompany their edible dresses as 'accessories' which will be judged as the dessert component of this challenge.
  - WINNER: Morgan (Spiced Raspberry "Ruby Ring" Bonbons; Red Hot Cinnamon Macaroon "Earrings")
  - ELIMINATED: Heather C. (Chocolate Caramel "Clutches"; Maldon Sea Salt Chambord Fleur De Lys "Hair Pins")
  - Elimination Challenge Prize: $20,000
- Guest Judge: Sherry Yard
- Original Airdate: October 13, 2010

=== Episode 6: Black and White ===
- Quickfire Challenge: The chefs must use savory ingredients in their desserts which had to be cooked in only one pot. The winner will receive immunity.
  - Top: Morgan, Yigit, Zac
  - Bottom: Danielle, Eric, Heather H.
    - WINNER: Zac (Steamed Beet Cake with Sweet Goat Cheese Cream and Lemon Thyme Gremolata)

Although Zac won immunity following his Quickfire win, he opted to relinquish his immunity in exchange for $5000.

- Elimination Challenge: The chefs must create desserts in a black and white color scheme for the 128th anniversary party of the Los Angeles Times.
  - WINNER: Yigit (Chocolate Cake with White Chocolate Mousse, Berry Compote, and Almond Milk Ice Cream)
  - ELIMINATED: Erika (Lemon Poppy Seed Ice Cream with White Chocolate Pavè and Blackberry Crème Brûlée)
- Guest Judge: Michael Laiskonis
- Original Airdate: October 20, 2010

=== Episode 7: Dessert Wars ===
- Quickfire Challenge: The chefs are broken into teams to compete in a mise en place relay race. The race consists of four rounds: form 12 perfect tart shells, pipe eight butter cream roses, separate and whisk six egg whites to peaks firm enough that the bowl could be held overhead for 10 seconds without the whites falling out, and stretch strudel dough the length of the table and then roll the strudel. Each member of the winning team receives $3,000.
  - Red Team: Heather H., Yigit, Zac
  - Black Team: Danielle, Eric, Morgan.
    - WINNERS: Danielle, Eric, Morgan
- Elimination Challenge: In the same teams as in the Quickfire Challenge, the chefs create their ultimate "Dessert Shop". Each team member is responsible for three desserts. One item must be a bread item. They are given $1000 to shop at Albertsons. The red team creates Pastry Playland, while the black team creates Whisk Me Away. Danielle and Eric take the front of the house for Whisk Me Away; Yigit and Zac run front of the house for Pastry Playground.

Pastry Playland: Zac, Heather, Yigit

- Zac's Desserts: Donut filled with Wild Berry Jam served with a Lemon Verbena Milkshake; Fennel Seed and Kalamata Brioche; and Carmel Corn with Bacon Bits
- Yigit's Desserts: Chocolate Tart with Carmel and Peanuts; Margarita Sorbet; Classic Fraisier with Raspberry, Strawberry, and Hibiscus Gelee
- Heather's Desserts: Lemon Cream Pie; Frozen Key Lime Bar with Strawberry Sauce; Milk Chocolate Pudding Cup with Fresh Mango

Whisk Me Away: Eric, Danielle, Morgan

- Eric's Desserts: Classic Chocolate Chip Cookie; Vanilla Malted Cake with Chocolate Mousse; Banana Loaf with Brown Butter and Tangerine Icing
- Danielle's Desserts: Pistachio Shortcake with Lemon Cream and Strawberries; Coffee Cream Pie with Hazelnut Brittle; Gingerale Float with Raspberry and Tangerine-Lime Sorbet
- Morgan's Desserts: Pretzel Stick with Two Mustards; Chocolate Mousse Cake with a Crème Brûlée Center; Fried Lemon Pie and Salted Caramel Ice Cream

- WINNING TEAM: Whisk Me Away
- ELIMINATED: Heather H. of Pastry Playland
- Elimination Challenge Prize: $30,000 divided among the winning team members

- Guest Judge: Nancy Silverton
- Original Airdate: October 27, 2010

=== Episode 8: Celebritea Party ===
- Quickfire Challenge: The chefs must create an edible bouquet.
  - Top: Morgan, Yigit
  - Bottom: Danielle, Eric, Zac
    - WINNER: Morgan (Chocolate Flowers with Pulled Sugar Bow)
    - Quickfire Challenge Prize: $5,000
- Elimination Challenge: The chefs must create a tea party dessert inspired by a celebrity couple. However, all of the chocolate in the Top Chef pantry was removed.
  - WINNER: Zac (Julie Andrews and Blake Edwards: Mascarpone Cheesecake with Cap'n Crunch and Tarragon Sugar, Pink Pavlova with Grapefruit Curd and Meringue)
  - ELIMINATED: Eric (Stedman and Oprah: Rosemary Shortbread with Apricot Compote, Pecan Shortbread with Caramel)
- Guest Judge: Shinmin Li
- Original Airdate: November 3, 2010

=== Episode 9: Ben and Sylvia's 61st ===
- Quickfire Challenge: The chefs must create a box of four truffles using Godiva chocolate that tell their life story.
  - Top: Danielle, Morgan
  - Bottom: Yigit, Zac
    - WINNER: Morgan (Passion Fruit and Milk Chocolate Bonbon, Açaí Rose Water Jelly on Top of a Bittersweet Ganache, Mendiant with Rocher Filling, Green Tea and White Chocolate Butter Ganache)
- Elimination Challenge: The chefs must create a 61st anniversary cake for Sylvia Weinstock and her husband, Ben.
  - WINNER: Danielle (Chocolate Cake with Sour Cherry Compote and Greek Yogurt Ice Cream)
  - ELIMINATED: Zac (Top Tier: Dark Chocolate and Fresh Raspberry; Bottom Tier: Lemon Sponge and Raspberry Jam)
  - Elimination Challenge Prize: $15,000
- Guest Judge: François Payard
- Original Airdate: November 10, 2010

=== Episode 10: Finale ===
- Final Challenge: Create a four course dessert tasting menu
  - Danielle:
    - First Course: Hazelnut Cake with Spanish Goat Cheese and Fig Jam
    - Second Course: Lemon Parfait, Pomelo and Tangerine Sorbet and Moscato Granita
    - Third Course: Baked Alaska, Strawberry Sundae and Root Beer Float
    - Fourth Course: Chocolate Pudding Cake with Pistachio Ice Cream
  - Morgan:
    - First Course: Passion Fruit Cannoli with Mango Carpaccio, Fluid Gel and Tarragon Jelly
    - Second Course: Blueberry Pavlova with Lemon Cream in Citrus Chamomile Broth and Pearls
    - Third Course: Manjari Soufflé Cake with Raspberry Sorbet and Cocoa Nib Paper
    - Fourth Course: White Pepper Crème Brûlée, Black Pepper Baumkuchen and Blackberry Anise Macaron
  - Yigit:
    - First Course: Cucumber Lime Sorbet with Straus Yogurt Caviar Pearls
    - Second Course: Strawberry Sorbet and Lemongrass Ginger Ice Cream with Berry Meringue and Consommé
    - Third Course: Muscovado Braised Pineapple and Coconut Cake, Coconut Lime Soup with Tapioca Pearls
    - Fourth Course: Hazelnut Dacquoise, Milk Jam and Salted Caramel Ice Cream
  - WINNER: Yigit
  - RUNNERS-UP: Morgan and Danielle
- Guest Judge:
- Original Airdate: November 17, 2010
