= List of Netflix Spain Original programming =

Netflix Spain is the Spanish subsidiary of the American streaming service Netflix. Since its launch in October 2015, it has distributed a number of Spanish "originals"—primarily television series, along with miniseries.

This article lists the Spanish original television series produced or distributed by Netflix.

== TV shows ==
=== Scripted ===
Title	Genre	Premiere	Ending	Seasons	Status
Las Chicas del Cable	Period drama	28 April 2017	3 July 2020	5 seasons, 42 episodes	Ended
Élite	Teen drama	5 October 2018	26 July 2024	8 seasons, 64 episodes	Ended
Alta Mar	Period drama	24 May 2019	7 August 2020	3 seasons, 22 episodes	Ended
Criminal: España	Thriller	20 September 2019		1 season, 3 episodes	Miniseries
Hache	Thriller	1 November 2019	5 February 2021	2 seasons, 14 episodes	Ended
Días de Navidad	Drama	6 December 2019		1 season, 3 episodes	Miniseries
El Vecino	Comedy	31 December 2019	2 May 2021	2 seasons, 18 episodes	Ended
Valeria	Romantic dramedy	8 May 2020	14 February 2025	4 seasons, 30 episodes	Ended
White Lines	Drama	15 May 2020		1 season, 10 episodes	Ended
Memorias de Idhún	Anime	10 September 2020	8 January 2021	2 seasons, 10 episodes	Ended
Alguien tiene que morir	Period thriller	16 October 2020		1 season, 3 episodes	Miniseries
Los favoritos de Midas	Thriller drama	13 November 2020		1 season, 6 episodes	Miniseries
El desorden que dejas	Thriller drama	11 December 2020		1 season, 8 episodes	Miniseries
Sky Rojo	Black comedy action drama	19 March 2021	13 January 2023	3 seasons, 24 episodes	Ended
El inocente	Mystery thriller	30 April 2021		1 seasons, 6 episodes	Miniseries
Élite: Historias breves	Teen drama	14 June 2021	23 December 2021	2 seasons, 21 episodes	Ended
Jaguar	Period thriller	22 September 2021		1 season, 6 episodes	Ended
El tiempo que te doy	Romantic drama	29 October 2021		1 season, 10 episodes	Ended
Feria: La luz más oscura	Fantasy thriller	28 January 2022		1 season, 8 episodes	Ended
Érase una vez... pero ya no	Musical comedy	11 March 2022		1 season, 6 episodes	Ended
Los herederos de la tierra	Period drama	15 April 2022		1 season, 8 episodes	Ended
Bienvenidos a Edén	Teen drama	6 May 2022	21 April 2023	2 seasons, 16 episodes	Ended
Intimidad	Drama	10 June 2022		1 season, 8 episodes	Miniseries
La noche más larga	Prison thriller	8 July 2022		1 season, 6 episodes	Ended
Fanático	Teen drama	29 July 2022		1 season, 5 episodes	Ended
Alma	Supernatural thriller	19 August 2022		1 season, 9 episodes	Ended
Tú no eres especial	Fantasy comedy	2 September 2022		1 season, 6 episodes	Ended
Santo	Crime action thriller	16 September 2022		1 season, 6 episodes	Ended
Las de la última filma	Comedy-drama	23 September 2022		1 season, 6 episodes	Ended
Sagrada familia	Thriller drama	14 October 2022	17 November 2023	2 seasons, 16 episodes	Ended
Si lo hubiera sabido	Fantasy drama	28 October 2022		1 season, 8 episodes	Ended
Smiley	Romantic comedy	7 December 2022		1 season, 8 episodes	Ended
Machos alfa	Comedy	31 December 2022	present	5 seasons, 42 episodes	Renewed for a final season
La chica de nieve	Comedy	27 January 2023	present	2 seasons, 12 episodes	Pending
Todas las veces que nos enamoramos	Romantic comedy	14 February 2023		1 season, 8 episodes	Ended
Hasta el cielo: La serie	Crime action thriller	17 March 2023		1 season, 7 episodes	Ended
El silencio	Psychological thriller	19 May 2023		1 season, 6 episodes	Ended
Un cuento perfecto	Romantic comedy	28 July 2023		1 season, 5 episodes	Miniseries
El cuerpo en llamas	True crime thriller	8 September 2023		1 season, 8 episodes	Miniseries
Berlín	Heist crime drama	29 December 2023	15 May 2026	2 seasons, 16 episodes	Ended
Mano de hierro	Crime thriller	15 March 2024		1 season, 8 episodes	Ended
El caso Asunta	True crime drama	26 April 2024		1 season, 6 episodes	Miniseries
Ni una más	Teen drama	31 May 2024		1 season, 8 episodes	Miniseries
Clanes	Thriller	21 June 2024	present	2 seasons, 14 episodes	Pending
Respira	Hospital drama	30 August 2024	present	2 seasons, 16 episodes	Renewed for a final season
La última noche en Tremor	Psychological thriller	25 October 2024		1 seasons, 8 episodes	Miniseries
Asalto al Banco Central	Crime thriller	8 November 2024		1 seasons, 5 episodes	Miniseries
1992	Thriller	13 December 2024		1 seasons, 6 episodes	Ended
Manual para señoritas	Period comedy-drama	28 March 2025		1 seasons, 8 episodes	Ended
El jardinero	Romantic thriller	11 April 2025		1 seasons, 6 episodes	Miniseries
Legado	Family drama	16 May 2025		1 seasons, 8 episodes	Ended
Olympo	Teen drama	20 June 2025		1 seasons, 8 episodes	Ended
Superestar	Biopic	18 July 2025		1 seasons, 6 episodes	Miniseries
Dos tumbas	Crime thriller	29 August 2025		1 seasons, 3 episodes	Miniseries
El refugio atómico	Sci-Fi thriller	19 September 2025		1 seasons, 8 episodes	Ended
Animal	Comedy	3 October 2025	present	1 seasons, 9 episodes	Renewed for season 2 and 3
El cuco de cristal	Crime thriller	14 November 2025		1 seasons, 6 episodes	Miniseries
Ciudad de sombras	Crime thriller	12 December 2025		1 seasons, 6 episodes	Miniseries
Innato	Psychological thriller	23 December 2025		1 seasons, 8 episodes	Ended
Salvador	Action drama	6 February 2026		1 seasons, 8 episodes	Ended
Esa noche	Thriller	13 March 2026		1 seasons, 6 episodes	Miniseries
Awaiting release
Oasis	Crime thriller	19 June 2026		1 season, ¿? episodes	Awaiting release
El mapa de los anhelos	Romantic drama	17 July 2026		1 season, ¿? episodes	Awaiting release
Toda la verdad de mis mentiras	Romantic dramedy	28 August 2026		1 season, 5 episodes	Awaiting release
El problema final	Period thriller	TBA		1 season, 5 episodes	Awaiting release
Los secretos de la cortesana	Period drama	TBA		1 season, ¿? episodes	Awaiting release
Aquel	Biopic	TBA		1 season, ¿? episodes	Awaiting release
El crimen de Pazos	True crime drama	TBA		1 season, ¿? episodes	Awaiting release
Lobo	True crime period drama	TBA		1 season, ¿? episodes	Awaiting release
En el nombre de Marta	True crime drama	TBA		1 season, 6 episodes	Awaiting release
La acusación	Thriller	TBA		1 season, 8 episodes	Awaiting release
Buscametales	Heist crime drama	TBA		1 season, ¿? episodes	Awaiting release

==== Continuations ====
Title	Genre	Previous network(s)	Premiere	Ending	Seasons	Status
Paquita Salas (seasons 2-3)	Mockumentary	Flooxer	29 June 2018	28 June 2019	2 seasons, 11 episodes	Ended
La casa de papel (seasons 3-5)	Heist crime drama	Antena 3	19 July 2019	3 December 2021	3 seasons, 26 episodes	Ended
Muertos S.L. (seasons 3-4)	Black comedy	Movistar Plus+	21 August 2025	7 August 2026	1 season, 6 episodes	Renewed for a final season

==== Coproductions ====
Title	Genre	Partner	Premiere	Seasons	Status
El ministerio del tiempo (season 3)	Fantasy drama	RTVE	28 January 2018	1 season, 13 episodes	Ended
Brigada Costa del Sol (season 1)	Period drama thriller	Telecinco	25 October 2019	1 season, 13 episodes	Ended
Vivir sin permiso (season 2)	Family thriller	Telecinco	31 January 2020	1 season, 10 episodes	Ended
Toy Boy (season 2)	Erotic thriller	Atresmedia	11 February 2022	1 season, 8 episodes	Ended
Entrevías (seasons 1-4)	Family thriller	Telecinco	20 May 2022	4 seasons, 32 episodes	Ended
Los pacientes del doctor García (season 1)	Period drama	RTVE	28 April 2023	1 season, 10 episodes	Ended
Express (season 2)	Thriller	Starzplay	7 June 2024	1 season, 8 episodes	Ended
Valle salvaje (seasons 1-3)	Period drama soap opera	RTVE	19 September 2024	3 seasons, 400 episodes	On going
Awaiting release
Sira (season 1)	Period drama	Atresmedia	TBA	1 seasons, ¿? episodes	Awaiting release

=== Unscripted ===
==== Docuseries ====
Title	Subject	Premiere	Ending	Seasons
Examen de conciencia	True crime	25 January 2019		1 season, 3 episodes

==== Reality ====
Title	Subject	Premiere	Ending	Seasons
Niquelao!	Baking competition	25 October 2019		1 season, 6 episodes
