= List of Nailed It! episodes =

Nailed It! is an American reality television series that premiered on March 9, 2018 on Netflix. The series is a bake-off competition in the style of reality television, where three amateur bakers compete to replicate complicated cakes and confectionery in order to win a $10,000 cash prize and a "nailed it" trophy.

As of August 4, 2023, 66 episodes of Nailed It! have been released, including three specials, concluding the seventh season.

== Series overview ==
Season	Episodes	Originally released
1	6	March 9, 2018
2	7	June 29, 2018
Holiday 1	7	December 7, 2018
3	6	May 17, 2019
Holiday 2	6	November 22, 2019
4	8	April 1, 2020
5: Double Trouble	6	March 26, 2021
6	6	September 15, 2021
7: Halloween	4	October 5, 2022
The Big Baking Challenge	10	August 4, 2023

== Episodes ==
=== Season 1 (2018) ===
No. overall	No. in season	Title	Contestants	Guest judge	Original release date
1	1	"First Date to Life Mate"	**Elena (winner of Nail it or Fail it)**, Heather (winner of Bakers Choice) and Michael	Sylvia Weinstock	March 9, 2018
2	2	"Fantasyland"	**Toni**, Kevin and Amanda	Zac Young	March 9, 2018
3	3	"Head Under Water"	**Danielle**, Maaz and Sal	Valerie Gordon	March 9, 2018
4	4	"Weird Science"	**Mike**, Alexis and Megan	Dave Arnold	March 9, 2018
5	5	"Big in Japan"	**Rachel**, Michelle and Dana	Yolanda Gampp	March 9, 2018
6	6	"In Your Face!"	**Anabell**, Kyle and Kymberli	Jay Chandrasekhar	March 9, 2018

=== Season 2 (2018) ===
No. overall	No. in season	Title	Contestants	Guest judge	Original release date
7	1	"High Society"	**Bethany House**, Evan Peter and Jennifer Sterben	Jon Gabrus	June 29, 2018
8	2	"Fictitious and Delicious"	**Chris Elam**, Kristina Black and Nicole Combs	Ron Ben-Israel	June 29, 2018
9	3	"Tailgate, Failgate"	**Mark Mendez**, William Edwards and Leean Muns	Johnny Hekker	June 29, 2018
10	4	"Holi-Daze"	**Knephaunatoria Smith**, Joelito Nunez and Erin Crocker	Waylynn Lucas	June 29, 2018
11	5	"Zoo you Bake?"	**Kate Christenbury**, Kelly Williams Bolar and John Carroll	Art Smith	June 29, 2018
12	6	"Out Of This World"	**Ashley Jennings**, Rosie Hatch and Felicia Ramos-Peters	Joshua John Russell	June 29, 2018
13	7	"Bonus: 3,2,1...Ya Not Done!"	**Bobby Berk**, Tan France, Karamo Brown & Jonathan Van Ness	Antoni Porowski	June 29, 2018

=== Holiday Season 1 (2018) ===
No. overall	No. in season	Title	Contestants	Guest judge	Original release date
14	1	"Jingle Fails"	**Gavin Schmidt**, Kelvin Truitt and Angie McMahon	Lauren Lapkus	December 7, 2018
15	2	"Winter Blunderland"	**Tanya Eby**, Brian Cookstra and Lily Orn	Justin Willman	December 7, 2018
16	3	"You Mitzvah Spot!"	**Martina Anto-Ocrah**, Amit Yohanan and James Decoite	Sylvia Weinstock	December 7, 2018
17	4	"It's a Family A-fail"	**Angie & Antoinette Williams**, Elleni & Terry Skarpos and Matthew & Joanne Medeiros	Gemma Stafford	December 7, 2018
18	5	"Toying Around"	**Jill Briganti**, Alicia Figliuolo and Joe Cogshell	Ron Funches	December 7, 2018
19	6	"3...2...1, Ya Done!"	**Knephaunatoria Smith (Holi-daze)**, Amanda Giles (Fantasyland) and Sal Venturelli (Head Under Water)	Jason Mantzoukas	December 7, 2018
20	7	"Just Do It Yourself!"	**Dave Tozzolino**, Maggy Botros and Jesus Bautista	Jim Noonan and Kate Berlant	December 7, 2018

=== Season 3 (2019) ===
No. overall	No. in season	Title	Contestants	Guest judge	Original release date
21	1	"The Marvel Episode!"	**Benjamin Mumford-Zisk**, Cia Hang, Jordan Smith	Felicia Day	May 17, 2019
22	2	"Cake-O-Phobia"	**Emily Cook**, Beverly Blanchette, Casalear Gross	Natalie Sideserf	May 17, 2019
23	3	"Masterpiece or Disasterpiece?"	**Cassie Stephens**, Toyshika Peterson, Anil Pacheco	Betsy Sodaro	May 17, 2019
24	4	"Prehistoric Bakes"	**Yolie Seal**, Aaron Anderson, Ismath Khan	Rosanna Pansino	May 17, 2019
25	5	"Oui Can't Bake!"	**Beth Bailey**, Jennifer Parks, Jamie Olivier	Hubert Keller	May 17, 2019
26	6	"Ready to Wear, Ready to Eat"	**Allison Rook**, Everard Strong, Christian Rodriguez	Charles Phoenix	May 17, 2019

=== Holiday Season 2 (2019) ===
No. overall	No. in season	Title	Contestants	Guest judge	Original release date
27	1	"We're Scrooged!"	**Richard Sanchez**, Flora Aleman, Justin Madriaga	Jason Mantzoukas	November 22, 2019
28	2	"A Classic Christmess"	**Candice Coleman**, Samantha Cruz, Bob Postage	Maya Rudolph	November 22, 2019
29	3	"Shalo-many Fails!"	**Paul Scheer**, Bella Pori, Tito Covert-Ortiz (Although Paul won, he gave the money to the other two)	Ron Ben-Israel	November 22, 2019
30	4	"It's a Wonderfail Life"	**De'Jonnae Boyd**, Eric Girardi, Lynnette Behar	Bridget Everett	November 22, 2019
31	5	"One Fail, Two Fail. I Fail, You Fail!"	**Lisa Chambers**, Sunny Huang, Jason Rodriguez	Jillian Bell	November 22, 2019
32	6	"New Year, New Fails"	**Lora Ramey**, Brianna Kimbrell, Willie Blackmon	David Burtka	November 22, 2019

=== Season 4 (2020) ===
No. overall	No. in season	Title	Contestants	Guest judge	Original release date
33	1	"Let's Get Lit"	**Andrew 'Fish' Fischer**, Gail DePadre, Gregory Gardner	Matt Walsh	April 1, 2020
34	2	"The One with the 90's Theme"	**Whitney Martin**, David Simmons Jr., Crystal Roman	Fortune Feimster	April 1, 2020
35	3	"Indiana Fails and the Temple of Slop"	**Cheri Kelly**, Caroline Stapleton, J.J. Woodward	Gemma Stafford	April 1, 2020
36	4	"Chariots of Failure"	**Stephanie Blanet**, Shane Garrahan, Stacey Blanet	Gabby Douglas	April 1, 2020
37	5	"Jungle Bungle"	**Glennia Elijah**, Larry Nelson, Shelisha Schmidt	Rachel Fong	April 1, 2020
38	6	"Howdy, Failure!"	**Inocente 'Chimi' Freeman**, Mason Posch, Jim Maxwell	Adam Scott	April 1, 2020
39	7	"The Big Bake Theory"	**Sandra Hardeman and Seth**, Ebony Gammon and London, Raymond Dinglasan and Penelope	Valerie Gordon	April 1, 2020
40	8	"I Do ... Hope I Don't Fail"	**Jay Hanshaw**, Rachel Feldman, Ronald Jackson	Christina Tosi	April 1, 2020

=== Season 5: Double Trouble (2021) ===
No. overall	No. in season	Title	Contestants	Guest judge	Original release date
41	1	"An Ungodly Mess"	**Richard and Sarah**, Veronica and Justin, Ivonne and Kayla	Andrea Savage	March 26, 2021
42	2	"The Burbank State Fair"	**Selma Nilla and Lagoona Bloo**, Sonja and Shereta, Sheldon and Ron	Ron Funches	March 26, 2021
43	3	"We're Gonna Need a Bigger Cake"	**Harry and Heather**, Lizzy and Cameron, Jenna and Brooke	Lil Rel Howery	March 26, 2021
44	4	"Travel Dos and Donuts"	**Joey and Hunter**, Phil and Kenzie, Diana and Jackie	Bobby Lee	March 26, 2021
45	5	"I've Failed and I Can't Get Up!"	**Portia and Maurica**, Jones and Laura, Chris and Shelby	Brian Posehn	March 26, 2021
46	6	"Can't Believe It's Cake!"	**Susan and Chrissy**, Caitlynn and Logan, Omefa and Toni	ASAP Ferg	March 26, 2021

=== Season 6 (2021) ===
No. overall	No. in season	Title	Contestants	Guest judge	Original release date
47	1	"Im-Paw-sible Cakes"	**Tina**, Laqueda, and Kendal	Wayne Brady	September 15, 2021
48	2	"Paranormal Pastries"	Jack McBrayer, Thara, **McKenzie**	Sam Richardson	September 15, 2021
49	3	"C’est Jacques!"	**Alpin**, Patricia, Julia	Big Freedia	September 15, 2021
50	4	"History in the Baking"	**Allison, Jon, & Joe** (Nailed It!'s first three way tie)	Sasheer Zamata	September 15, 2021
51	5	"There's a Party in My Mouth!"	Maddy, Adam, **Josh**	Reggie Watts	September 15, 2021
52	6	"Everyone Romaine Calm"	Teri, **Raaya**, Thanh	June Diane Raphael	September 15, 2021

=== Season 7: Halloween (2022) ===
No. overall	No. in season	Title	Contestants	Guest judge	Original release date
53	1	"Cobra Kai"	**LaJeanne**, Candice, Gianni	Mary Mouser	October 5, 2022
54	2	"The Witcher"	**Norm**, Audra, Marcus	Tone Bell	October 5, 2022
55	3	"Umbrella Academy"	**Charles**, Erika, Tao	Emmy Raver-Lampman	October 5, 2022
56	4	"Slime Time"	Phil, **Helen**, Justin	Chelsea Peretti	October 5, 2022

=== The Big Nailed It Baking Challenge (2023) ===
Contestants were in three categories: the top after receiving positive critiques; safe after receiving no critiques; or in the bottom after receiving negative critiques. Bolded top contestants won the bake; italicized bottom contents were eliminated.

No. overall	No. in season	Title	Contestants	Guest judge	Original release date
57	1	"Baking 101"	Top: **Ignoisio**, Emily, Cura; Safe: Richard, Frank, Travis, Jean; Bottom: Georgina, Angie, Andy	Ron Funches	August 4, 2023
58	2	"Fruit Follies"	Top: **Richard**, Ignoisio, Travis; Safe: Georgina, Frank, Emily, Angie; Bottom: Cura, Jean	Vanessa Bayer	August 4, 2023
59	3	"Fondant Fails"	Top: **Ignoisio**, Richard; Safe: Georgina, Frank, Travis, Angie; Bottom: Emily, Cura	Patton Oswalt	August 4, 2023
60	4	"Piping Perfection"	Safe: Ignoisio, Georgina, Richard, Frank, Emily, Travis, Angie	–	August 4, 2023
61	5	"Ya Not Done!"	Top: **Georgina**, Ignoisio, Emily; Safe: Frank, Travis; Bottom: Richard, Angie	Bobby Moynihan	August 4, 2023
62	6	"Bakers Blast Off"	Top: **Georgina**, Emily; Safe: Ignoisio, Frank; Bottom: Richard, Travis	London Hughes	August 4, 2023
63	7	"Defying Gravity"	Top: **Ignoisio**, Richard, Frank; Bottom: Georgina, Emily	Casey Wilson	August 4, 2023
64	8	"Professor Chocolate"	Top: **Ignoisio**, Richard; Bottom: Georgina, Frank	Angela Kinsey	August 4, 2023
65	9	"Second Chances"	Top: **Ignoisio**; Bottom: Georgina, Richard	Alyse Whitney	August 4, 2023
66	10	"Finale"	Top: **Ignoisio**; Bottom: Georgina	Jack McBrayer	August 4, 2023
