= Niquelao! =

Spanish reality bake-off competition show

- Also known as: Nailed It! Spain
- Genre: Reality competition
- Based on: Nailed It!
- Presented by: La Terremoto de Alcorcón
- Judges: La Terremoto de Alcorcón; Christian Escribà
- Country of origin: Spain
- Original language: Spanish
- No. of seasons: 1
- No. of episodes: 6

Production
- Camera setup: Multi-camera
- Running time: 60 minutes

Original release
- Network: Netflix
- Release: 25 October 2019

Related
- Nailed It! France; Nailed It! Germany

Niquelao! (sometimes called Nailed It! Spain) is a Spanish reality competition streaming television series, that premiered on 25 October 2019 through Netflix. In the series, three amateur bakers compete to replicate complicated cakes and confectionery in order to win a €5,000 cash prize and a Niquelao! trophy. This baking reality competition show is a Spanish adaptation of the American show, Nailed It!

== Background ==
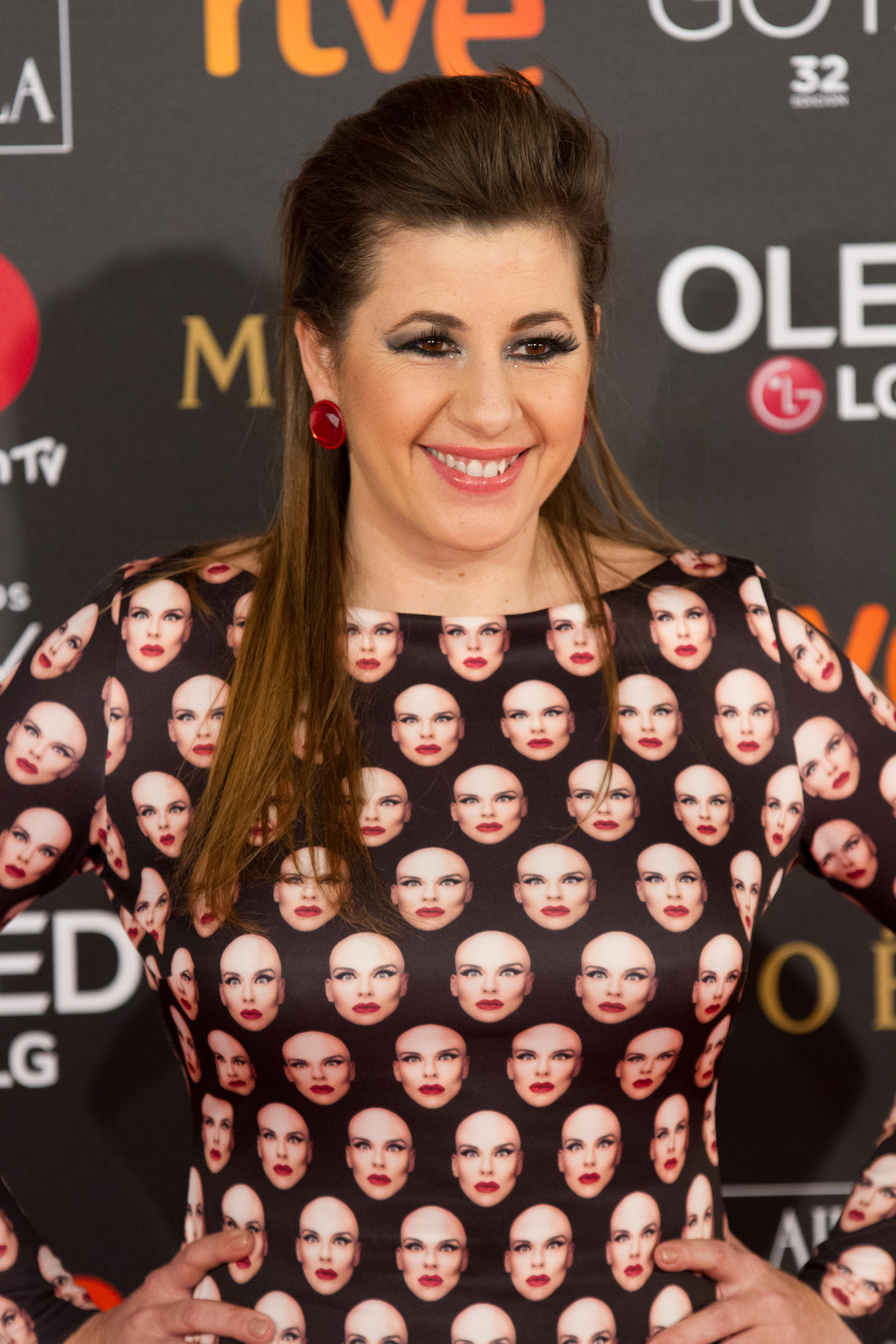
Spanish actress, La Terremoto de Alcorcón, as the host and judge for Niquelao!

=== Production ===
After the success of both shows: Nailed It! and ¡Nailed it! México, Deadline confirmed that three new international spin-offs were in the making by Netflix. The three countries are: France, Spain, and Germany. Spanish singer and actress La Terremoto de Alcorcón was confirmed to be the host and judge for the Spanish show, with pastry chef Christian Escribà, as a judge.

=== Release ===
All six episodes of the first season were released on Netflix on 25 October 2019.

== Format ==
The first challenge is called "Agárralo Como Puedas" (in English: "Baker's Choice"), where the contestants pick one of three existing confectionery treats and try to recreate it. The winner of this challenge gets a special prize and is allowed to wear a golden chef's hat.

In the second challenge, "Niquelao o Aniquilao" (in English: "Nail It or Fail It"), the three contestants have a maximum of two hours to recreate a complicated cake from scratch. They each receive an "SOS Button", which allows them to get three minutes of assistance from one of the judges. The worst-performing baker from the first challenge gets a second button to distract the other bakers. The judges decide on the winning cake based on presentation and taste. The winner receives a Niquelao! trophy and the €5,000 cash prize.

== Episodes ==
=== Season 1 (2019) ===
No. in season	Title	Contestants	Original release date
1	"Érase Una Vez" "Once Upon a Time"	Alina, Alba, Teo	25 October 2019
Guest Judge: Jordi Cruz
2	"Goooool!" "Goal!"	Celso, Elana, Kerme	25 October 2019
Guest Judge: Irene Junquera
3	"¡Ay Paquita!" "Oh Paquita!"	Patricia, Xavi, Mónica	25 October 2019
Guest Judges: Yolanda Ramos and Mariona Terés
4	"Abracadabra"	TBA	25 October 2019
Guest Judge: Mago Karim
5	"Alta Costura" "High Fashion Cakes"	TBA	25 October 2019
Guest Judge: Cristina Rodríguez
5	"¡Oído Cocina!" "Pie-ella Up!"	TBA	25 October 2019
Guest Judge: Paula Gonu
