= Jordi Cruz (presenter) =

Spanish television presenter (born 1976)

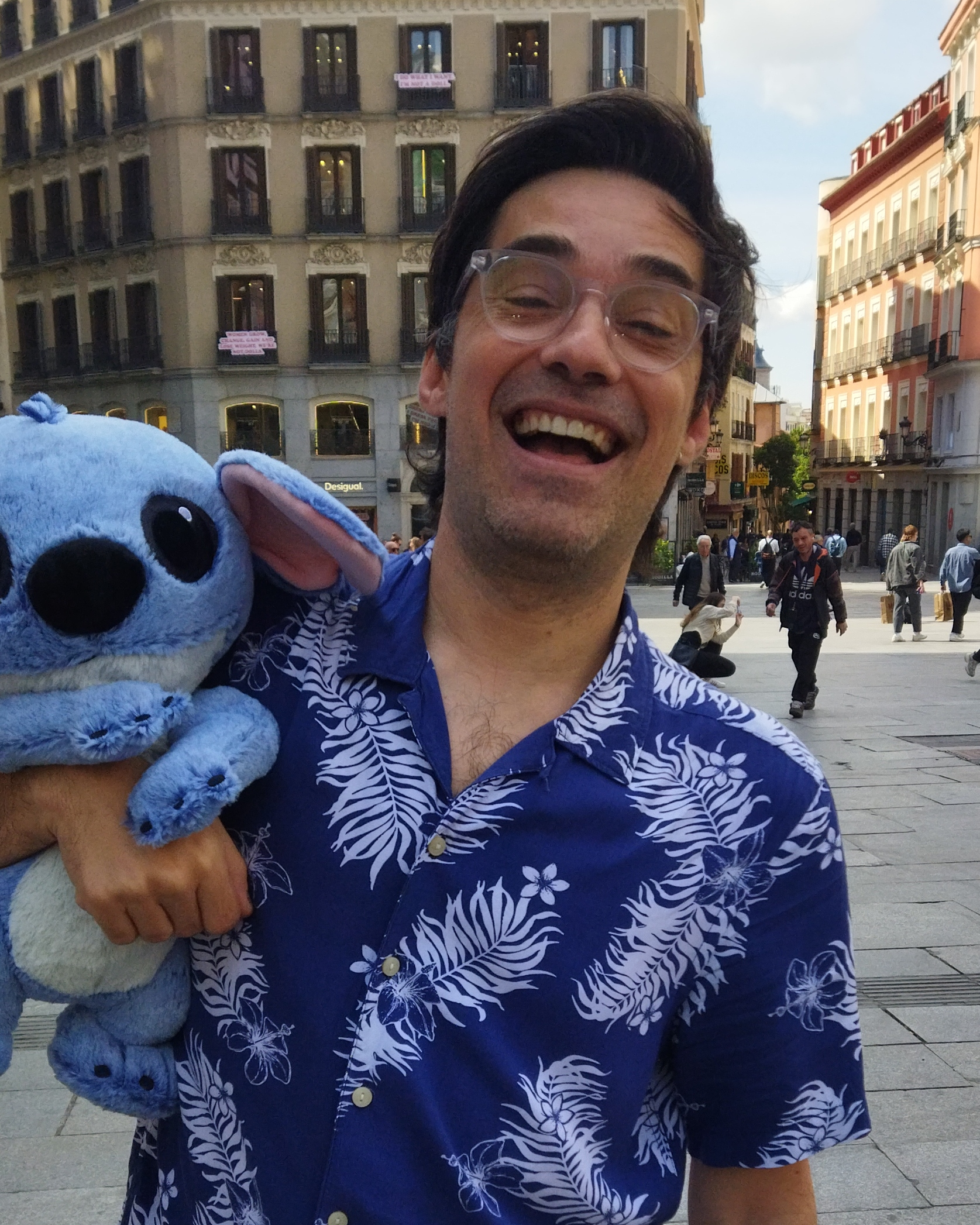
- Cruz in 2025
- Born: Jordi Cruz Pérez; 14 October 1976 (age 49); Barcelona, Catalonia, Spain
- Occupation: Television presenter
- Years active: 1996–present

Jordi Cruz Pérez (born 14 October 1976) is a Spanish television presenter, known for presenting the show Art Attack. He has also been a presenter on the radio station Cadena 100. Since December 2020, he has presented the podcast ¿Sigues ahí? for Netflix.

== Biography ==
Cruz began his presenting career at 19 as a painter, when he was signed onto the children's show Club Disney for TVE, which then switched to Telecinco after a year.

His major role on Club Disney garnered him massive popularity among the younger audience, as well as his castmates, Vanessa Martyn, David Carrillo, Jimmy Castro and Elena Jiménez.

In September 1998, Cruz began presenting another children's show, Art Attack on the Disney Channel, an arts and crafts show aimed at younger children, which ran until 2004. Subsequently, he starred on the show El rayo ("The Lightning"), with Inma del Moral.

In 2005, Cruz moved to other well-known children's programmes, including an eight year run with the show Jordi: Megatrix on Antena 3. His castmate was the singer Natalia Rodríguez until 2007, when he became the show's sole presenter.

In 2009, he presented the musical competition show Número 1 on Neox.

Cruz has also worked as a voice actor, providing the Spanish language dubbing for character including Flik in A Bug's Life and Fred Weasley in the Harry Potter film series and video games.

In 2013, he took over the morning programming on Radio Calviá. He was also a presenter on the station Cadena 100.

In 2019, Cruz appeared as a judge in an episode of the bake-off programme Niquelao!, alongside Terremoto de Alcorcón. This show is an adaptation of Netflix's Nailed It!.

Since 2020, he has presented the show Top Gamers Academy on Neox. In December 2020, he began co-presenting the podcast ¿Sigues ahí? for Netflix.
