= The Tribune (McGill) =

Student newspaper in Quebec, Canada

- Type: Student newspaper
- Format: Compact
- Owner: Tribune Publication Society
- Founded: 1981; 45 years ago
- Headquarters: 3480, rue McTavish; Suite 110; Montreal, Quebec; H3A 0E7
- Circulation: 2,000
- Website: www.thetribune.ca

The Tribune, formerly known as The McGill Tribune is an independent campus newspaper published by the Tribune Publication Society at McGill University in Montreal, Quebec, Canada.

In March 2010, following a student referendum, the Tribune severed its ties with the Students' Society of McGill University (SSMU), which had previously published the newspaper. The newspaper is now published by the Tribune Publication Society - a non-profit, independent students' society.

In April 2023, the newspaper dropped 'McGill' from its name and became known as simply 'The Tribune' in an effort to distance itself from the legacy of James McGill, a known enslaver. In an April 12 editorial titled "We're changing our name. McGill should, too." the 2022-23 editorial board stated that "The Tribune has in the past been guilty of institutional racism, and as we continue working towards redress and strive to eliminate all forms of institutionalized oppression, our Editorial Board feels it can no longer bear the name that so unapologetically upholds and honours these systems."

== Notable alumni ==
- Gail Simmons, Top Chef judge, host Top Chef: Just Desserts and contributor to Food and Wine Magazine
- Christian Lander, founder of the Stuff White People Like blog
- Byron Tau, Wall Street Journal reporter
- Tim Mak, NPR reporter

== See also ==
- The McGill Daily
- List of student newspapers in Canada
- List of newspapers in Canada
