= Top Chef: Just Desserts =

American television series

- Genre: Reality competition; Cooking show
- Starring: Gail Simmons; Johnny Iuzzini; Hubert Keller; Dannielle Kyrillos
- Country of origin: United States
- No. of seasons: 2
- No. of episodes: 20

Production
- Executive producers: Dan Cutforth; Jane Lipsitz
- Producer: Clara Bottoms
- Running time: 43 minutes
- Production company: Magical Elves

Original release
- Network: Bravo
- Release: September 15, 2010 – October 26, 2011

Top Chef: Just Desserts is an American reality competition show, spun off from Top Chef. It premiered on the cable television network Bravo on September 15, 2010. Top Chef: Just Desserts features pastry chefs competing in a series of culinary challenges, focusing on pastries and desserts. The show is produced by Magical Elves Productions, the same company that created Top Chef and Project Runway, and distributed by Bravo and Tiger Aspect USA. It is hosted by Gail Simmons, with head judge Johnny Iuzzini, head pastry chef at Jean-Georges. Other judges include Hubert Keller, owner of restaurant Fleur de Lys and a Top Chef Masters finalist, and Dannielle Kyrillos, "an entertaining expert and editor-at-large of DailyCandy".

== Format ==
In every episode of Top Chef: Just Desserts, there are two challenges: a Quickfire Challenge and an Elimination Challenge. The Quickfire Challenge is a short challenge that tests each contestant's fundamental skills. The Elimination Challenge is usually more difficult and tests the chefs' creativity and adaptability in using specific ingredients or fulfilling a certain client's needs.

== Seasons ==
Season	Original air dates	Winner	Runner(s)-up		Fan Favorite
1	September 15 – November 17, 2010	Yigit Pura	Morgan Wilson	Danielle Keene	Yigit Pura
2	August 24 – October 26, 2011	Chris Hanmer	Matthew Petersen	Sally Camacho	Matthew Petersen

=== Season 1 ===
This was the first season of the spin-off show for Top Chef. The series premiered on September 15 and concluded on November 17, 2010. The winner of season one was Yigit Pura.

=== Season 2 ===
A second season was announced on February 3, 2011. The show premiered on August 24, 2011. The second season had 10 episodes and the finale aired on October 26, 2011. Chris Hanmer was declared the winner.
