= Amirah Kassem =

Mexican-American baker and media personality (born 1987

- Born: January 8, 1987 (age 39); El Paso, Texas
- Occupation: Baker

Amirah Kassem (born January 8, 1987) is an American-born baker, author, designer, and media personality, best known as the owner and founder of FLOUR SHOP and a judge on the Disney+ food-art series Foodtastic. Her kitchen, table, home, and clothing products are sold worldwide.

Amirah specializes in sculpting custom cakes without the use of fondant and is also known for her "Explosion Cake." Her Cara the Unicorn Explosion Cake was featured as Instagram's most memorable trend of 2017. She is also the author of The Power of Sprinkles: A Cake Book and the children's titles The Magical Land of Birthdays series and the board book Bake a Rainbow Cake!

== Early life and education ==
Kassem was born in El Paso, Texas, to a Kuwaiti father and a Mexican mother, and grew up in Juárez, Mexico, where she learned to bake from both her mother and grandmother. She moved back to El Paso at the age of 9 with her parents. She attended Loretto Academy and the Fashion Institute of Design & Merchandising in Los Angeles.

== Career ==
=== Flour Shop ===
In 2012 Kassem left the fashion industry to set up a high-concept bakery, Flour Shop, becoming known for unusually shaped cakes in the shapes of cheeseburgers, pizzas, buckets of popcorn, and the well-known 'Explosion Cake.' The company specializes in creating baked goods without the use of fondant icing.

Flour Shop opened their flagship store in SoHo, New York, in November 2017 and in Beverly Hills, California, in August 2020. Her clients have included Kim Kardashian, Katy Perry, and Beyonce, as well as brands likes Vans, Louis Vuitton, and Alice + Olivia.

Amirah has headlined food festivals like BottleRock, Food and Wine Festival, New York City Wine and Food Festival and Catskills Festival.

=== Television ===
Amirah will be starring as a judge in the upcoming Disney+ food-art series Foodtastic. The show is set to air later in 2021 and is hosted by Keke Palmer. She has also frequently been featured as a guest judge on many food shows, including: Sugar Rush, Cupcake Championship, Nailed It! Mexico, Beat Bobby Flay, Cake My Day and Top Elf.

=== Books ===
Amirah has released a cookbook, two children's fiction books, a board book, and a calendar. Her cake book, The Power of Sprinkles, reached No. 1 on Amazon in Celebrity & TV Show Cookbooks and Cake Baking Books and peaked at No. 57 in Books on the Amazon Best Sellers Rank.

Her middle-grade series, The Magical Land of Birthdays, follows a ten-year-old Amirah as she receives a magical cookbook. Amirah is transported to the Magical Land of Birthdays, where she meets three of her birthday buddies from different corners of the world—kids who share her exact birthday and are also about to turn 11. Amirah also coined the term "b-buds" (short for birthday buddies) for this series, which refers to anyone that shares the same birthday.

=== Press ===
Amirah and her products have been featured on the cover of Bon Appétit, Refinery29, Food & Wine, and other publications. She has also made many guest appearances on television, including TODAY, The Tonight Show Starring Jimmy Fallon, Late Night with Seth Meyers, The Rachael Ray Show, The Drew Barrymore Show and Home & Family.

=== Art ===
Amirah Kassem works frequently on collaborations with photographer Henry Hargreaves. Their work includes "Burning Calories" photo series, which is in a gallery in Venice, Italy, as of November 2013. Kassem and Hargreaves also collaborated on a photo series in celebration of the Wu Tang Clan's 20th anniversary for the Wu Tang Brand.

Amirah's work has also been featured in the Whitney Museum and the Brooklyn Museum. In 2015, when the Brooklyn Museum celebrated Takashi Murakami, Amirah used 10,000 gumballs to create her own art installation, reinterpreting the Murakami flower.

=== Design ===
In 2019 Kassem designed and launched a worldwide kitchen, table, and food collection with Williams-Sonoma. Her line of FLOUR SHOP kitchen and table wares was called "playful and chic" as well as a "refined rainbow" by Elle Decor.

In late 2019 Kassem also designed and launched a home collection with Pottery Barn brands, mostly focusing on Pottery Barn Kids. The FLOUR SHOP collection was sold worldwide and included decor, bedding, and tabletop items.

In 2020, Kassem designed and launched a Vans limited edition fashion line in both footwear and clothing. The FLOUR SHOP collection spans kids, women, and men's departments in footwear, clothing, and accessories.

=== Fashion ===
Amirah Kassem began her career in fashion while attending FIDM. She started out working for 7 For All Mankind and Fred Segal. Eventually Kassem moved her way into high fashion through experiences at Interview Magazine and Karl Templer. She then moved to New York City, where she worked alongside Johan Lindeberg in the launch of BLKDNM.

== Personal life ==
Kassem currently resides in Los Angeles with her husband and business partner, Ross "The Boss" Harrow.

== Filmography ==
Year	Title	Role	Notes
2020	Cake My Day	Herself	Co-host
2021	Foodtastic!	Herself/Judge	Main role
2025	The Tiny Chef Show	Herself	Episode: "Fwendsgiving Feast"
