= ¡Nailed it! México =

Reality bake-off competition

- Genre: Reality television
- Based on: Nailed It!
- Starring: Omar Chaparro; Anna Ruiz
- Country of origin: México
- Original language: Spanish
- No. of seasons: 3
- No. of episodes: 18

Production
- Running time: 30–35 minutes
- Production company: Magical Elves

Original release
- Network: Netflix
- Release: 8 February 2019 – 5 January 2021

¡Nailed it! México is a Mexican Netflix original series which premiered on February 8, 2019, as a spin-off of Nailed It!. The series is a reality bake-off competition, in the style of reality television. Three amateur bakers compete to replicate complicated cakes and confectionery in order to win a 200,000 pesos cash prize and a "¡Nailed It!" trophy. A second season was released on August 7, 2020. A third season was released on January 5, 2021.

== Premise ==
¡Nailed it! México was inspired by the craze of people trying and failing to make elaborate cakes they found on the Internet. Three amateur bakers with demonstrated poor baking skills attempt to re-create edible masterpieces for a $10,000 prize and the "¡Nailed it!" trophy. Competitors take part in two challenges over the course of the 35-minute episodes; their efforts are judged by co-hosts Omar Chaparro and Anna Ruiz, joined by a different guest judge each episode.

The first challenge is called "Baker's Choice", where the contestants pick one of three existing confectionery treats and try to recreate it. The winner of this challenge gets a special prize and is allowed to wear a golden chef's hat.

In the second challenge, "Nail It or Fail It", contestants have two hours to recreate a complicated cake from scratch. They each receive a "Panic Button" which allows them to get three minutes of assistance from one of the judges. The worst-performing baker from the first challenge gets a second button to distract the other bakers.

== Cast ==
- Omar Chaparro, host
- Anna Ruiz, host

== Episodes ==
Season	Episodes	Originally released
1	6	February 8, 2019
2	6	August 7, 2020
3	6	January 5, 2021

The winners of the 200,000 pesos and the "¡Nailed It!" trophy each episode are listed in bold.

=== Season 1 (2019) ===
No. overall	No. in season	Title	Contestants	Guest judge	Original release date
1	1	"Birthday Blunders"	**Denisse Tames**, Armando Romero Guillot, Patricia Camarena	Ricardo O'Farrill	February 8, 2019
Contestants create smashed piñata cakes and ambitious quinceañera centrepieces, but a can opener may be one competitor's undoing.
2	2	"Blood, Sweet and Tiers"	**Jana Soar**, Andrea Infante Covarrubias, José Ricardo Rasillo	Psycho Clown	February 8, 2019
With luchador Psycho Clown watching, the bakers struggle to make cake pops in the form of masked wrestlers and a dessert shaped like a soccer stadium.
3	3	"For Butter or Worse"	**Itziar Ambas**, Rosa Lillia Colmenero, Natalia Huidobro Guzmán	Sylvia Weinstock	February 8, 2019
There's so much drama in two telenovela-inspired challenges overseen by famed baker Sylvia Weinstock as bowls break, cookies crumble and wedding cakes teeter.
4	4	"Party Foul"	**Roberto Servín**, Rosario Marthen, Estela Valencia	Aquiles Chavez	February 8, 2019
Happy hour turns sad when tequila-infused cocktail cupcakes go wrong; the afterparty spins into hilarity with a DJ-topped turntable cake.
5	5	"Sweet Explosion"	**Liliana Miselem**, Diego Adame, Karla María Rodriguez Aguilar	Amirah Kassem	February 8, 2019
In a colourful celebration of childhood that would make any kid cry, the befuddled bakers attempt to make rainbow doughnuts and a candy-laden cake.
6	6	"Fails from the Crypt"	**Carlos Pont**, Ricardo Velázquez García, Ana Belén Lara Camacho	José Ramón Castillo	February 8, 2019
For once, the horror begins before the cooking starts; to impress the Willy Wonka of Mexico, the bakers sculpt scary monsters, including a Chupacabra.

=== Season 2 (2020) ===
No. overall	No. in season	Title	Contestants	Guest judge	Original release date
7	1	"Space Oddities"	TBA	Capi Pérez	August 7, 2020
Capi Pérez captains a mission as the contestants make space doughnuts and alien cakes.
8	2	"Flop Art"	TBA	Adal Ramones	August 7, 2020
The bakers transform works of art into miserable looking edibles. Guest judge Adal Ramones brings the laughs.
9	3	"Parade of Fails"	Andrea Lepe, Jorge Zamarripa, Tali Mateos	Viviana Serna	August 7, 2020
Poorly baked oatmeal cookies shaped as weird-looking carnival masks; Scary funfetti-filled float cakes creep out the judges.
10	4	"Daft Craft"	TBA	TBA	August 7, 2020
Cositas encourages the bakers to craft cakes inspired by Maria dolls and an armadillo alebrije.
11	5	"On the Dance-flour"	TBA	Verónica Toussaint	August 7, 2020
Elvis finds himself planted on top of a disco ball cake in 70s attire. To top it off, he is framed with hair made out of cookies.
12	6	"Sink or Swim"	TBA	Daniel Sosa	August 7, 2020
A common doughnut is blown to pieces as the bakers create animal pool floats. They pull off their best attempts at bad party-boat cakes.

=== Season 3 (2021) ===
No. overall	No. in season	Title	Contestants	Guest judge	Original release date
13	1	"God of Disasters"	TBA	TBA	January 5, 2021
The contestants look for divine inspiration while crafting unusual deities out of cake.
14	2	"Baking Cemetery"	TBA	TBA	January 5, 2021
The bakers struggle to craft desserts inspired by the queen of the underworld, much to the judges' delight.
15	3	"Fairy Fails"	TBA	TBA	January 5, 2021
A fairy-tale inspired challenge sends the bakers into turmoil over their hapless ways in the kitchen.
16	4	"F is for Fail"	TBA	TBA	January 5, 2021
The contestants hit the books for a back-to-school themed cookie challenge.
17	5	"Super Fails"	TBA	TBA	January 5, 2021
The bakers try to tap into their unique abilities to craft superhero-inspired treats.
18	6	"Funny Bakes"	TBA	TBA	January 5, 2021
Things quickly get out of control in the kitchen when someone drops their latest cake creation.

== Release ==
All six episodes of the first season were released on Netflix on February 8, 2019; Sylvia Weinstock appears in one episode as a guest judge. The second season was released on Netflix on August 7, 2020. The third season was released on January 5, 2021, with six episodes.
