= Top Chef: Just Desserts season 2 =

Season of television series

Top Chef: Just Desserts
- Season 2
- No. of contestants: 14
- Winner: Chris Hanmer
- No. of episodes: 10

Release
- Original network: Bravo
- Original release: August 24 – October 26, 2011

Season chronology
- ← Previous; Season 1

The second season of Top Chef: Just Desserts was broadcast on Bravo. It featured 14 pastry chefs fighting to win the title of Top Chef.

== Contestants ==
Names and hometowns below are from the Bravo website. In the order eliminated:

| Name | Age | Current Residence | Hometown | Finish | Place | Wins |
|---|---|---|---|---|---|---|
| Lina Biancamano | 37 | Fort Worth, Texas | Phoenix, Arizona | Episode 1 | 14 | 0 |
| Vanarin Kuch | 26 | Houston, Texas | Houston, Texas | Episode 2 | 13 | 0 |
| Nelson Paz | 33 | Boston, Massachusetts | Buenos Aires, Argentina | Episode 3 | 12 | 1 |
| Craig Poirier | 25 | Las Vegas, Nevada | Derry, New Hampshire | Episode 4 | 11-10 | 1 |
| Melissa Camacho | 30 | New York, New York | Port-au-Prince, Haiti | Episode 4 | 11-10 | 2 |
| Amanda Rockman | 29 | Chicago, Illinois | Katy, Texas | Episode 5 | 9 | 2 |
| Rebecca Masson | 39 | Houston, Texas | Laramie, Wyoming | Episode 6 | 8 | 0 |
| Megan Ketover | 31 | Cincinnati, Ohio | Cincinnati, Ohio | Episode 7 | 7 | 2 |
| Katzie Guy-Hamilton | 24 | New York, New York | Worcester, Massachusetts | Episode 7 | 6 | 3 |
| Carlos Enriquez | 33 | Las Vegas, Nevada | Los Angeles, California | Episode 8 | 5 | 5 |
| Orlando Santos† | 32 | Pittsburgh, Pennsylvania | Saint Croix, U.S. Virgin Islands | Episode 9 | 4 | 1 |
| Matthew Petersen | 32 | Arlington, Virginia | Dublin, Pennsylvania | Episode 10 | 3-2(Fan Favorite) | 5 |
| Sally Camacho | 31 | Los Angeles, California | Los Angeles, California | Episode 10 | 3-2 | 4 |
| Chris Hanmer | 33 | Las Vegas, Nevada | Costa Mesa, California | Episode 10 | 1 | 4 |

== Contestant Progress ==
| Contestant | 1 | 2 | 3 | 4 | 5 | 6 | 7 | 8 | 9 | Finale |
|---|---|---|---|---|---|---|---|---|---|---|
| Quickfire; Winner(s) | Amanda; Nelson | Matthew | Craig | None^{1} | Sally | Sally | Carlos^{1} | Carlos^{1} | None^{1} | None |
| Chris | WIN | WIN | WIN | IN | IN (-) | HIGH | LOW | LOW | HIGH | WINNER |
| Sally | HIGH | HIGH | LOW | LOW | IN (-) | HIGH | WIN | HIGH | WIN | RUNNER-UP |
| Matthew | WIN | WIN | IN (-) | HIGH | IN (-) | WIN | LOW | WIN | LOW | RUNNER-UP |
| Orlando | HIGH | LOW | LOW | IN | LOW | IN | WIN | LOW | OUT | |
| Carlos | WIN | HIGH | WIN | HIGH | LOW | IN | WIN | OUT | | |
| Katzie | LOW | LOW | WIN | WIN | WIN | LOW | OUT | | | |
| Megan | LOW | WIN | WIN | LOW | HIGH | LOW | OUT^{2} | | | |
| Rebecca | HIGH | HIGH | IN (-) | IN | HIGH | OUT | | | | |
| Amanda | WIN | LOW | WIN | IN | OUT | | | | | |
| Melissa | LOW | WIN | WIN | OUT | | | | | | |
| Craig | LOW | LOW | LOW | OUT | | | | | | |
| Nelson | HIGH | LOW | OUT | | | | | | | |
| Vanarin | LOW | OUT | | | | | | | | |
| Lina | OUT | | | | | | | | | |

^Note 1: The chefs did not receive immunity by winning the quickfire challenge.

^Note 2: Megan was eliminated by placing last in the Quickfire Challenge.

(WINNER) The chef won the season and was awarded the title Top Chef.
(RUNNER-UP) The chef was a runner-up for the season.
(WIN) The chef won that episode's Elimination Challenge.
(HIGH) The chef was selected as one of the top entries in the Elimination Challenge, but did not win.
(LOW) The chef was selected as one of the bottom entries in the Elimination Challenge, but was not eliminated.
(OUT) The chef lost that week's Elimination Challenge and was out of the competition.
(IN) The chef neither won nor lost that week's Elimination Challenge. They also were not up to be eliminated.
[IN (+)] The chef won a pair or team challenge but was not chosen as one of the judges' favorites.
[IN (-)] The chef lost a pair or team challenge but was not selected as one of the judges' least favorites.

== Episodes ==
Each episode includes two challenges. The Quickfire Challenge is a short, simple challenge with a varying reward each week; in the initial episodes of the season, it usually guarantees the winner immunity from being sent home that week; however, in the latter stages, the Quickfire winner is given an advantage in the upcoming Elimination Challenge. It also has been made clear that Quickfire winners this season may receive other rewards, including cash prizes. The Elimination Challenge is a more complex challenge that determines who goes home. One or more judges join the show each week to evaluate both the Quickfire and Elimination challenges. Each week's elimination is announced in a segment called "Judges' Table."

=== Episode 1: Showpiece ===
- Quickfire Challenge: The 14 pastry chefs are asked to divide into seven teams of two and create an updated soda-fountain dessert.

- Top: Carlos & Rebecca, Amanda & Nelson
- Bottom: Megan & Orlando, Lina & Craig
  - WINNERS: Amanda & Nelson (Chocolate Sponge Cake, Pickled Cherries, Whipped Cream & Pistachios)

- Elimination Challenge: The chefs are divided into four groups and are tasked with making a dessert based on a classic fairy tale, as well as a showpiece dessert. Amanda and Nelson, as the quickfire winners, get to choose their group.

Goldilocks and the Three Bears: Nelson, Orlando, Sally & Rebecca
Hansel and Gretel: Melissa, Lina & Vanarin
Jack and the Beanstalk: Craig, Katzie & Megan
Little Red Riding Hood: Amanda, Carlos, Chris & Matthew

- WINNERS: Little Red Riding Hood (Rose Scented Bomboloni, Coconut Tapioca & Red Berry Gélee; Blackout Sponge Cake, Cocoa Nib Nougatine, Poached Cherries & Micro Basil)
- ELIMINATED: Lina of Hansel and Gretel (Chocolate Cloud, Milk Sherbet & Hibiscus Apple Seltzer)

- Guest Judge:
- Original Airdate: August 24, 2011

=== Episode 2: Sweet Symphony ===
- Quickfire Challenge: The 13 remaining pastry chefs must make a dessert featuring lemons.

- Top: Matthew, Katzie, Carlos
- Bottom: Nelson, Orlando, Amanda
  - WINNER: Matthew (Lemon vanilla creme with mint puree and hazelnut sable)

- Elimination Challenge: The chefs are divided into four teams and told to create a three or four-tier cake for a party celebrating the orchestra at the Walt Disney Concert Hall. Each team member is responsible for one tier of the cake.

Black Team: Orlando, Nelson, Craig
Green Team: Carlos, Sally, Rebecca
Blue Team: Amanda, Katzie, Vanarin
Red Team: Matthew, Chris, Megan, Melissa

- WINNER: Red Team (Matthew: Lemon pound cake with almond dacquoise; Chris: Chocolate sponge cake with praline jam; Megan: Yellow butter cake with honey caramel cream, red fruit preserves and mocha; Melissa: Cardamom sponge cake with ginger cream and strawberry jam)
- ELIMINATED: Vanarin of Blue Team (Yellow cake in smoked salted caramel with pistachio buttercream)

- Guest Judge: Margaret Braun
- Original Airdate: August 31, 2011

=== Episode 3: Villa Rosa ===
- Quickfire Challenge: Come up with a small dessert to inspire a new flavor of Extra Dessert Delights Gum. The winner receives immunity, an opportunity to have their dessert be a new flavor of gum and $25,000.

- Top: Craig, Nelson, Carlos
- Bottom: Rebecca, Melissa, Matthew
  - WINNER: Craig (Mascarpone pancakes with cream and amaretto strawberries)

- Elimination Challenge: The chefs are split into two teams of six and told to create a dessert table pitch for the second-anniversary party for Villa Blanca. Craig, as the Quickfire winner, gets to determine the two team leaders and picks himself and Amanda.

- WINNER: Team Amanda (Amanda: Cava gelee with buttermilk foam and a fizzy raspberry, Carlos: Guava pate de fruit, fromage blanc and phillo cigar, Chris: Almond strawberry tart with rosewater push pop, Katzie: French macaroon with homemade strawberry jam and mint sauce, Megan: Pink velvet cake with chocolate mousse, cherries, and cream cheese sorbet, Melissa: White chocolate brownie with rose gelee and rhubarb foam)
- ELIMINATED: Nelson of Team Craig (Cotton candy-dipped passion fruit cheesecake lollipop)

- Guest Judge: Hugh Acheson
- Original Airdate: September 7, 2011

=== Episode 4: Pure Imagination ===
- Quickfire Challenge: None. In lieu of a Quickfire, the 11 remaining chefs were treated to a screening of Willy Wonka and the Chocolate Factory, at the end of which Gail gave them their Elimination Challenge.
- Elimination Challenge: Working as one large team, the chefs had to create a candy world at which four members of the movie's original cast, Julie Dawn Cole (Veruca Salt), Paris Themmen (Mike Teevee), Denise Nickerson (Violet Beauregarde) and Peter Ostrum (Charlie Bucket), would be guests.

- WINNER: Katzie (Carrot Cake Patch and Honey Cake Beehive)
- ELIMINATED: Craig (Giant Gummy Bears) and Melissa (Green Donuts and Whoopie Pie Daisies)

- Guest Judge: Ron Ben-Israel
- Original Airdate: September 14, 2011

=== Episode 5: Make A Splash ===
- Quickfire Challenge: Create a brand-new candy bar from scratch. Winner receives immunity.

- Top: Sally, Rebecca
- Bottom: Matthew, Katzie
  - WINNER: Sally ("Who's It?" Candy Bar: Milk Chocolate Ganache with Black Forbidden Rice, Cocoa Nibs & Ovaltine)

- Elimination Challenge: The teams draw popsicles, which divides them into three groups of three. The teams must create refreshing summer treats to serve guests at a waterpark.

Blue team: Carlos, Sally, Amanda
Orange team: Matthew, Chris, Orlando
Green team: Rebecca, Katzie, Megan

- WINNER: Katzie (Baked Alaska with spumoni twist)
- ELIMINATED: Amanda (Funnel cake with coconut sorbet and pineapple jam)

- Guest Judge: Pichet Ong
- Original Airdate: September 21, 2011

=== Episode 6: Sabotage ===
- Quickfire Challenge: The chefs are randomly assigned a root vegetable and must transform it into a dessert. Winner receives immunity and $5,000. Chris was disqualified during judging for keeping his garnish off until serving.

- Top: Sally, Matthew
- Bottom: Rebecca, Carlos
  - WINNER: Sally (Mango pudding with turmeric and curried popcorn)

- Elimination Challenge: Using three savory food items from Beastie Boys songs (two chosen by themselves, one chosen by a fellow chef), the chefs must come up with a dessert served at a street art show.

- WINNER: Matthew (Cornbread & mashed potato cheesecake, whiskey caramel and gravy foam)
- ELIMINATED: Rebecca (Falafal panna cotta with ham pecan cumin brittle and 40 oz. ice cream)

- Guest Judge: Ad-Rock
- Original Airdate: September 28, 2011

=== Episode 7: Death By Chocolate ===
- Quickfire Challenge: Create the perfect doughnut, to be served with a cup of coffee. The winner receives $10,000, but no immunity; the worst doughnut will be sent home.

- Top: Sally, Carlos
- Bottom: Megan, Matthew, Orlando
  - WINNER: Carlos (Orange and Lemon Zest Bombolines with Passion Fruit Cream)
  - ELIMINATED: Megan (Cake Doughnut with Honey Cardamom Glaze)

- Elimination Challenge: Following Megan's elimination, the remaining six chefs are divided into two teams of three, each of whom has to create a chocolate showpiece. Each chef also has to create an individual chocolate dessert.

Blue Team: Orlando, Carlos, Sally
Red Team: Chris, Matthew, Katzie

- WINNER: Blue Team (Orlando: Puff Pastry, Milk Chocolate Mousse and Mango Coulis; Carlos: Milk Chocolate Mousse, Peanut Butter Mousse and Caramelized Banana; Sally: Manjari Caramel Mousse, Passion Fruit Gelee and Pineapple Sauce)
- ELIMINATED: Katzie (Boca Negra Cake with Jasmine and Passion Fruit Curd)

- Guest Judge: Wylie Dufresne
- Original Airdate: October 5, 2011

=== Episode 8: Step Right Up ===
- Quickfire Challenge: Create a perfect pie with one hand tied behind your back. Winner receives $5,000. Matthew was disqualified during judging for accidentally using his left hand at one point.

- Top: Orlando, Carlos
- Bottom: Sally, Chris
  - WINNER: Carlos (Raspberry Lemon Meringue Pie)

- Elimination Challenge: Transform a traditional carnival food into an upscale dessert.

- WINNER: Matthew (Apple Pie as Fried Caramel Apple Pie, Apple Carpaccio and Vanilla Ice Cream)
- ELIMINATED: Carlos (Burger and Fries as Sesame Angel Food Cake "Burger", Churro "Fries" and Strawberry Lemon Soda)

- Guest Judge: François Payard
- Original Airdate: October 12, 2011

=== Episode 9: Dessert in Disguise ===
- Quickfire Challenge: None. In lieu of a Quickfire, the final four were immediately given their last elimination challenge.
- Elimination Challenge: Create a dessert in disguise based upon a savory dish from a cuisine of your choosing.

Chris: French
Orlando: Spanish
Matthew: Italian
Sally: Cuban

- WINNER: Sally (Cuban Sandwich as Brioche, Cream Cheese Mousse and Strawberry Caramel Gel with "Potato Salad" (Pineapple, Banana and Asian Pear))
- ELIMINATED: Orlando (Paella as Coconut & Saffron Rice, Tuile, Compressed Plums and Roasted Beets)

- Guest Judge: Cat Cora
- Original Airdate: October 19, 2011

=== Episode 10: Finale ===
- Quickfire Challenge: None.
- Final Challenge: Create a display case that includes a display piece, an entremet cake, a savory bread piece, bonbons and a plated dessert for a special person in the chef's life. Each chef also gets two sous chefs from the eliminated contestants, one chosen at random and one chosen by them.

Chris (sous chefs Rebecca and Amanda)
Display piece: Chocolate with blown sugar flowers
Entremet cake: Chocolate mousse, vanilla cremeux and raspberry jam
Savory bread: Brioche with bacon maple butter
Bonbons: Coffee infused ganache with caramel
Plated dessert: Butter almond cake, banana caramel and banana tuile, banana ice cream and mango passion fruit sauce

Matthew (sous chefs Megan and Carlos)
Display piece: Red blown sugar
Entremet cake: Hazelnut Dacquois, passion fruit gelee, milk jam and whipped java cream
Savory bread: Focaccia with olive oil, fresh thyme and salt
Bonbons: Key lime ganache and speculoos
Plated dessert: Dark chocolate flourless cake, raspberry mousse, pecan streusel and milk ice cream

Sally (sous chefs Vanarin and Orlando)
Display piece: Chocolate with orange chocolate flowers
Entremet cake: Chocolate mousee, mango vanilla cream, caramel cremeux and almond petit fours
Savory bread: Parker house roll with bacon, onions and gruyere cheese
Bonbons: Salted caramel milk chocolate
Plated dessert: White chocolate espresso mousse, chocolate cremeux, cashew nougatine and white chocolate ice cream

- TOP CHEF: Chris
- RUNNERS-UP: Sally and Matthew

- Guest Judge: None
- Original Airdate: October 26, 2011

== Ratings ==
=== US ratings ===
| # | Airdate | Episode | Viewers (millions) |
|---|---|---|---|
| 1 | August 24, 2011 | Showpiece | 1.127 |
| 2 | August 31, 2011 | Sweet Symphony | 1.098 |
| 3 | September 7, 2011 | Villa Rosa | 1.065 |
| 4 | September 14, 2011 | Pure Imagination | 1.076 |
| 5 | September 21, 2011 | Make A Splash | 0.942 |
| 6 | September 28, 2011 | Sabotage | 0.988 |
| 7 | October 5, 2011 | Death By Chocolate | 0.981 |
| 8 | October 12, 2011 | Step Right Up | 0.961 |
| 9 | October 19, 2011 | Dessert in Disguise | 1.033 |
| 10 | October 26, 2011 | Finale | 1.243 |
