= Nailed It! =

American reality bake-off competition show

- Genre: Reality television
- Presented by: Nicole Byer; Jacques Torres
- Country of origin: United States
- Original language: English
- No. of seasons: 7 + 3 special seasons
- No. of episodes: 66 (list of episodes)

Production
- Running time: 32–34 minutes
- Production company: Magical Elves

Original release
- Network: Netflix
- Release: March 9, 2018 – October 5, 2022 (On hiatus)

Related
- ¡Nailed it! México; Niquelao!

Nailed It! is an American reality television series that premiered on March 9, 2018. The series is exclusively available on Netflix. The series is a bake-off competition in the style of reality television, where three amateur bakers compete to replicate complicated cakes and confectionery in order to win a $10,000 cash prize and the "Nailed It" trophy.

A second season was released on June 29, 2018. A holiday season, dubbed Nailed It! Holiday!, was released on December 7, 2018. The third season was released on May 17, 2019. A second holiday season of Nailed It! Holiday! was released on November 22, 2019. The fourth season was released on April 1, 2020. The fifth season, dubbed Nailed It! Double Trouble, is the series' first spin-off season that features contestants competing in pairs. It premiered on March 26, 2021. The sixth season was released on September 15, 2021. The seventh season, dubbed Nailed It! Halloween, was released on October 5, 2022.

The spin-off The Big Nailed It Baking Challenge was released on August 4, 2023.

The series has received critical acclaim and was nominated for five Primetime Emmy Awards, including three for Outstanding Competition Program and twice for Outstanding Host for a Reality or Competition Program. The latter nomination made Nicole Byer the first Black woman to be nominated for the award.

== Premise ==
Nailed It! was inspired by the craze of people trying and failing to make elaborate cakes they found on the Internet. Three amateur bakers with demonstrated poor baking skills attempt to re-create edible masterpieces for a $10,000 prize and the Nailed It! trophy. Competitors take part in two challenges over the course of the 35-minute episodes; their efforts are judged by co-hosts Nicole Byer and Jacques Torres, joined by a different guest judge each episode. The "Hero" cakes that the contestants must replicate are created by Charity George: Seasons 1 & 2; Monika Stout and Viki Kane: Seasons 3, 4, 5, Holiday 1 and 2; and Monika Stout and Michelle Boyd: Seasons 6, 7 and The Big Baking Challenge.

The first challenge is called "Baker's Choice", where the contestants pick one of three similar confectionery treats and try to recreate it. The winner of this challenge gets a special prize and is allowed to wear a golden chef's hat.

In the second challenge, "Nail It or Fail It", contestants have two hours to recreate a complicated cake from scratch. They each receive a "Panic Button", which allows them to get three minutes of assistance from one of the judges. The worst-performing baker from the first challenge gets a second button to distract the other bakers – the specific function varies depending on the episode, but normally involves Nicole annoying the bakers. The three judges decide on the winning cake based upon presentation and taste. The winner receives a trophy and the $10,000 prize. However in one episode, celebrity contestant Paul Scheer decided to split the $10,000 between his competitors and keep the trophy and one episode saw three winning contestants.

== Cast ==
- Nicole Byer, host
- Jacques Torres, judge
- Weston "Wes" Bahr, assistant director

== Episodes ==
Season	Episodes	Originally released
1	6	March 9, 2018
2	7	June 29, 2018
Holiday 1	7	December 7, 2018
3	6	May 17, 2019
Holiday 2	6	November 22, 2019
4	8	April 1, 2020
5: Double Trouble	6	March 26, 2021
6	6	September 15, 2021
7: Halloween	4	October 5, 2022
The Big Baking Challenge	10	August 4, 2023

== Release ==
All six episodes of the first season were released exclusively to Netflix on March 9, 2018. The second season features six regular episodes and one bonus episode, and was released on Netflix on June 29, 2018. The season ends with a crossover special, featuring the "Fab Five" of Netflix's Queer Eye series, with the series' food and wine expert Antoni Porowski serving as guest judge. The third season was released on May 17, 2019, with six episodes.

The fourth season was released on April 1, 2020, followed the fifth season premiered on March 26, 2021, and the sixth season on September 15, 2021. Due to the COVID-19 pandemic, the fifth, sixth, and seventh season featured slight differences such as cake selections being done verbally rather than by running towards them, the rectangular judges panel being replaced by a large semi-circle, and the contestants' kitchens being socially-distanced.

On March 1, 2022, it was reported that production on the series was suspended indefinitely after crew members went to strike to secure a contract with the International Alliance of Theatrical Stage Employees. The strike saw the seventh season's episode total halved, as only four of the planned eight episodes had been filmed before the strike commenced.

== Awards and nominations ==
Year	Award	Category	Nominee(s)	Result	Ref.
2018	TCA Awards	Outstanding Achievement in Reality Programming	Nailed It!	Nominated	
2019	TCA Awards	Outstanding Achievement in Reality Programming	Nailed It!	Nominated	
2019	Teen Choice Awards	Choice Summer TV Series	Nailed It!	Nominated	
2019	Primetime Emmy Awards	Outstanding Competition Program	Nailed It!	Nominated	
2020	Primetime Emmy Awards	Outstanding Competition Program	Nailed It!	Nominated	
2020	Primetime Creative Arts Emmy Awards	Outstanding Host for a Reality or Competition Program	Nicole Byer	Nominated	
2021	Artios Awards	Casting for a Reality Series	Samantha Hanks, Shannon McCarty, and Heather Allyn	Nominated	
2021	MTV Unscripted Movie & TV Awards	Best Lifestyle Show	Nailed It!	Won	
2021	MTV Unscripted Movie & TV Awards	Best Host	Nicole Byer	Nominated	
2021	Primetime Emmy Awards	Outstanding Competition Program	Nailed It!	Nominated	
2021	Primetime Creative Arts Emmy Awards	Outstanding Host for a Reality or Competition Program	Nicole Byer	Nominated	
2021	Producers Guild of America Awards	Outstanding Producer of Game & Competition Television	Patrick J. Doody, Gaylen Gawlowski, Casey Kriley, Jo Sharon, Sandra Birdsong, Anika Guldstrand, Cat Sullivan, and Melissa Johnson	Nominated	
2021	TCA Awards	Outstanding Achievement in Reality Programming	Nailed It!	Nominated	
2022	Primetime Emmy Awards	Outstanding Competition Program	Nailed It!	Nominated	
2022	Primetime Creative Arts Emmy Awards	Outstanding Host for a Reality or Competition Program	Nicole Byer	Nominated	
2023	Primetime Creative Arts Emmy Awards	Outstanding Host for a Reality or Competition Program	Nicole Byer	Nominated	

== International versions ==
A Mexican version of the show debuted in February 2019. ¡Nailed it! México is hosted by comedian Omar Chaparro and professional chef Anna Ruiz, along with guest judges. Sylvia Weinstock appears in one episode as a guest judge. A French version of the show debuted in October 2019. C'est du gâteau! is hosted by humorist Artus and professional chef Noémie Honiat, along with guest judges. Jacques Torres appears in one episode as a judge. The Spanish version of the show, Niquelao!, debuted in October 2019, hosted by actress La Terremoto de Alcorcón and professional chef Christian Escribà, along with guest judges. A German version of the show debuted on Netflix in January 2020, hosted by actress and model Angelina Kirsch.

== Other media ==
On October 4, 2022, Netflix's game services launched a mobile game based on the series titled Nailed It! Baking Bash.
