= Examination of Conscience (miniseries) =

Spanish docuseries on Netflix

- Genre: Docuseries
- Created by: Enric Hernández; Luis Mauri; Albert Solé
- Directed by: Albert Sol
- Country of origin: Spain
- Original language: Spanish
- No. of seasons: 1
- No. of episodes: 3

Production
- Running time: 50–53 minutes
- Production companies: Zeta Cinema; Zeta Audiovisual; Minimal Films

Original release
- Network: Netflix
- Release: 25 January 2019

Examination of Conscience (Spanish: Examen de Conciencia) is a Spanish documentary television miniseries created by Enric Hernández, Luis Mauri, and Albert Solé, and directed by Albert Sol premiered on Netflix on January 25, 2019. The three 50-minute episodes examines the extent of child abuse accusations across three Spanish Marist Brother schools in Spain by priests or other people associated with the Catholic Church. Through interviews with victims, clergy members, journalists, and experts, it discusses different cases, the lack of support for the victims by the church, and how laws in Spain do not support prosecuting cases when they are reported decades after the occurrence.

The documentary series was produced by Zeta Cinema, Zeta Audiovisual and Minimal Films.

== Release ==
Examination of Conscience was released on Netflix streaming on January 25, 2019.
