= Fleur de Lys (restaurant) =

Coordinates: 37.78856°N 122.41310°W

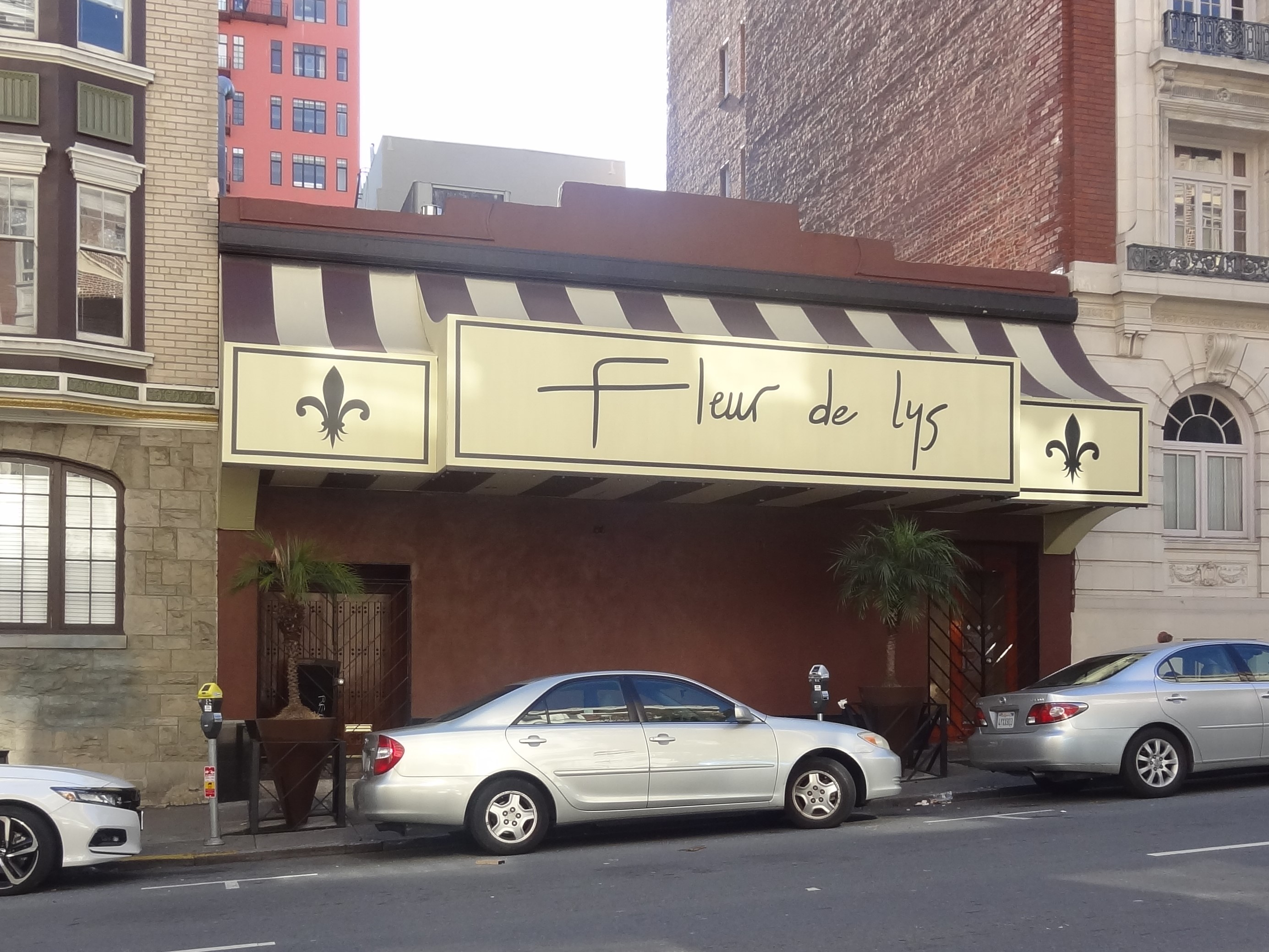
- Interactive map of Fleur de Lys

Restaurant information
- Established: 1957
- Closed: June 2014
- Previous owner: Maurice Rouas
- Chef: Hubert Keller
- Food type: French
- Location: 777 Sutter St., San Francisco, California, 94109, United States
- Seating capacity: 75
- Other locations: Las Vegas, Nevada

Fleur de Lys (French: [flœʁ d(ə) lis]) was a French restaurant in San Francisco, California, US. It closed in June 2014 after a 28-year run.

A sister restaurant in Las Vegas by the same name was closed in 2010 and reopened under the name Fleur by Hubert Keller in 2010.

== History and description ==
The original 75-seat restaurant occupied an unobtrusive windowless mid-block storefront on Sutter Street near Jones Street in the Tendernob neighborhood of San Francisco. The restaurant first opened in the late 1950s. Maurice Rouas, then Maître d', purchased the restaurant from its original owner in 1970 and remained active as of 2012. In 1986 he brought Hubert Keller as chef from the now-defunct Sutter 500 restaurant nearby. The restaurant was damaged by a kitchen fire in 2001 and closed for more than a year due to difficulty obtaining rebuilding permits. Keller spent the time opening a second restaurant named Fleur in the Mandalay Bay in Las Vegas and opening a hamburger restaurant, "Burger Bar," in the same building. The renovation, designed by Keller's wife, Chantal, eventually cost more than US$4 million.

The original Fleur de Lys was ranked as one of the top 40 restaurants in the United States in 2004, 2005, and 2006 by Gayot restaurant guide. As of 2008 the Las Vegas restaurant had a Gayot rating of 16, and the original 15. It is one of seven restaurants in the San Francisco Bay Area to receive the San Francisco Chronicle's highest four-star rating, which it has maintained for many years. Fleur de Lys has also been ranked as one of the top 25 restaurants in the United States by Food & Wine magazine. The fixed-price cuisine is classic French, with innovative dishes using French techniques based on Keller's Alsatian sensibilities. To suit local tastes, the restaurant cooks with reduced fat, offers vegetarian and no-fat dinners, and features seasonal California ingredients.

== See also ==
- List of Michelin-starred restaurants in California
- List of restaurants in the Las Vegas Valley

== Bibliography ==
- Bauer, Michael (20 October 2002). "Bloom not off Fleur de Lys: Fire that closed Keller's spot may have been the spark for an exciting rebirth". San Francisco Chronicle.
- Bauer, Michael (4 September 2005). "The Magnificent Seven: Revisiting four-star restaurants reveals they're better than ever". The San Francisco Chronicle.
