= Gail Simmons =

Canadian food writer and cookbook author (born 1976)

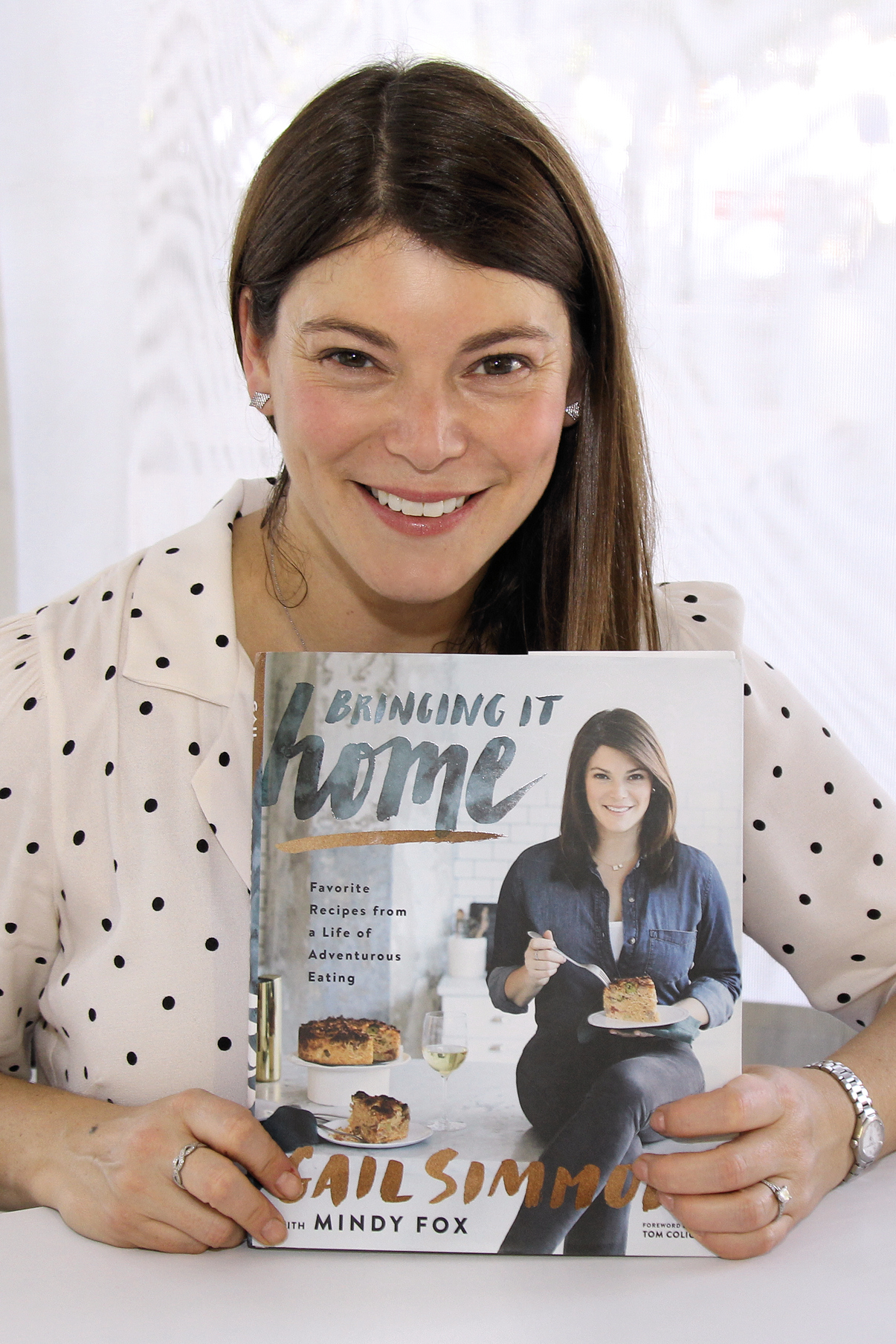
- Simmons in 2017
- Born: May 19, 1976 (age 50); Toronto, Ontario, Canada
- Education: McGill University
- Occupations: Culinary expert, food writer, television personality
- Spouse: Jeremy Abrams (2008-present)

Gail Simmons (born May 19, 1976) is a Canadian food writer and cookbook author. She has served as a permanent judge on Bravo's Emmy-winning series Top Chef since the show's inception in 2006. Simmons was previously the head critic on Top Chef Duels and host of Top Chef: Just Desserts, Bravo's pastry-focused spin-off of the Top Chef franchise. She was also the co-host of The Feed, which aired in 2014 on FYI, A+E's new lifestyle network. In addition to her work on Top Chef, Gail makes frequent television appearances on NBC's Today and ABC's Good Morning America, among others. She has been featured in such publications as New York magazine, Travel + Leisure, GQ, People, Los Angeles Times, and more.

== Early life ==
Simmons was born in Toronto, Ontario, Canada, to a Jewish family of Eastern European origin, and graduated from McGill University in Montreal, where she majored in anthropology and Spanish. She is the daughter of Renee and Ivor Simmons and the youngest of three siblings. Her mother, Renee, was formerly a food columnist for Globe and Mail and conducted cooking classes in their home.

== Career ==
=== Early career ===
She began her food journalism career writing restaurant reviews for the McGill Tribune before becoming an intern at the monthly magazine Toronto Life and later wrote for the daily National Post newspaper.

Simmons attended the Peter Kump New York Cooking School in New York City and apprenticed at Le Cirque and Vong.

Simmons worked for food critic Jeffrey Steingarten as his assistant for two years at Vogue before becoming the special events manager for chef Daniel Boulud's restaurant empire for three years.

In 2004, she joined Food & Wine as special projects manager.

=== Top Chef franchise ===
Simmons has been a judge with Top Chef since its March 8, 2006 season one premiere; she also hosted the spinoff show, Top Chef: Just Desserts, which premiered on September 15, 2010, after the seventh-season finale of Top Chef.

=== Publications ===
Simmons' first book, her memoir Talking With My Mouth Full: My Life as a Professional Eater, was published by Hyperion in February 2012.

=== Video series ===
She teaches viewers new ways to cook with familiar and unusual staples in their kitchens in the KitchenDaily.com online video series titled The Pantry Project.

=== Other media ===
Her Bravo.com bio reports: "Gail makes frequent television appearances on The Today Show, Good Morning America, Fox & Friends, among others."

=== Appearances ===
She has made appearances at prominent culinary festivals; examples in the U.S. include the South Beach Wine & Food Festival, New York City Wine & Food Festival, Pebble Beach Food & Wine, Kohler Food & Wine Experience, and the Cayman Cookout.

=== Community service and board memberships ===
Gail actively supports Common Threads, an organization that teaches low-income children to cook wholesome, affordable meals. She was a founding member of Food & Wine’s Grow for Good Campaign to raise funds and awareness for sustainable agriculture programs in the United States. She sits on the boards of the American Institute of Wine & Food, Hot Bread Kitchen, the Institute of Culinary Education’s Alumni Committee, the Women at NBCU Advisory Board, and the food rescue organization City Harvest.

== Recognition ==
She was selected for the 2010 Forward 50 by The Jewish Daily Forward.

She has been featured in such media outlets as New York Magazine, Travel + Leisure, GQ, People, TV Guide, Entertainment Weekly, and Los Angeles Times, and was named the #1 Reality TV Judge in America by The New York Post.

== Personal life ==
Simmons married Jeremy Abrams in 2008. Their wedding featured a farmers' market theme and appeared in Martha Stewart's Real Weddings magazine. Simmons wore a Carolina Herrera wedding gown and her mother's veil from 42 years earlier. She said in 2012 she "put a big chunk of savings into his business," Audiostiles which creates background music programming for the hospitality industry. She gave birth to their daughter Dahlia Rae on 29 December 2013. Simmons gave birth to their second child, a son named Kole Jack, on May 23, 2018. On May 19, 2022, Simmons became an American citizen on her 46th birthday.

== Filmography ==
Television
Year	Title	Role	Notes
2006–present	Top Chef	Herself	
2007	At the Table with...	Herself	Episodes: "Rob Feenie" and "Daniel Boulud"
2009-2013	Top Chef Masters	Herself	Judge
2010	Avec Eric	Herself	Episodes: "Catch and Cook" and "Cayman Cookout"
2010-2011	Top Chef: Just Desserts	Herself	Host
2011	Through the Grapevine	Herself	Episode: "Checking Out Chiantis from Tuscany"
2011	Top Chef Canada	Herself	Guest judge Season 1 episode 12: "Chef McEwan's Favourite Things"
2011-2018	The Best Thing I Ever Ate	Herself	9 episodes
2012	My Last Supper	Herself	
2013	Royal Pains	Herself	Season 5 episode 6: "Can of Worms"
2014	Recipe to Riches	Herself	Judge; Season 3 episode 5: "Savory Snacks"
2014	Top Chef Duels	Herself	Judge
2015-2016	Guilty Pleasures	Herself	Season 2 episodes 5 and 10: "Holy Moly Burgers" and "Coast to Coast Indulgences"
2017	Beat Bobby Flay	Herself	Judge; Season 12 episode 6: "Open Grill Season"
2017	Cooks vs. Cons	Herself	Judge; Season 4 episode 12 and season 5 episode 5: "Taco Tug-O-War" and "The Whole Enchilada"
2017-2018	Top Chef Junior	Herself	Judge
2018–present	Iron Chef Canada	Herself	Host
2021–present	Top Chef Amateurs	Herself	Host
2021–present	The Good Dish	Herself	Co-host
2022	Top Chef Canada	Herself	Guest judge Season 10 episode 3: "Restaurant Wars"

== Published works ==
- Simmons, Gail (2011). Talking with My Mouth Full: My Life as a Professional Eater. Hyperion. ISBN 978-1401324506.
- Simmons, Gail (2017). Bringing It Home: Favorite Recipes from a Life of Adventurous Eating. Grand Central Life & Style. ISBN 978-1455542208.
