= François Payard =

French former pastry chef

François Payard (born July 16, 1966) is a French pastry chef at some of the world's finest restaurants, including Le Bernardin and Daniel in New York City. He was the owner of Payard Patisserie & Bistro, FP Patisserie, and FP bakery in New York City; he resigned as chief executive in 2016, and they closed after about a decade of existence in January 2018.

== Biography ==
Born in Nice, Payard grew up spending much of his time in his grandfather's pastry shop, Au Nid des Friandises, on the Riviera.

After moving to New York City in 1990 from traveling around Paris honing his skills in three-star Michelin rated pastry kitchens, chef François Payard began his New York City career at Le Bernardin and Restaurant Daniel where he earned recognition in the kitchen as the 1995 recipient of the James Beard Association "Pastry Chef of the Year" award, honoring him for his unique pastry designs and high attention to flavor.

In 1997, Payard opened his first Pâtisserie and Bistro with Payard Pâtisserie and Bistro on Manhattan’s Upper East Side. Currently, Payard has locations in Korea, Brazil, Japan, and Caesar’s Palace in Las Vegas.

Payard wrote several cookbooks, "Bite Size: Elegant Recipes for Entertaining," "Simply Sensational Desserts" and his most recent "Chocolate Epiphany: Exceptional Cookies, Cakes, and Confections for Everyone."

Payard's creations include Soy Chocolate Mousse and upgrades to the classic Payard Holiday Yule logs.

== Sources ==
- Rosenberg, Sarah; Christina Carol (June 2, 2008). "Why Francois Payard Will 'Never Complain'. One of the Best Pastry Chefs in the World Shares His Recipes". ABC News: Nightline.
- Rinella, Heidi Knapp (September 24, 2008). "Start the day right. Go beyond the bland for the first meal of the day". Las Vegas Review-Journal.
- Shimabukuro, Betty (October 8, 2008). "Party on the pier. The fish auction site is transformed to host Roy Yamaguchi's 20th-anniversary dinner". Honolulu Star-Bulletin.
