= Sylvia Weinstock =

American baker (1930–2021)

- Born: Sylvia Silver; January 28, 1930; Bronx, New York, U.S.
- Died: November 22, 2021 (aged 91); Tribeca, New York, U.S.
- Education: Hunter College (1951); Queens College (1973)
- Occupation(s): Baker, cake decorator
- Years active: 1949–2021
- Spouse: Benjamin Weinstock (m. 1949; died 2018)
- Children: 3

Sylvia Weinstock (January 28, 1930 – November 22, 2021) was an American baker and cake decorator. She was known for creating elaborate, multi-tiered wedding cakes decorated with botanically accurate sugar flowers. She also designed intricate trompe-l'oeil cakes resembling objects such as cars, crates of wine, and Fabergé eggs.

== Early life and education ==
Sylvia Silver was born January 28, 1930, in the Bronx, New York. She was raised in Williamsburg, Brooklyn. Her family lived above their shop, which sold liquor and later became a bakery.

Weinstock earned a bachelor's degree in psychology in 1951 from Hunter College. She later obtained a master's degree in education from Queens College in 1973.

== Career ==
Weinstock began her professional career as an elementary school teacher on Long Island. She began baking cakes for local restaurants and apprenticed with pastry chef George Keller at the suggestion of André Soltner of Lutèce. She founded her cake business at age 50, following her recovery from breast cancer. William Greenberg, a fellow bakery owner, began referring clients to her for wedding cakes. After moving to Manhattan from Long Island, she began baking for private events at venues such as the Carlyle Hotel. In 1983, she and her husband renovated a warehouse in Tribeca into a four-story home and headquarters for Sylvia Weinstock Cakes.

Weinstock created cakes for many celebrities, including Oprah Winfrey, Kim Kardashian, and Martha Stewart. She preferred not to use fondant, describing it as "cheap and easy." Instead, she favored buttercream, sugar flowers, and stenciled designs. Bon Appétit magazine dubbed her "the Leonardo da Vinci of wedding cakes."

After retiring from commercial baking, Weinstock appeared as a guest judge on the Food Network series Chopped Sweets and Top Chef: Just Desserts. She also appeared in season 1 of the Netflix series Nailed It!, where she was described as the show's "secret weapon." She also taught cake decorating at the Institute of Culinary Education.

== Personal life ==
In 1949, at age 19, she married Benjamin Weinstock (1925–2018). They settled in Massapequa, New York, and raised three children.

== Death ==
Weinstock died on November 22, 2021, in Tribeca at the age of 91. The cause of death was multiple myeloma.

== Publications ==
- Weinstock, Sylvia; Manchester, Kate (1999). Sweet Celebrations: The Art of Decorating Beautiful Cakes. New York, NY: Simon & Schuster. ISBN 9780684846750.
- Weinstock, Sylvia (2008). Sylvia Weinstock's Sensational Cakes. New York, NY: Stewart, Tabori & Chang. ISBN 9781584797180.
