= La Terremoto de Alcorcón =

Spanish singer, actress (born 1977)

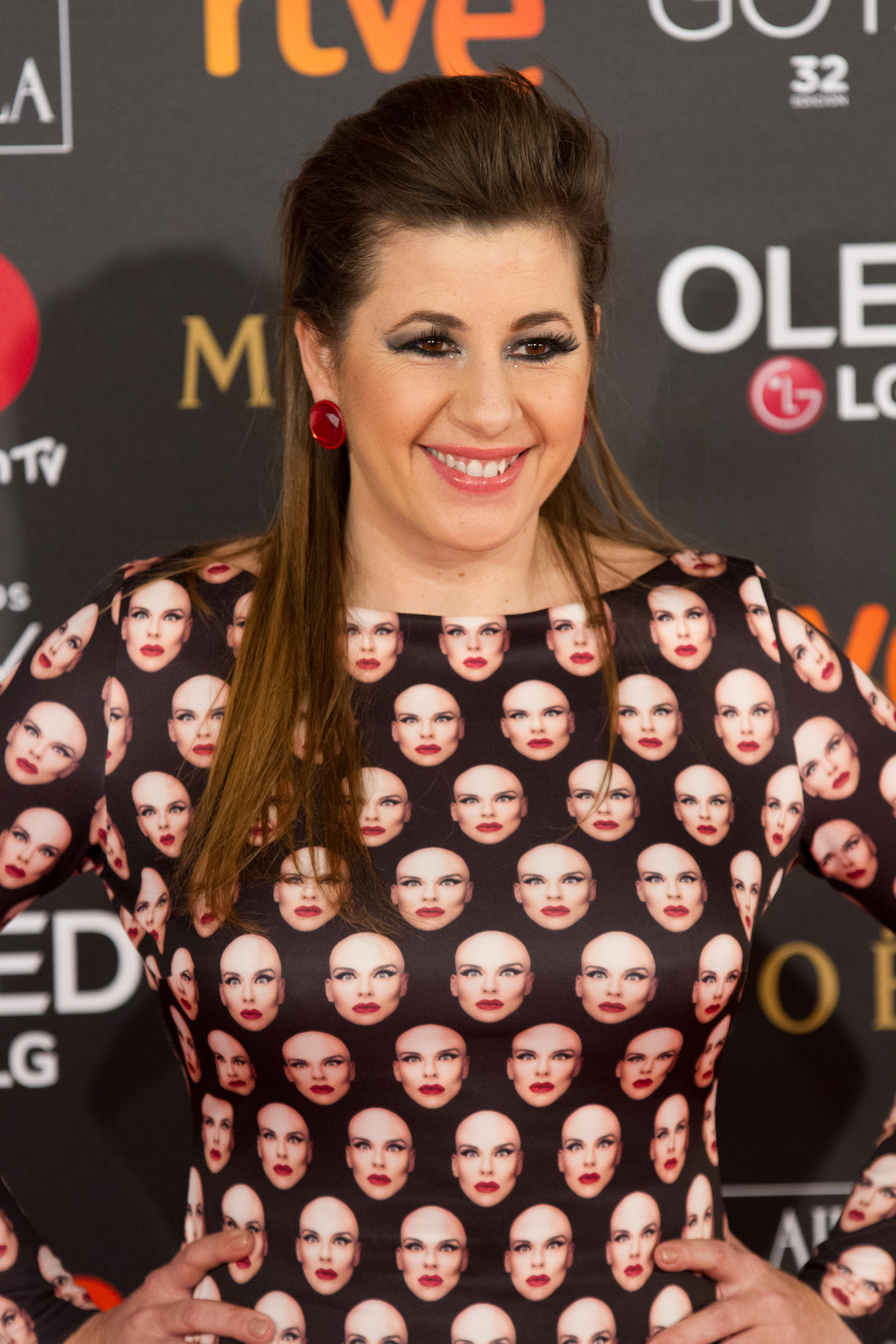
- La Terremoto at the 32nd Goya Awards in 2018
- Born: María José Charro Galán; 17 September 1977 (age 48); Madrid, Spain
- Other name: Pepa Charro
- Occupation: Singer

María José Charro Galán (born 17 September 1977), better known under her stage name La Terremoto de Alcorcón or La Terremoto (transl. The Earthquake of Alcorcón), and also as Pepa Charro, is a Spanish singer born in Madrid, Spain.

She grew up in Alcorcón and studied languages. She went to the United Kingdom to work as an au pair. She has been a member of the group Diabéticas Aceleradas since 1999. She lives in Mallorca, where she owns a bar. She became well known in Spain for parodies of Madonna's "Hung Up" and "Can't Get You Out of My Head" and "2 Hearts", both by Kylie Minogue.

Recently she appeared as a regular feature of TVE2's late-night programme, presented by Cayetana Guillén Cuervo.

She has become a gay icon in Spain and has performed in New York City, London (at The Royal Vauxhall Tavern), and Mexico D.F. clubs. In 2007, she wrote and performed the track "Libérate", becoming the Official Europride Anthem (2007, Madrid). She performed in Lisbon during its "Arraial Gay Pride" in June 2009.

In 2019 she signed with Netflix to host the Spanish version of its reality series Nailed It!, which is titled Niquelao!. The first season of Niquelao! was released on October 25, 2019.

In 2023, she was a guest celebrity judge in the episode "Snatch Game - España Season 3" of the Spanish language reality television series Drag Race España streamed on ATRESplayer Premium.

== Discography ==
Unless otherwise indicated, all these singles are parodies of the original artists:

- "I Will Survive" by Gloria Gaynor (titled "Sin Afeitar")
- "¿A quién le importa?" by Alaska y Dinarama
- "It's Raining Men" by Geri Halliwell
- "Thriller" by Michael Jackson
- "Hung Up" by Madonna
- "Enajená" ("Let Me Out" by Dover)
- "Crazy in Love" by Beyoncé
- "Can't Get You Out of My Head" by Kylie Minogue
- "Libérate" - original song written and performed by Terremoto de Alcorcón for the Official Europride Anthemn, Madrid 2007
- "2 Hearts" by Kylie Minogue
- "He's My Man" (Eurovision Song Contest 2008 - not chosen to be the Spanish entry)
