= Hubert Keller =

French chef

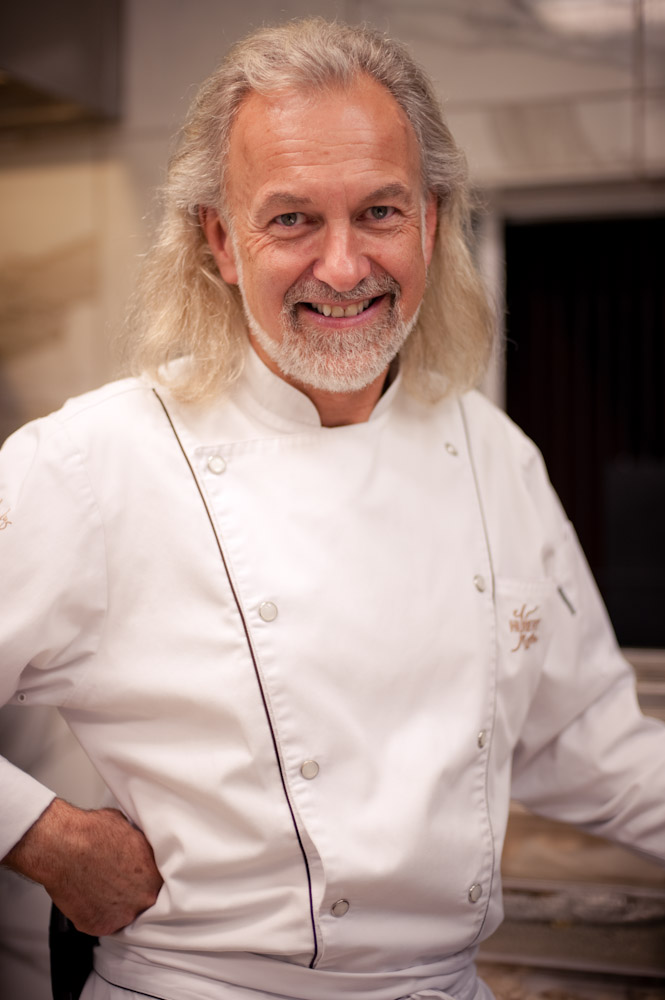
- Keller in 2009
- Born: 1954 (age 71–72); Alsace, France
- Culinary career
- Cooking style: French
- Television show
- Secrets of a Chef

Hubert Keller (born 1954) is a noted French chef, who is known for his signature restaurants, Fleur de Lys in San Francisco and Las Vegas.

== Biography ==
Keller was born in Alsace, France, and graduated from the École Hoteliere in Strasbourg. Beginning as a pastry chef, he worked in various restaurants, including Auberge de L'Ill, the cruise liner Mermoz, Domaine de Chateauneuf, and Moulin de Mougins in France, and La Cuisine du Soleil in São Paulo, Brazil. He trained under Paul Haeberlin, Paul Bocuse, and Roger Vergé before coming to San Francisco in 1982 to revitalize the now-defunct Sutter 500.

In 1986, he became co-owner and executive chef of the original Fleur de Lys in San Francisco. He later opened a gourmet Burger Bar in Las Vegas, Nevada, which features a $60 "Rossini Burger" made of American Kobe beef, sautéed foie gras, and shaved truffles. Shortly after, he opened a second Fleur de Lys at Mandalay Bay. Chef Keller also opened a French-influenced steakhouse in Downtown St. Louis called SLEEK, which is regarded as the best steak house in St. Louis. He was the consulting chef at the Club XIX, at the Lodge in Pebble Beach in Pebble Beach, California. He is the author of The Cuisine of Hubert Keller and is the co-author of Dr. Dean Ornish's Eat More, Weigh Less. Keller was the first guest chef with Jean-Marc Fullsack to cook a dinner for a president (Clinton) in White House history and to train the White House chef in healthy cooking with the guidance of Jean-Marc Fullsack.

== Awards ==
In 1988, Hubert Keller was ranked as one of the "10 best new chefs in America" by Food & Wine magazine. In 1997, he won the James Beard Foundation/Perrier-Jouët award for America's Best Chef in California. Keller also received the James Beard Foundation's Who's Who of Food and Beverage in America lifetime achievement designation in 2003. Fleur de Lys has been ranked as one of the top 40 restaurants in the United States in 2004, 2005, and 2006 by Gayot restaurant guide, and was awarded one Michelin star in 2006. Fleur de Lys has also been ranked as one of the top 25 restaurants in the United States by Food & Wine magazine.

== Appearances ==
Keller starred in Secrets of a Chef, a cooking show on American public television network PBS. He placed third (behind winner Rick Bayless and runner-up Michael Chiarello) in Top Chef Masters, Bravo's 2009 cooking reality competition, and designated that any winnings would be donated to Make-A-Wish Foundation. He won the first competition round, using a dorm room shower to cool pasta. Previously, he appeared three times as a guest judge on the Top Chef in the series premiere and the finales of Season 1, Season 2, and Season 5. In Season 13, he judged a contest held in his then closed restaurant Fleur de Lys in San Francisco. In 2008 he was invited to the First Annual Food and Wine Exhibition in Monterey, California, and returned in the 2nd Annual Exhibition in 2009

== Books and publications ==
- Hubert Keller, John Harrisson (August 1996). The Cuisine of Herbert Keller. Ten Speed Press. ISBN 0-89815-807-9.
- Hubert Keller, Penelope Wisner (April 2009). Burger Bar: Build Your Own Ultimate Burgers. Wiley. ISBN 978-0-470-18767-8.
- Hubert Keller, Penelope Wisner (October 2012) Hubert Keller: Souvenirs. ISBN 9781449411428

== Personal ==
Keller is also an avid DJ, frequently performing at food-related events. His friend, San-Francisco-based DJ "Frenchy le Freak," taught him the skills in exchange for cooking instruction.
