= Top Chef: Destination Canada =

Season 22 of American television series

- Season 22
- Hosted by: Kristen Kish
- Judges: Tom Colicchio; Gail Simmons
- No. of contestants: 17
- Winner: Tristen Epps-Long
- Runners-up: Shuai Wang; Bailey Sullivan
- Location: Toronto, Ontario; Calgary and Canmore, Alberta
- Finals venue: Milan, Italy

Release
- Original network: Bravo
- Original release: March 13 – June 12, 2025

Season chronology
- ← Previous; Wisconsin Next → Carolinas

Top Chef: Destination Canada is the twenty-second season of the American reality television series Top Chef. The competition was filmed primarily in Toronto, Ontario, with additional episodes set in Calgary and Canmore, Alberta. The finale was filmed in Milan, Italy. The season was produced in collaboration with the Destination Canada tourism board and co-produced with Insight Productions, the team behind Top Chef Canada.

Destination Canada boasted the largest grand prize package in the series' history. In addition to the usual prizes of US$250,000, a feature in Food & Wine magazine, and an appearance at the Food & Wine Classic in Aspen, the winner received $125,000 in Delta Air Lines flight credits and Diamond Medallion SkyMiles status, their own headlining dinner at the James Beard House in New York City, and the opportunity to present at the James Beard Restaurant and Chef Awards in Chicago. The contestants also had the chance to earn cash prizes, totaling more than $150,000, during every Quickfire Challenge and certain Elimination Challenges.

The season premiered on March 13, 2025, and concluded on June 12, 2025. In the season finale, Tristen Epps-Long was declared the winner over runners-up Shuai Wang and Bailey Sullivan. For the first time since Top Chef: Boston, no Fan Favorite vote was held.

== Contestants ==
Fifteen chefs competed in Top Chef: Destination Canada. Two additional contestants, Sam Olayinka and Ying Gao, started in the Last Chance Kitchen to compete for a potential spot in the main competition.

Name	Hometown	Current Residence (Note: The contestants' city, state, or country of residence during time of filming.)
Anya El-Wattar	Moscow, Russia	San Francisco, California
Paula Endara	Quito, Ecuador	Lexington, Kentucky
Tristen Epps-Long	Virginia Beach, Virginia	Houston, Texas
Ying Gao	Beijing, China	Whistler, British Columbia
Corwin Hemming	Augusta, Georgia	Brooklyn, New York
Katianna Hong	Clifton Park, New York	Los Angeles, California
Lana Lagomarsini	The Bronx, New York	Harlem, New York
Vincenzo "Vinny" Loseto	Massapequa, New York	Napa, California
Henry Lu	The Bronx, New York	Houston, Texas
Zubair Mohajir	Chennai, India	Chicago, Illinois
César Murillo	Dallas, Texas	Chicago, Illinois
Sam Olayinka	Ottawa, Ontario	Vancouver, British Columbia
Massimo Piedimonte	Montreal, Quebec	
Bailey Sullivan	Chicago, Illinois	
Kat Turner	Sturgeon Bay, Wisconsin	Los Angeles, California
Shuai Wang	Queens, New York	North Charleston, South Carolina
Mimi Weissenborn	Frederick, Maryland	Portland, Maine

== Contestant progress ==
Episode #		1	2	3	4	5	6	7	8	9	10	11	12	13	14
Quickfire Challenge Results		César ★ Katianna ★ Mimi ★ Lana ↑ Massimo ↑ Paula ↑ Shuai ↑ Tristen ↑ Vinny ↑	Shuai ★ Kat ↑ Massimo ↑ Bailey ↓ Henry ↓ Paula ↓	Katianna ★ Shuai ↑ Zubair ↑ César ↓ Kat ↓ Massimo ↓	Corwin ★ Kat ↑ Shuai ↑ Henry ↓ Massimo ↓ Tristen ↓	N/A	Tristen ★ César ↑ Massimo ↑ Paula ↑ Henry ↓ Shuai ↓ Vinny ↓	Henry ★ Massimo ↑ Tristen ↑ Bailey ↓ César ↓ Paula ↓	N/A	Lana ★ Shuai ↑ Tristen ↑ Vinny ↑ Bailey ↓ César ↓ Massimo ↓	César ★ Massimo ↑ Shuai ↑ Bailey ↓ Lana ↓ Tristen ↓ Vinny ↓	Shuai ★ Bailey ↑ Tristen ↑ César ↓ Lana ↓ Massimo ↓	N/A	Tristen ★	N/A
Contestant		Elimination Challenge Results													
1	Tristen	IN	HIGH	HIGH	WIN^{1}	WIN^{1}	HIGH ^{3}	WIN^{1}	WIN	HIGH	LOW	HIGH	HIGH	IN	WINNER
2	Shuai	HIGH	HIGH	IN	LOW	IN	LOW	HIGH	LOW	IN	WIN	HIGH	WIN	WIN	RUNNER-UP
2	Bailey	IN	OUT			WIN^{2}	IN	IN	IN	HIGH	HIGH	LOW	LOW	IN	RUNNER-UP
4	César	HIGH	HIGH	IN	IN	HIGH	HIGH ^{3}	LOW	IN	OUT	IN^{4}	LOW	HIGH	OUT	
5	Massimo	IN	IN	LOW	IN	IN	WIN^{1}	IN	HIGH	WIN	HIGH	WIN	OUT		
6	Lana	IN	HIGH	IN	IN	LOW	HIGH	IN	HIGH	LOW	LOW	OUT			
7	Vinny	WIN^{1}	IN	IN	IN	LOW	IN	HIGH	HIGH	LOW	OUT				
8	Paula	IN	HIGH	LOW	IN	IN	HIGH	LOW	OUT						
9	Henry	HIGH	LOW	IN	LOW	IN	LOW	OUT							
10	Katianna	IN	IN	WIN^{1}	IN	HIGH	OUT								
11	Corwin	IN	IN	HIGH	HIGH	OUT									
11	Kat	LOW	IN	IN	HIGH	OUT									
13	Zubair	IN	WIN^{1}	IN	OUT										
14	Anya	HIGH	IN	OUT											
15	Mimi	OUT													

^Note 1: The chef(s) won immunity for the next Elimination Challenge.
^Note 2: Bailey won the first Last Chance Kitchen re-entry challenge and returned to the competition. She was also given immunity for her first Elimination Challenge back.
^Note 3: Although both ended up on the losing team and were thus ineligible to win, the judges specifically cited César and Tristen as having the best dishes of the challenge.
^Note 4: César won the second Last Chance Kitchen re-entry challenge and returned to the competition.

Quickfire Challenge
★ The chef won the Quickfire Challenge.
↑ The chef was selected as one of the top entries in the Quickfire Challenge but did not win.
↓ The chef was selected as one of the bottom entries in the Quickfire Challenge.
Elimination Challenge
(WINNER) The chef won the season and was crowned "Top Chef".
(RUNNER-UP) The chef was a runner-up for the season.
(WIN) The chef won the Elimination Challenge.
(HIGH) The chef was selected as one of the top entries in the Elimination Challenge but did not win.
(IN) The chef was not selected as one of the top or bottom entries in the Elimination Challenge and was safe.
(LOW) The chef was selected as one of the bottom entries in the Elimination Challenge but was not eliminated.
(OUT) The chef lost the Elimination Challenge.

== Episodes ==
No. overall	No. in season	Title	Original release date	US viewers (millions)
317	1	"Across Canada, We Go!"	March 13, 2025	0.47
Quickfire Challenge: The chefs first had 30 seconds to grab one ingredient from the Top Chef pantry. They were then split into groups of three. In honor of Toronto's nickname "The Six", referring to the number of former municipalities that formed the current city of Toronto, each team had 30 minutes to create a dish featuring six ingredients — the three ingredients chosen by the group members, and three ingredients selected by host Kristen Kish, head judge Tom Colicchio, and judge Gail Simmons. Kristen picked tomatoes, Gail picked chives, and Tom picked clams. The winning team received $15,000.: Red Team: Lana, Paula, Vinny; Blue Team: Anya, Bailey, Zubair; Yellow Team: César, Katianna , Mimi; Green Team: Massimo, Shuai, Tristen; Purple Team: Corwin, Henry, Kat; Winners: César, Katianna, and Mimi (Apple & Fennel Soup with Clams, Corn & Chorizo Relish); Elimination Challenge: The chefs, remaining in the same groups from the Quickfire Challenge but now competing against their former teammates, were assigned sets of ingredients inspired by the five-region model of Canada: the West Coast, Canadian Prairies, Central Canada, Atlantic Canada, and Northern Canada. The chefs' dishes were required to include at least three of the six ingredients from their assigned region. One person from each group was eligible to win the challenge, while those with the judges' least favorite dishes were at risk for elimination. The dishes were served at restaurant Casa Madera. The winner received immunity for the next Elimination Challenge. The diners included Top Chef Canada winners and Top Chef: World All-Stars alums Nicole Gomes and Dale MacKay, guest judge and Top Chef Canada regular David Zilber, chef/restaurateur Jeremy Charles, and chef Sheila Flaherty.: Winner: Vinny (West Region - Confit Salmon with Miso-Hazelnut Butter Mushrooms & Consommé); Eliminated: Mimi (Central Region - Grilled Pork Loin & Potato Purée with Corn Beurre Monté & Peach Relish)
318	2	"Brunch à la Boulud"	March 20, 2025	0.44
Quickfire Challenge: The chefs were given 30 minutes to put their own spin on poutine. They were allowed to take their dish in any direction, as long as it included a starchy vegetable base, a cheese, and a sauce. The winner received $5,000. Gail joined Kristen to help judge the challenge. The guest judge was actress Sarah Levy.: Winner: Shuai (Soy Sauce Fondant Potato & Three Cheese Sauce); Elimination Challenge: The chefs were divided into two teams and tasked with preparing seven-course brunch menus at Café Boulud. In homage to Canadian sugar shacks, all dishes were required to include a maple component. In addition to their regular budget, each team was provided $50 to shop at St. Lawrence Market for mandatory ingredients for the opposing team, giving them the opportunity to sabotage each other. The Brown Team bought lasagna and white truffle oil; the Green Team bought pizza, gummy and cinnamon candies, and candy corn. While the judges declared an individual winner, who received immunity for the next Elimination Challenge, the entire winning team received $35,000. The guest judges were Sarah Levy and chef Daniel Boulud.: Green Team: Anya, Bailey, Henry, Kat, Katianna, Massimo, Vinny; Brown Team: César, Corwin, Lana, Paula, Shuai, Tristen, Zubair; Winning Team: Brown Team; Winner: Zubair (Tandoori Maple Fried Chicken, Scallion Corn Cake, Spicy Maple Butter, Sweet Maple Yogurt); Eliminated: Bailey (Maple Tart with Whipped Yogurt, Pine Nuts & Maple Brown Butter Pineapple)
319	3	"Best Served Cold"	March 27, 2025	0.33
Quickfire Challenge: The chefs created their own version of a Jamaican patty. They first had 15 minutes to make their dough from scratch. After allowing their dough to rest, they were given 30 minutes to finish their patties. The winner received $10,000. The guest judge was private chef and recipe developer Dwight Smith.: Winner: Katianna (Toasted Nori & Sesame Patty with Sweet Potato, Roasted Kimchi & Bacon); Elimination Challenge: In a tribute to ice hockey, the chefs were asked to create dishes best served cold. Prior to the cook, the contestants chose one of seven cloches, each concealing an ingredient related to an ice hockey term or slang word that they were required to incorporate into their dish: biscuit, apple, muffin, egg, grapefruit, licorice knob, or peanut butter. The dishes were served in the Top Chef kitchen to the judges, Food & Wine editor-in-chief and guest judge Hunter Lewis, Top Chef Masters alum Lynn Crawford, and professional ice hockey players Natalie Spooner and Sarah Nurse. The winner received immunity for the next Elimination Challenge.: Winner: Katianna (Licorice Knob - Chilled Chicken & Licorice Soba with Cucumber & Daikon); Eliminated: Anya (Egg - Pine Needle Ice Cream with Sea Buckthorn Cake)
320	4	"Top Chef Trivia"	April 3, 2025	0.45
Quickfire Challenge: In three teams of four, the chefs competed in a trivia game hosted by actor and guest judge Michael Cera, and Jeopardy! champions Mattea Roach and Amy Schneider. The answer to each trivia question was associated with an ingredient. After 15 questions, the team with the most correct answers received 30 minutes of cooking time, while the second and third-place teams received 20 and 15 minutes, respectively. The contestants then competed individually to cook dishes utilizing at least three of the ingredients they received. The winner received $10,000.: Green Team (30 minutes): César, Corwin, Shuai, Vinny; Purple Team (20 minutes): Lana, Massimo, Paula, Zubair; Yellow Team (15 minutes): Henry, Kat, Katianna, Tristen; Winner: Corwin (Seared Scallop with Chili Crisp & Ginger Beurre Blanc, Shrimp Paste, Yuzu & Shiso); Elimination Challenge: The chefs had to use Canadian desserts as inspiration for savory dishes. The available desserts - figgy duff, chocolate potato cake, butter tarts, date squares, Jam Jams, and Nanaimo bars - were randomly assigned via knife draw. The dishes were served at Casa Loma to the judges, guest judge Michael Cera, and pastry chefs Stephanie Duong and Lenore Johnson. The winner received immunity for the next Elimination Challenge.: Winner: Tristen (Figgy Duff - Pepperpot with Braised Lamb, Lamb Fat Madeleine & Pickled Grapes); Eliminated: Zubair (Butter Tart - Seared Duck Breast with Sheermal, Pecan & Cashew Korma)
321	5	"Line Cook for a Day"	April 10, 2025	0.48
Elimination Challenge: Following Episode 4 of Last Chance Kitchen, Bailey rejoined the competition. After pairing up, the chefs staged at various restaurants around Toronto, working the line and learning about multicultural cuisines. These included the Indian restaurant Dil Se, Portuguese restaurant Mercado, Caribbean restaurant Miss Likklemore's, Filipino restaurant BB's, Greek restaurant Soulas, and Thai restaurant Kiin. The teams were then responsible for creating dishes inspired by their time in their respective kitchens. The dishes were served at The Bentway for the judges, Top Chef: Kentucky/World All-Stars runner-up and guest judge Sara Bradley, and 150 guest diners. The winners received immunity for the next Elimination Challenge. Both members of the losing team were eliminated.: Red Team (Indian Cuisine): Lana, Vinny; Orange Team (Portuguese Cuisine): Corwin, Kat; Yellow Team (Caribbean Cuisine): Massimo, Paula; Green Team (Filipino Cuisine): Henry, Shuai; Blue Team (Greek Cuisine): Bailey, Tristen; Purple Team (Royal Thai Cuisine): César, Katianna; Winners: Bailey and Tristen (Grilled Octopus with Kalamata Caramel Glaze & Charred Green Olive Honey Relish); Eliminated: Corwin and Kat (Cod & Shrimp Bomba with Saffron Aioli, Smoked Roe, Piri Piri & Pickles)
322	6	"Pickle Me This"	April 17, 2025	0.41
Quickfire Challenge: In a Chipotle Mexican Grill-sponsored challenge, the chefs were given 30 minutes to take the ingredients used to make their Chipotle lunch orders from a previous day and rework them into new dishes. The winner received $10,000. The guest judges were Top Chef Masters alum Susur Lee and his son Jet Bent-Lee.: Winner: Tristen (Steak Tartare, Obe Ata Sofrito, Green Harissa, Crema & Lime Cured Corn); Elimination Challenge: The chefs, split into two teams, produced five-course progressive menus featuring five different types of pickles: cornichons, full-sour pickles, dill pickles, spicy pickles, and bread-and-butter pickles. As the winners of the previous Elimination Challenge, Bailey and Tristen were able to pick their teammates. The dishes were served in five head-to-head match-ups at the restaurant DaNico. The first team to reach three points won the challenge, and the contestant with the judges' favorite dish from the winning team received immunity for the next Elimination Challenge. The diners included Top Chef: Wisconsin winner and guest judge Danny Garcia, Top Chef Canada Season 3 winner Matthew Stowe, chefs Daniele Corona and Nick Liu, and James Beard Foundation CEO Clare Reichenbach.: Green Team: César, Henry, Katianna, Shuai, Tristen; Purple Team: Bailey, Lana, Massimo, Paula, Vinny; Winning Team: Purple Team; Winner: Massimo (Cornichon - Fried Pickled Cannolo with L'Express Steak Tartare); Eliminated: Katianna (Dill - Roasted Dilly Cucumbers, Dill Pickle & Clam Vinaigrette, Pickle Brined Poached Potatoes & Cucumber Seed Porridge)
323	7	"You Wanna Pizza Me?"	April 24, 2025	0.38
Quickfire Challenge: In a Finish-sponsored challenge, the chefs had 30 minutes to create dishes based on a tough dirty dish stain, which included tomato sauce, meat sauce, coffee, guacamole, macaroni and cheese, oatmeal, eggs, rice, and lasagna. The winner received $10,000. The guest judge was Top Chef Canada host Eden Grinshpan.: Winner: Henry (Oatmeal - Glutinous Rice Balls with Maple Butter, Toasted Oats & Oatmeal Broth); Elimination Challenge: In a nod to Hawaiian pizza and sushi pizza, both Canadian inventions, the chefs were tasked with making unconventional pizzas. Their pizza party was held at the Niagara-on-the-Lake Ravine Vineyard Estate Winery with 70 guest diners in attendance, including Eden Grinshpan, chef John Vetere, Top Chef: Chicago/All-Stars contestant Spike Mendelsohn, and Top Chef Masters alum Wylie Dufresne. The winner received the last Elimination Challenge immunity of the season.: Winner: Tristen (Lahmajun Pizza with Lamb, Anchovy Ranch & Pickled Grapes); Eliminated: Henry (Pho Rice Pizza with Pho Marinated Brisket, Herb Pesto & Hoisin Sriracha Aioli)
324	8	"Restaurant Wars"	May 1, 2025	0.44
Elimination Challenge: The chefs competed in Restaurant Wars at The Warehouse event venue in Downsview Park. Each team was responsible for developing a three-course menu (with each course offering two different options), decorating their restaurant, training their waitstaff, and serving their dishes to the judges and 100 guest diners. While the judges declared an individual winner, the entire winning team received $40,000. The guest judges were Top Chef: New Orleans runner-up Nina Compton and Top Chef Canada judge Janet Zuccarini.: Nonna Pipón: Bailey, César, Paula (EC), Shuai (FOH); First Course: Chipotle Chorizo Arancini with Tonnato Aioli (Bailey); Frutti di Mare with Aguachile & Chicharrón (Shuai); Second Course: Ancho Braised Short Rib with Polenta, Ricotta Salata & Roasted Apples (César); Cannelloni al Forno with Toasted Pepitas & Almond Romesco (Bailey); Third Course: Torta di Noci with Tres Leches (Paula); Churros with Pistachio Crème Anglaise (César); Phlora + Phauna: Lana, Massimo (FOH), Tristen (EC), Vinny; First Course: Cured & Smoked Trout with Potlikker Consommé (Lana); Grilled Mushroom Escovitch with Canadian Bay Scallop, Ajo Blanco & Dawadawa (Tristen); Second Course: Potato, Celery Root & Truffle Pithivier with Lamb Jus (Lana); Butternut Squash Confit with Grilled Pork & XO Sauce (Vinny); Third Course: Corn Crémeux with Corn Ice Cream, Grilled Blueberry Condiment & Blueberry Crisp (Massimo); Milk Chocolate Custard with "Dirt" Chocolate & Caramelized Parsnip (Tristen); Winning Team: Phlora + Phauna; Winner: Tristen; Eliminated: Paula
325	9	"Cooking on the Edge"	May 8, 2025	0.39
Quickfire Challenge: The chefs had 20 minutes to prepare dishes featuring Prince Edward Island mussels. The guest judge was chef instructor Ilona Daniel. The winner received $10,000. Like the previous season, Tom Colicchio and Gail Simmons joined Kristen Kish to judge the remaining Quickfire Challenges. From this point forward, the contestants' performances in both the Quickfire and Elimination Challenge were factored into decisions at Judges' Table.: Winner: Lana (Mussel Italian Toast with Garlic Mussel Juice Aioli, Coppa, Mustard, Olives & Capers); Elimination Challenge: The chefs participated in the CN Tower EdgeWalk, which offered two distinct advantages. If the contestants completed the full 360° walk around the tower, they earned an extra $75 toward a specialty shop during their grocery shopping period. If they managed to lean both forward and backward off the edge of the viewing platform, they earned an additional 30 minutes of cooking time. All chefs completed the first task; only Lana and Massimo failed to complete the second task. The chefs were then challenged with exemplifying a "stunt" on a plate in a sponsorship segment for Mission: Impossible – The Final Reckoning. The dishes were served at the restaurant Aera at The Well. The winner received $10,000 and two tickets to the movie premiere. The guest diners included Top Chef: Houston/World All-Stars winner Buddha Lo, actor Greg Tarzan Davis, and chefs Patrick Kriss, Binit Pandey, and Martine Bauer.: Winner: Massimo (Pacific Trout en Croûte with Sauce Matelote, Fondue de Tomates Louis XV, Saffron Emulsion); Eliminated: César (Arctic Char Tartare, Turmeric Custard, Fish Tuile & Romaine Lettuce Jam)
326	10	"From Dep Till Dawn"	May 15, 2025	0.40
Quickfire Challenge: Following the Last Chance Kitchen finale, César rejoined the competition. The chefs were given 30 minutes to make dishes using items found inside a dépanneur, a French-Canadian convenience store. They were only allowed to use plastic cutlery and electric cooking equipment, such as pressure cookers, air fryers, and microwaves. The winner received $10,000. The guest judge was comedian Punkie Johnson.: Winner: César (Cheddar & Goat Cheese Popcorn Grits with Apple, Bacon & Celery Leaf Condiment); Elimination Challenge: The chefs used produce from Montreal's rooftop gardens to create dishes inspired by the four seasons. As the winner of the Quickfire Challenge, César was able to choose his season, which became unavailable to his competitors. He chose summer; the others were randomly assigned spring, fall, or winter via knife draw. The dishes were served in the Top Chef kitchen to the judges, Punkie Johnson, and chefs Antonio Park, Fisun Ercan, and Fred Morin. The winner received an advantage in the next Elimination Challenge.: Winner: Shuai (Winter - "Last Bowl of Hot Pot" with Squash, Sweet Potato Dumplings, Fried Enoki Mushrooms & Mushroom Dashi); Eliminated: Vinny (Spring - Lamb Dumplings with Morel Mushroom Consommé, Enoki Mushrooms & English Peas)
327	11	"Calgary, Yahoo!"	May 22, 2025	0.48
Quickfire Challenge: The competition moved to Calgary for the semi-finals. After arriving at the Olympic Plaza, the chefs had 45 minutes to prepare a pancake breakfast inspired by the Calgary Stampede for the judges and 50 guest diners. The pancakes were expected to be handheld and not require utensils to eat. The winner received $10,000. The guest judge was Top Chef Canada Season 1 and Season 5 contestant Connie DeSousa.: Winner: Shuai (Cornmeal Pancake with Scrambled Eggs, Lap Cheong, Cheddar & Chili Crisp Avocado Aioli); Elimination Challenge: To commemorate the ranchers and First Nations people brought together by the Calgary Stampede, the chefs were responsible for cooking dishes incorporating beef and local berries. The contestants chose their cuts of beef (available first-come, first-served) and were randomly assigned their berries via knife draw. As the winner of the previous Elimination Challenge, Shuai received an extra 30 minutes of cooking time. The dishes were served at Rouge restaurant for the judges, Connie DeSousa, guest judges Denia Baltzer and Paul Rogalski, chef John Jackson, and Tsuutʼina Nation interpretive program manager Amber Big Plume. The winner received an advantage in the next Elimination Challenge.: Winner: Massimo (Tenderloin & Elderberries - Tenderloin with Umeboshi, Pickled Elderberry Sauce, Smoked Kohlrabi & Elderberry Soup Purée); Eliminated: Lana (New York Strip & Haskap Berries - Grilled Steak with Pommes Anna, Haskap Berry Condiment & Smoked Haskap Berry Jus)
328	12	"Foraged in Fire"	May 29, 2025	0.46
Elimination Challenge: The chefs went foraging around Quarry Lake in Canmore. They then had to use their foraged ingredients to create dishes over an open campfire at Jumping Pound Ranch. As the winner of the previous Elimination Challenge, Massimo received an extra 30 minutes of cooking time. The winner received $10,000. The guest diners included Cree knowledge keeper Brenda Holder, chef/master forager Tracy Little, Indigenous herbalist Matricia Bauer, Top Chef Canada winner Nicole Gomes, and chefs Paul Rogalski and Scott Iserhoff.: Winner: Shuai (Roasted Cabbage with Rose Hip-Glazed Pork Belly, Sour Cabbage Broth, Lovage & Thatching Ant Togarashi); Eliminated: Massimo (Grilled Trout with Mustard Sauce, Smoked Potato Purée & Bannock with Wildflowers)
329	13	"Viva Milano!"	June 5, 2025	0.54
Quickfire Challenge: The chefs were flown to Milan for the final rounds of the competition. After arriving at Piazza del Duomo, they were given 35 minutes to make risotto. The winner received $15,000. The contestants were also advised the results of this last Quickfire Challenge would not be considered during Judges' Table.: Winner: Tristen (West African Inspired Risotto with Heirloom Tomatoes & Charred Buttered Greens); Elimination Challenge: The chefs competed in a three-part, head-to-head culinary tournament set at Visconti Castle. Each round featured a different ingredient: (1) polenta, (2) beets, and (3) gorgonzola. The winners for the first two rounds were determined by a majority vote between Kristen Kish, Tom Colicchio, Gail Simmons, Top Chef: World All-Stars finalist Ali Ghzawi, chef Andrea Aprea, Olympic athletes Elana Meyers Taylor and Red Gerard, and Paralympic athletes Oksana Masters and Declan Farmer. The winner was declared safe, while the losers had to continue cooking. In addition, the winner of the first round received a $15,000 Delta Air Lines gift card. In the final round, Kristen, Tom, Gail, Ali, and Andrea deliberated on which chef to eliminate before the finale.: Round 1: Polenta; Winner: Shuai (Five-Spice Roast Duck with Creamy Polenta); Round 2: Beets; Safe: Tristen (Glazed Beets, Smoked Beet Purée, Beet Pikliz & Pork Belly); Round 3: Gorgonzola; Safe: Bailey (Polenta Gratinata with Brûléed Gorgonzola); Eliminated: César (Butternut Squash Casserole with Gorgonzola Sauce & Sage Pesto)
330	14	"Finito"	June 12, 2025	0.46
Elimination Challenge: The final three chefs had to cook the best four-course progressive meal of their lives. Each finalist was able to select a previously eliminated competitor to act as their sous chef: Bailey chose Lana, Shuai chose Paula, and Tristen chose Zubair. The meals were served at Cracco in Galleria to several guest diners, including guest judge Clare Smyth, chef/owner Carlo Cracco, Top Chef alums Richard Blais and Gregory Gourdet, Food & Wine editor-in-chief Hunter Lewis, and chefs Sarah Cicolini, Santiago Lastra, Tim Flores, and Genie Kwon.: Bailey: First Course: Polpo e Mozz, Tomato Dashi & Giardiniera; Second Course: Porcini & Robiola Anolini Alpini with Cabbage, Pecan & Brodo; Third Course: Blackened Orata with Calabrian Chili Crunch, Whipped Tahini, Brussels Sprouts & Beets; Fourth Course: Torta di Pizzelle with Zucca, Mascarpone Cream & Espresso Stracciatella Gelato; Shuai: First Course: Panipuri with Scarlet Shrimp, Aji Verde, Salsa Macha & Gazpacho Verde; Second Course: Soup Dumpling Raviolo with Pork & King Crab, Charred Leek Vinaigrette & Lardo; Third Course: Tangcu Ossobuco with Sweet & Sour Sauce, Radicchio, Long Beans & Grits; Fourth Course: Ambrosia - Pear & Orange Jello, Pistachio, Italian Meringue & Coconut; Tristen: First Course: Monkfish with Pickled Turnips, Tempura Broccoli & Baccalà Mbongo; Second Course: Pollo "Dorengo" with Injera Shrimp Toast & Shellfish Jus; Third Course: Oxtail Milanese Crépinette with Carolina Gold Rice Grits, Curry Butter & Bone Marrow Gremolata; Fourth Course: Tropical Root Vegetable Cake with Chutney, Charred Plantain Cream & Cassareep Sorbet; Winner: Tristen; Runners-up: Shuai, Bailey

== Last Chance Kitchen ==
No.	Title	Original air date
1	"Season Premiere, Eh?"	March 13, 2025
Challenge: Eliminated chef Mimi and new contestants Sam and Ying were each instructed to pick one ingredient from the Top Chef pantry; Mimi chose acorn squash, Sam chose eggplant, and Ying chose mushrooms. They then had 30 minutes to cook a dish featuring all three of their ingredients.: Mimi: Squash Soup with Bacon, Sautéed Mushrooms, Crispy Eggplant & Seared Scallop; Sam: Squash and Berbere Purée, Eggplant Nibitashi & Sautéed Berbere Mushrooms; Ying: Mushroom Panzanella Salad with Warm Crispy Bread Croutons; Winner: Sam; Eliminated: Ying
2	"Bacon Got Back"	March 20, 2025
Challenge: Mimi, Sam, and Bailey were given 30 minutes to create an elevated entrée featuring back bacon, also known as Canadian bacon in the United States.: Mimi: Schnitzel with Curry Aioli, Watercress Salad & Plum Chutney; Sam: Pork Sandwich with Maple Chili Aioli, Sautéed Peppers & Glazed Carrots; Bailey: Grilled Peameal Bacon with Dill Yogurt & Maple Syrup Squash Agrodolce; Winner: Bailey; Eliminated: Mimi
3	"Redemption On Ice"	March 27, 2025
Challenge: Prior to the start of the challenge, Sam requested to withdraw from Last Chance Kitchen. Bailey and Anya then competed in an ice hockey-themed cook-off. They were allowed to cook as many dishes as they wanted during their 45-minute time limit. Each dish was judged as either a "goal" or a "miss". The first chef to score a "hat-trick", or three goals, was named the winner.: Bailey: Heirloom Tomato & Peach Salad with Stracciatella, Mint Pistachio Pesto & Parmigiano (Goal); Baked Feta Al Forno, Artichoke, Honey Olive Tapenade with Rye Crackers (Goal); Spiced Lamb with Pickled Tomato Chili Sauce (Goal); Anya: Cauliflower Soup with Crispy Cauliflower (Goal); Halibut with Cauliflower Cream & Chimichurri Sauce (Miss); Scallop with Citrus Sauce (Miss); Winner: Bailey; Eliminated: Anya
4	"Mid-Season Finale Part 1 / Part 2"	April 3, 2025
Challenge: Bailey and Zubair had one hour to make a savory dish and a sweet dish. Both dishes had to incorporate at least three of the same ingredients. After 30 minutes, the chefs were required to present their savory dish to Tom Colicchio. The contestant with Tom's favorite savory dish was allowed to continue making their dessert, while the other was forced to remake their savory dish until it met Tom's standards before moving on. The winner rejoined the main competition and received immunity for their first Elimination Challenge upon their return.: Bailey: Honey Pork with Fennel Caponata; Fennel Pollen Honey Panna Cotta with Golden Raisin & Pine Nut Relish & Honeycomb; Zubair: Seared Scallop with Red Thai Curry Emulsion & Roasted Golden Oyster Mushrooms (Redo); Cardamom Saffron French Toast with Berry Compote & Daulat Ki Chaat; Winner: Bailey; Eliminated: Zubair
5	"Chop to It"	April 10, 2025
Challenge: Corwin and Kat spent their first 10 minutes prepping their dishes, not knowing which protein they would have to use. Once their prep period was over, they were not allowed to grab additional ingredients or equipment from the Top Chef pantry, with the exception of pots and pans. Their knives were also confiscated at that point. Tom then brought out their required protein, salt cod, and gave the chefs 20 minutes to finish cooking.: Corwin: Coconut Green Curry Inspired Salt Cod with Burnt Scallions; Kat: Salt Cod Panzanella with Fish Sauce Vinaigrette, Pickled Romanesco & Maitake Mushrooms; Winner: Kat; Eliminated: Corwin
6	"In A Pickle"	April 17, 2025
Challenge: Kat and Katianna were presented with a wide variety of pickled items, such as kimchi, capers, umeboshi, and pickled eggs. Each chef selected three pickled ingredients that their opponent was required to use. Kat received asparagus, cherry peppers, and green beans, while Katianna received cocktail onions, sweet banana peppers, and beets. They then had 30 minutes to create cohesive dishes.: Kat: Pickled Celery Root Purée, Corn Relish with Broad Bean Pickle & Cherry Pepper Pickles, Shrimp & Tempura Asparagus; Katianna: Beet Marinaded Salmon with Pickled Beets, Gribiche Tartar with Onion Pickle, Pepper Pickle & Beet Greens; Winner: Katianna; Eliminated: Kat
7	"Dough Over"	April 24, 2025
Challenge: Katianna and Henry were given 30 minutes to make dishes using freshly-made dough.: Katianna: Pot Pie Seafood Chowder with Scallops, Mushrooms, Vadouvan Crust & Crumbled Dough; Henry: Pan Seared Wonton with Pork, Soy, Scallion with Soy Sour Broth & Garlic Scallion Emulsion; Winner: Katianna; Eliminated: Henry
8	"Grandma Chic Reheated"	May 1, 2025
Challenge: Katianna and Paula had 30 minutes to modernize a nostalgia-filled dish. Their dishes were also required to include a sauce component.: Katianna: Seared Scallops with Snap Peas & Wasabi Greens with Potato, Onion Sauce & Yuzu, Soy, Ginger Sauce; Paula: Encocado Sauced Lobster with Southern Succotash; Winner: Katianna; Eliminated: Paula
9	"Last Chance Kitchen Finale Part 1 / Part 2"	May 8, 2025
Challenge (Part 1): First, Katianna and César had to choose one previously eliminated Last Chance Kitchen competitor to act as their "stunt double" for the challenge. Katianna chose Kat and César chose Corwin. Then, acting as "directors", Katianna and César had to verbally instruct Kat and Corwin on how to cook their dishes within the 30-minute time limit. Kat and Corwin were only allowed to respond with the phrases "Yes, Chef" or "No, Chef".: Katianna: Burrata with Roasted Bacon, Kimchi Condiment & Fried Brussels Sprouts; César: Pear Cream with Grilled Pear, Roasted Maitake Mushrooms, Kumquats & Sorrel; Winner: César; Challenge (Part 2): In the first round, Katianna and César had 30 minutes to create their best amuse-bouche. Tom Colicchio then performed a blind tasting of both dishes and selected his favorite. In the second round, the chefs had 20 minutes to create any fully composed dish of their choosing. Since César won the previous challenge, he only needed to win one round, whereas Katianna had to win two rounds. The overall winner returned to the main competition.: Round 1: Katianna: Seared Tuna with Smoked Shoyu, Celery Root Relish & Caper Aioli (Win); César: Gougère with White Chocolate & Blue Cheese Filling; Round 2: Katianna: Vadouvan Cauliflower & Potato Soup with Roasted Cauliflower, Raisins, Cilantro & Lime; César: Zucchini Spiral with Salsa Pipián, Fried Pepitas & Blistered Blueberries (Win); Winner: César; Eliminated: Katianna
