= Top Chef: Carolinas =

Season 23 of American television series

- Season 23
- Hosted by: Kristen Kish
- Judges: Tom Colicchio; Gail Simmons
- No. of contestants: 15
- Winner: Rhoda Magbitang
- Runners-up: Sherry Cardoso; Laurence Louie
- Location: Charlotte, North Carolina; Greenville, South Carolina
- No. of episodes: 14

Release
- Original network: Bravo
- Original release: March 9 – June 8, 2026

Season chronology
- ← Previous; Destination Canada

Top Chef: Carolinas is the twenty-third season of the American reality television series Top Chef. Filming was centered around Charlotte, North Carolina, with additional episodes shot in Greenville, South Carolina. It premiered on TV on March 9, 2026, though early access to the first episode began on March 3 on Peacock, Bravo's YouTube channel, and video on demand.

Last Chance Kitchen returned with a couple of format changes. The web series began after the third and fourth eliminations, leaving the first two eliminated chefs without second chances. In addition, only one contestant was allowed to rejoin the main competition.

The season concluded on June 8, 2026. In the season finale, Rhoda Magbitang was declared the winner over runners-up Sherry Cardoso and Laurence Louie. No Fan Favorite vote was held.

== Production ==
Filming for Top Chef: Carolinas took place between August and October 2025. The season was produced in partnership with the Charlotte Regional Visitors Authority (CRVA) and VisitGreenvilleSC. The show was approved for a North Carolina Film and Entertainment Grant, receiving a $2.5 million grant rebate. The CRVA paid $1.2 million for the "integration of Charlotte assets" into Top Chef; these included verbal mentions, challenges, and reality segments filmed throughout Charlotte; highlights of local history, culture, and ingredients; and the participation of local chefs and restaurateurs. The Top Chef kitchen set was built inside a warehouse in Steele Creek, North Carolina. Grocery shopping segments were filmed at the Uptown Charlotte Whole Foods Market.

The season's US$250,000 grand prize was furnished by a new sponsor, Graza Olive Oil, while the Quickfire Challenge's "quick cash" prizes were once again provided by Wells Fargo. Other sponsors included Bosch Home Appliances, Cracker Barrel, Duke's Mayonnaise, Finish Dishwasher Detergent and Additives, Josh Cellars Wine, Morton Salt, and Talenti Gelato & Sorbetto.

== Contestants ==
Fifteen chefs competed in Top Chef: Carolinas. The cast notably included a pair of identical twins, Brandon and Jonathan Dearden, and a pair of life partners, Jennifer Lee Jackson and Justin Tootla, competing against each other.

| Name | Hometown | Current Residence (Note: The contestants' city and state of residence during time of filming.) |
|---|---|---|
| Sieger Bayer | Chicago, Illinois | |
| Jaspratap "Jassi" Bindra | Kanpur, India | Houston, Texas |
| Sherry Cardoso | Belo Horizonte, Brazil | Brooklyn, New York |
| Brittany Cochran | Columbus, Ohio | Charlotte, North Carolina |
| Oscar Diaz | Chicago, Illinois | Durham, North Carolina |
| Brandon Dearden | Sterling, Virginia | Hamilton, Montana |
| Jonathan Dearden | Sterling, Virginia | Alexandria, Virginia |
| Duyen Ha | Binghamton, New York | Los Angeles, California |
| Jennifer Lee Jackson | Statham, Georgia | Suttons Bay, Michigan/Detroit, Michigan |
| Anthony Jones | Sunderland, Maryland | Alexandria, Virginia |
| Day Anaїs Joseph | Fort Lauderdale, Florida | Atlanta, Georgia |
| Laurence Louie | Boston, Massachusetts | Quincy, Massachusetts |
| Rhoda Magbitang | Antipolo, Philippines | Kailua-Kona, Hawaii |
| Justin Tootla | Detroit, Michigan | Suttons Bay, Michigan/Detroit, Michigan |
| Nana Araba Wilmot | Cherry Hill, New Jersey | |

== Contestant progress ==
| Episode # | | 1 | 2 | 3 | 4 | 5 | 6 | 7 | 8 | 9 | 10 | 11 | 12 | 13 | 14 |
|---|---|---|---|---|---|---|---|---|---|---|---|---|---|---|---|
| Quickfire Challenge Winner(s) | | Jennifer; Jonathan; Laurence | Laurence | Anthony | Jennifer; Justin; Sieger | Brandon | N/A | Anthony; Brandon; Jonathan | N/A | Anthony | Rhoda | Rhoda | N/A | Rhoda | N/A |
| Contestant | | Elimination Challenge Results | | | | | | | | | | | | | |
| 1 | Rhoda | WIN^{1} | WIN^{1} | LOW | IN | OUT | | | | LOW^{3} | HIGH | IN | WIN | HIGH | WINNER |
| 2 | Sherry | IN | IN | LOW | HIGH | HIGH | HIGH | HIGH | HIGH | IN | IN | WIN | HIGH | WIN | RUNNER-UP |
| 2 | Laurence | IN | IN | WIN^{1} | HIGH | LOW | WIN^{1} | HIGH | IN | WIN | WIN | IN | HIGH | LOW | RUNNER-UP |
| 4 | Jonathan | HIGH | HIGH | LOW | IN | IN | LOW | IN | IN | HIGH | HIGH | LOW | LOW | OUT | |
| 5 | Sieger | IN | HIGH | LOW | WIN^{1} | IN | OUT | | LOW^{2} | IN | LOW | HIGH | OUT | | |
| 6 | Anthony | HIGH | HIGH | HIGH | LOW | WIN^{1} | HIGH | WIN^{1} | IN | IN | HIGH | OUT | | | |
| 7 | Duyen | HIGH | IN | LOW | IN | HIGH | HIGH | LOW | WIN | IN | OUT | | | | |
| 8 | Oscar | IN | HIGH | LOW | IN | LOW | IN | LOW | IN | OUT | | | | | |
| 9 | Brandon | HIGH | IN | HIGH | IN | IN | HIGH | IN | OUT | | | | | | |
| 10 | Jennifer | IN | HIGH | LOW | LOW | IN | IN | IN | MED | | | | | | |
| 11 | Justin | IN | LOW | LOW | IN | IN | LOW | OUT | | | | | | | |
| 12 | Brittany | IN | HIGH | LOW | OUT | | | | | | | | | | |
| 13 | Nana | LOW | LOW | OUT | | | | | | | | | | | |
| 14 | Jassi | IN | OUT | | | | | | | | | | | | |
| 15 | Day | OUT | | | | | | | | | | | | | |

^Note 1: The chef(s) won immunity for the next Elimination Challenge.
^Note 2: Due to Jennifer's medical removal and Justin declining his invitation to take her spot in order to look after her at the hospital, Sieger was reinstated into the competition.
^Note 3: Rhoda won Last Chance Kitchen and returned to the competition.

(WINNER) The chef won the season and was crowned "Top Chef".
(RUNNER-UP) The chef was a runner-up for the season.
(WIN) The chef won the Elimination Challenge.
(HIGH) The chef was selected as one of the top entries in the Elimination Challenge but did not win.
(IN) The chef was not selected as one of the top or bottom entries in the Elimination Challenge and was safe.
(LOW) The chef was selected as one of the bottom entries in the Elimination Challenge but was not eliminated.
(OUT) The chef lost the Elimination Challenge.
(MED) The chef was medically removed from the competition.

== Episodes ==
| No. overall | No. in season | Title | Original release date | US viewers (millions) |
|---|---|---|---|---|
| 331 | 1 | "Carolina Roots" | March 9, 2026 | 0.37 |
Quickfire Challenge: The chefs, split into teams of three, were asked to cook any dish of their choosing. In lieu of a traditional timer, the teams had however long it took a professional driver to complete 23 laps around the Charlotte Motor Speedway. In addition, they were not allowed to plate their dishes until the final lap. The winning team received $15,000. The guest judges were professional stock car racing drivers Kyle Busch and Jimmie Johnson.: Red Team: Anthony, Brandon, Sieger; Blue Team: Jennifer, Jonathan, Laurence; Yellow Team: Day, Duyen, Nana; Green Team: Brittany, Jassi, Justin; Purple Team: Oscar, Rhoda, Sherry; Winners: Jennifer, Jonathan, and Laurence (Crab & Shrimp Hushpuppy with Harissa Aioli, Napa & Peach Salad); Elimination Challenge: The chefs were randomly assigned one of five varieties of sweet potato (Covington, Norton, Purple Majesty, Murasaki, or Carolina Ruby) to highlight in their dishes. The contestants presented their dishes in groups of three, based on their designated sweet potato, though they competed individually. One person from each group was eligible to win the challenge, while those with the judges' least favorite dishes faced potential elimination. The dishes were served at the restaurant La Belle Helene. The winner received immunity for the next Elimination Challenge. The guest judges were Top Chef: Charleston/Top Chef: All-Stars L.A. contestant Jamie Lynch and chefs Sean Brock, Chayil Johnson, and Cheetie Kumar.: Winner: Rhoda (Soy-Glazed Covington with Miso Sweet Potato Purée & Lime Crème Fraîche); Eliminated: Day (Roasted Carolina Ruby with Herbes de Provence, Sos Kreyòl & Roasted Snapper)
| 332 | 2 | "Puckerbutt" | March 16, 2026 | 0.28 |
Quickfire Challenge: The chefs had 30 minutes to make savory dishes using regional ingredients inspired by a gelato or sorbet flavor for a Talenti-sponsored challenge. Their dishes also had to be paired with one scoop of their chosen gelato or sorbet. The winner received $10,000. The guest judge was Top Chef: Boston winner Mei Lin.: Winner: Laurence (Pacific Coast Pistachio - Lamb Börek with Apricot Jam, Pickled Tomatillos & Pistachios); Elimination Challenge: The chefs visited the PuckerButt Pepper Company farms, owned by chili pepper breeder Ed Currie - the creator of the Carolina Reaper and Pepper X. They were then separated into two teams and asked to create seven-course menus with increasingly spicier dishes. The winner received immunity for the next Elimination Challenge. The guest judges were Currie and Heatonist founder/CEO Noah Chaimberg.: Red Team: Brandon, Duyen, Jassi, Justin, Laurence, Nana, Sherry; Green Team: Anthony, Brittany, Jennifer, Jonathan, Oscar, Rhoda, Sieger; Winning Team: Green Team; Winner: Rhoda (Pepper Braised Short Rib, Chili Pickled Pearl Onions & Blistered Cayenne); Eliminated: Jassi (Braised Lamb Vindaloo with Flaky Paratha, Potato Mash, Yogurt & Lime Shot)
| 333 | 3 | "True Colors" | March 23, 2026 | 0.34 |
Quickfire Challenge: The chefs had 30 minutes to turn livermush into an elevated dish. The winner received $10,000. The guest judge was chef Emeril Lagasse.: Winner: Anthony (Livermush Pâté with Tomatoes, Cayenne & Livermush Croutons); Elimination Challenge: In honor of North Carolina's textile industry, the chefs were required to create dishes featuring at least two elements colored with natural food dyes, such as activated charcoal, blueberries, chlorophyll, hibiscus, matcha, saffron, turmeric, and squid ink. The dishes were served at the restaurant Supperland. The winner received immunity for the next Elimination Challenge. The guest judges were Lagasse, baker Amirah Kassem, and Supperland owners Jamie Brown and Jeff Tonidandel.: Winner: Laurence (Bao Flight - Yellow Chili Pork, Green Curry Beef & Strawberry Matcha); Eliminated: Nana (Chicken Galantine & Yassa Onion Purée)
| 334 | 4 | "Pick a Side" | March 30, 2026 | 0.34 |
Quickfire Challenge: In reference to the Wright brothers and the first successful airplane flight at Kitty Hawk, North Carolina, the chefs, split into groups of three, had 30 minutes to create a trio of dishes to be paired with a wine flight (one red wine, one white wine, and one rosé) for a Josh Cellars-sponsored challenge. The foundation of each team's "food flight" had to be based on the same dish or ingredient, though each preparation needed to be distinct, such as a flight of sliders featuring different proteins. The winning team received $15,000. The guest judge was Top Chef: Destination Canada winner Tristen Epps-Long.: Red Team: Anthony, Duyen, Jonathan; Blue Team: Jennifer, Justin, Sieger; Green Team: Brittany, Brandon, Oscar; Cream Team: Laurence, Rhoda, Sherry; Winners: Jennifer (Cabernet Sauvignon - Soft Scrambled Eggs with Roasted Grape Verjus & Croutons), Justin (Rosé - Braised Artichoke, Poached Quail Egg & Rosé Mayonnaise), and Sieger (Pinot Grigio - Poached Peaches with Sabayon); Elimination Challenge: The chefs toured Deep Roots CPS Farm, an urban farm specializing in regenerative agriculture, where they harvested fresh produce. They were then tasked with transforming classic Southern side dishes into main courses, including Hoppin' John, hoecakes, red rice, fried okra, potato salad, collard greens, and smothered cabbage. The dishes were served to the judges and 40 guest diners at the restaurant Fine & Fettle. The winner received immunity for the next Elimination Challenge. The guest judges were Epps-Long and restaurateurs Greg and Subrina Collier.: Winner: Sieger (Braised Okra & Pork Belly with Seeded Tempura); Eliminated: Brittany (Collard Wrapped Pork & Fennel Sausage with Smoked Tomato Butter Sauce)
| 335 | 5 | "Cut and Dry" | April 6, 2026 | 0.41 |
Quickfire Challenge: The chefs were tested on their ability to improvise by creating dishes themed after three keywords provided by children invited to the Top Chef kitchen by comedian and guest judge Fortune Feimster. Their keywords were "Christmas", "Colorado", and "puffified". The contestants had 30 minutes to cook and were free to interpret the keywords however they wished. Halfway through the challenge, the kids added a mandatory ingredient for the chefs to use: corn nuts. The winner received $10,000.: Winner: Brandon (Colorado Vanilla Ice Cream with Nutella, Corn Nut Crunch & Maple Syrup); Elimination Challenge: The chefs were challenged to make dishes showcasing dehydrated components. The dishes were served at the U.S. National Whitewater Center. The winner received immunity for the next Elimination Challenge. The guest judges were Top Chef: Wisconsin runner-up Savannah Miller and restaurateurs Katy and Joe Kindred.: Winner: Anthony (Cured Salmon with Banga Broth & Dehydrated Smoked Oyster Infused Rice); Eliminated: Rhoda (Squid Ink Crusted Roasted Monkfish with Squid Ink Adobo Sauce, Dehydrated Broccoli & Garlic Chip)
| 336 | 6 | "Going Whole Hog" | April 13, 2026 | 0.34 |
Elimination Challenge: Competing in two teams, the chefs had to work through the night to prepare a whole hog barbecue at Splendor Pond in Mooresville. As the winner of the previous Elimination Challenge, Anthony became the captain of one team and had to choose the opposing team's captain; he picked Justin. The remaining chefs were then selected via schoolyard pick. Each team was responsible for cooking five dishes featuring pork shoulder, pork loin, pork belly, ham, and chopped pork. Their dishes were served in five head-to-head rounds to the judges, Top Chef: Wisconsin contestant and guest judge Michelle Wallace, and a group of local pitmasters from across the region, who voted for their favorite dish in each match-up (the pitmasters counted as one collective vote, decided by majority). The contestant who garnered the most votes won the round, earning themselves $5,000 and one point for their team. The first team to reach three points wins (the winners of each round are listed below in **bold**). While the judges declared an individual winner, who received immunity for the next Elimination Challenge, all members of the winning team received $500 each. In addition, late at night during the chefs' cooking period, Tom Colicchio stopped by and invited them to participate in an optional side challenge: making the best s'more. Oscar won with a spicy chili s'more and received $500.: Red Team: Anthony, Brandon, Duyen, Laurence, Sherry; Gray Team: Jennifer, Jonathan, Justin, Oscar, Sieger; Round 1 (Shoulder): **Sherry** vs. Justin; Round 2 (Loin): **Laurence** vs. Sieger; Round 3 (Belly): **Brandon** vs. Jonathan; Round 4 (Ham): Anthony vs. **Jennifer**; Round 5 (Chopped): Duyen vs. **Oscar**; Winning Team: Red Team; Winner: Laurence (Smoked Pork Loin, Pork Floss, Rice & "East Meets East" Sauce); Eliminated: Sieger (Pork Loin, Crispy Ear Terrine & Mustard-Based Carrot BBQ Sauce)
| 337 | 7 | "Desserts Fit for a Queen" | April 20, 2026 | 0.36 |
Quickfire Challenge: In teams of three, the chefs had 45 minutes to create new country-style breakfast, lunch, and dinner plates inspired by Cracker Barrel's all-day menu for a sponsored challenge. However, only one person from each team was allowed to cook at a time. The winning team received $12,000. The guest judges were Southern Charm cast members Madison LeCroy and Craig Conover.: Orange Team: Laurence, Oscar, Sherry; Yellow Team: Anthony, Brandon, Jonathan; Green Team: Duyen, Jennifer, Justin; Winners: Anthony (Lunch - Fried Green Tomato & Country Ham Sandwich with Salmon Roe & Avocado), Brandon (Breakfast - Eggs Benedict, Rushed Hashbrowns & Shortcut Hollandaise), and Jonathan (Dinner - Smothered Steak with Bourbon Pan Gravy); Elimination Challenge: In homage to Queen Charlotte of Mecklenburg-Strelitz (the namesake of Charlotte, North Carolina, and its nickname "The Queen City") and her love of decadent sweets, the chefs were asked to make desserts "fit for a queen". They were provided a variety of existing Southern desserts to use as inspiration: ambrosia, apple stack cake, Atlantic Beach pie, banana pudding, caramel cake, chocolate chess pie, coconut cake, Moravian sugar cake, and sonker. To increase the challenge's difficulty, the contestants were given only three hours to cook. The dishes were served in the Top Chef kitchen to the judges, actress and guest judge Melissa Benoist, and 60 guest diners. The diners voted for a winner, who received immunity for the next Elimination Challenge, while the judges determined which chef to eliminate.: Winner: Anthony (Apple Stack Cake - Apple Semifreddo with Apple Coulis, Spice Cake & Apple Butters); Eliminated: Justin (Ambrosia Salad - Cherry Granita, Roasted Pineapple, Brown Butter Walnuts & Raspberry Whipped Cream); Medically Removed: Jennifer (Note: Jennifer was removed from the competition by production due to complications related to a shoulder injury she sustained before the season began filming.)
| 338 | 8 | "Restaurant Wars" | April 27, 2026 | 0.37 |
Elimination Challenge: Due to Jennifer's medical removal and Justin declining his invitation to take her spot in order to look after her at the hospital, Sieger was reinstated into the competition. The chefs then competed in Restaurant Wars at The Casey by Beau Monde event space. Each team had 36 hours to develop a three-course menu (with each course offering two different options), decorate their restaurant, train their waitstaff, and serve their dishes to the judges and 100 guest diners. They were also responsible for preparing take-out orders. While the judges declared an individual winner, each member of the winning team received a vacation package to Universal Orlando. Beginning with this Elimination Challenge, immunity was no longer available as a reward. The guest judges were chef Michael Mina and James Beard Foundation CEO Clare Reichenbach.: Carolina Queen: Anthony (EC), Duyen (FOH), Laurence, Sherry; First Course: She-Crab Cake with She-Crab Bisque (Sherry); Cheese Puff with Country Ham, Comté & Sauce Mornay (Duyen); Second Course: Red Rice with Smoked Oysters, Pickled Okra, Crab Roe, Béarnaise (Anthony); Crispy Pork Belly with Collard Greens, Fried Scallion Corn Bread & Pickles (Laurence); Third Course: "PB & J" Peanut Panna Cotta, Compressed Fruits, Oat Crumble & Cheerwine Gel (Sherry); Pecan Baklava with Bourbon Maple Syrup & Sweet Potato Crème Anglaise (Laurence); Tierra Reina: Brandon, Jonathan, Sieger (EC), Oscar (FOH); First Course: Carolina Ruby Sweet Potato Tostada with Crema & Salsa Negra (Sieger); Snapper Aguachile with Plantain Chip (Jonathan); Second Course: Cod Pescado a la Veracruzana with Stewed Tomatoes, Castelvetrano Olives & Capers (Jonathan); Tongue & Cheek Barbacoa with Duo of Salsas (Oscar); Third Course: "Crémeuxso" with Crema Catalana & Benne Cracker (Sieger); Arroz con Leche with Cheerwine Cherry Jelly (Brandon); Winning Team: Carolina Queen; Winner: Duyen; Eliminated: Brandon
| 339 | 9 | "The Ultimate Dinner Party" | May 4, 2026 | 0.33 |
Quickfire Challenge: Following the Last Chance Kitchen finale, Rhoda rejoined the competition. The chefs were then moved to Greenville, South Carolina, where they were asked to cater a dinner party at Soby's restaurant in a combined Quickfire and Elimination Challenge. In the Quickfire portion, the contestants created appetizers featuring Duke's Mayonnaise for the pre-dinner cocktail hour. The winner received $10,000.: Winner: Anthony (Crab Dumpling with Chili Crunch & Mayo); Elimination Challenge: For the Elimination portion of the dinner party, the chefs were responsible for serving an eight-course menu, consisting of raw, salad, soup, seafood, grain, poultry, red meat, and dessert courses. Each person was solely responsible for executing one course. The guest judges for both challenges were Top Chef: Destination Canada runner-up Shuai Wang, Soby's owner Carl Sobocinski, and a host of other Greenville chefs and restaurateurs, including Carrie Morey, Babette Jones, Khailing Neoh, Tarcy Harger, Joe Cash, Jorge Barrales Jr., and Tania C. Harris.: Winner: Laurence (Soup Course - "Long's Tāng" Chicken & Corn Egg Drop Soup with Marinated Bok Choy & Grilled Corn); Eliminated: Oscar (Red Meat Course - Short Rib Sancocho with Yuca, Butternut Squash, Carrots & Rice)
| 340 | 10 | "Hook, Line & Dinner" | May 11, 2026 | 0.38 |
Quickfire Challenge: The chefs met at Green Pond Landing in Anderson and competed in a two-part mise en place race for a Finish-sponsored challenge. In the first heat, the contestants were divided into two teams. Each team chose one member to compete in a single mise en place task; the first person to complete the task earned a point for their team. The first team to win three out of five possible rounds advanced to the second half of the Quickfire (the winners of each round are listed below in **bold**). In the second heat, the chefs competed individually, with 20 minutes to create a dish featuring their mise en place ingredients. The winner received $10,000. As the winner of the previous Elimination Challenge, Laurence automatically advanced to the second heat.: Part 1: Team Challenge; Red Team: Duyen, Rhoda, Sieger; Blue Team: Anthony, Jonathan, Sherry; Round 1 (Seed and Hull One Pint of Scuppernong Grapes): Sieger vs. **Jonathan**; Round 2 (Peel and Devein Twelve Shrimp): **Duyen** vs. Sherry; Round 3 (Crack and Pick One Ounce of Pecans): **Sieger** vs. Jonathan; Round 4 (Shuck and Kernel Five Ears of Corn): **Rhoda** vs. Anthony; Winning Team: Red Team; Part 2: Individual Challenge; Winner: Rhoda (Warm Corn, Pecan & Shrimp Salad with Scuppernong & Tamarind Vinaigrette); Elimination Challenge: The chefs went fishing out on Lake Hartwell. They then had to make dishes using the fish they caught, to be served at Abyss restaurant. The judges awarded advantages to the chefs for catching the smallest, largest, and most fish. Duyen received an extra $5 and $50 towards her shopping budget for catching the smallest fish and most fish, respectively, while Jonathan received an extra 30 minutes of cooking time for catching the largest fish. Regardless of whether they caught fish or not, everyone received three spotted bass to cook with. The guest judges were chef James London and actress Danielle Brooks.: Winner: Laurence (Cantonese Steamed Fish with Ginger, Scallions, Fried Leeks, Rice & Bok Choy); Eliminated: Duyen (Canh Chua with Pineapple, Tomatoes & Bok Choy)
| 341 | 11 | "Down the Rabbit Hole" | May 18, 2026 | 0.20 |
Quickfire Challenge: The chefs gathered at Greenville's Unity Park, where they were asked to create dishes based on elements voted on by fans across Top Chef's social media. The first poll asked which ingredient should be highlighted: peaches, boiled peanuts, or pawpaw. The fans voted for peaches. The second poll, revealed after the contestants' grocery shopping period, asked how much time they should receive: 15, 20, or 30 minutes. The fans voted for 30 minutes. The third poll, revealed with 15 minutes remaining in the challenge, asked which twist should be thrown at the chefs: turn their dish into a sandwich, move to the cooking station to their right, or add a foam element to their dish. The fans voted for the station swap. The winner received $10,000. The guest judges were The Try Guys cast member Keith Habersberger and executive producer Rachel Ann Cole.: Winner: Rhoda (Peach & Burrata Tostada with Corn Relish & Chipotle Aioli); Elimination Challenge: In honor of the Swamp Rabbit Trail and Michelin North America, whose headquarters is located in Greenville, the chefs were challenged to make Michelin star-level dishes featuring rabbit. As the winner of the previous Elimination Challenge, Laurence received an extra $100 toward his shopping budget. The dishes were served at Topsoil Restaurant to the judges and 24 guest diners. Similar to how the Michelin Guide reviews restaurants, several VIP diners were hidden among the regular diners, who voted anonymously for the winner. The judges then deliberated on which chef to eliminate. The guest judges were former professional cyclist Brent Bookwalter and chefs Niki Nakayama and Adam Cooke.: Winner: Sherry (Jerk Braised Rabbit, Yuca & Plantain Mofongo, Avocado Crema); Eliminated: Anthony (Braised Rabbit Legs & Thighs, Carrot Ginger Purée, Rabbit Loin, Carrot Top Salsa Verde, Rabbit Jus & Carrot)
| 342 | 12 | "Appalachian Celebration" | May 25, 2026 | 0.40 |
Elimination Challenge: Before heading back to Charlotte, the chefs took a detour to Asheville, North Carolina, where they met with Top Chef: Houston alum Ashleigh Shanti and other local chefs to learn about Appalachian cuisine and the city's rebuilding efforts after Hurricane Helene. The contestants were then asked to create dishes featuring at least two Appalachian ingredients and serve them to the judges and 200 community members for a one-night event, held at the Union Exchange event space in Monroe, celebrating Asheville's resilience. As the winner of the previous Elimination Challenge, Sherry was allowed to choose two Appalachian ingredients from the pantry that would become off-limits to her competitors; she chose October beans and chow chow. The guest judges were Shanti and chefs Meherwan Irani and William Dissen.: Winner: Rhoda ("Filipino Egg Roll" - Stuffed Cabbage, Pawpaw Ponzu, Apple Butter Mostarda & Buckwheat Chili Crisp); Eliminated: Sieger (Chicken Liver Pâté, Rye Cracker, Pickled Watermelon Rind & Greasy Beans)
| 343 | 13 | "Plate Expectations" | June 1, 2026 | 0.35 |
Quickfire Challenge: Before the contestants arrived in the Top Chef kitchen, Tom Colicchio cooked a dish for Kristen Kish and Gail Simmons to eat, leaving only scraps left on the plate. The four remaining chefs then had 30 minutes to recreate his mystery dish. To deduce its identity, each person was allowed to ask Tom five "yes or no" questions during the cook (20 questions in total). They were also permitted to look at and smell, but not taste, the remnants of his dish. After time expired, the dish was revealed to be a billi bi (a creamy, mussel-based French soup) with poached cod, chorizo, and ají dulce. The chef whose creation was closest to the original received $20,000.: Winner: Rhoda (Poached Cod with Mussels Steamed in White Wine & Paprika); Elimination Challenge: The chefs created dishes that were plated in unique, unconventional vessels. As the winner of the previous Elimination Challenge, Rhoda was able to choose her vessel first. The dishes were served at Henrietta's restaurant. The guest judges were actress Liza Koshy, chef Jon Yao, and Food & Wine editor-in-chief Hunter Lewis.: Winner: Sherry (Gochujang Braised Short Rib, Pear Kimchi, Rice & Banchan); Eliminated: Jonathan (Pumpkin Seed Dinner Roll with Pumpkin Purée Compound Butter)
| 344 | 14 | "The Final Toast" | June 8, 2026 | 0.30 |
Elimination Challenge: The final three chefs had to cook the best four-course progressive meal of their lives. Each course needed to represent a toast to someone or something that had a significant impact on them. Each finalist received help from one sous-chef, consisting of previously eliminated competitors Jonathan, Sieger, and Anthony. Sherry was assisted by Anthony, Rhoda was assisted by Sieger, and Laurence was assisted by Jonathan. The meals were served at Peppervine restaurant to several guest diners, including Top Chef: Chicago winner Stephanie Izard, Top Chef: Colorado winner Joe Flamm, Top Chef: Kentucky and Top Chef: World All-Stars runner-up Sara Bradley, Food & Wine editor-in-chief Hunter Lewis, and chefs Eric Ferguson, Camari Mick, Nok Suntaranon, Brandon Jew, and Val Cantu. Izard (Laurence), Flamm (Rhoda), and Bradley (Sherry) were permitted to give advice to the chefs before cooking their final meal.: Laurence: First Course: Pork & Century Egg Congee with Youtiao; Second Course: Dim Sum - Daikon Cake, Lobster Sticky Rice, Scallop & Shrimp Roll with Fresh Tofu Skins; Third Course: Seared Duck Breast with Sorghum Glaze, Fermented Tofu, Hoisin & Duck Broth; Fourth Course: Broken Birthday Cake with Peaches & Caramelized White Chocolate Cream; Rhoda: First Course: Roasted Sweet Potato with Miso Butter, Fresh Uni & Charred Sweet Potato Leaves; Second Course: Abalone Lugaw with Abalone Liver Mousse; Third Course: Grilled Eggplant Omelet with XO Sauce, Vinegar, Crispy Pork Belly, Chili & Fish Sauce; Fourth Course: Braised Short Rib with Liver Sauce & Vegetables; Sherry: First Course: Moqueca with Frog Legs & Langoustine, Chayote, Zucchini & Shiitake Mushrooms; Second Course: Potato Dumplings with Pig Ear Broth, Matsutake & Pickled Hon-Shimeji Mushrooms; Third Course: Tournedos Rossini with Braised Beef Tongue, Carolina Reaper Leche de Tigre & Seared Foie Gras; Fourth Course: Hominy Porridge with Corn Husk Ice Cream, Toasted Brazil Nuts, Candied Peanuts & Candied Ginger; Winner: Rhoda; Runners-up: Sherry, Laurence

== Last Chance Kitchen ==
| No. | Title | Original air date |
|---|---|---|
| 1 | "Back to Basics" | March 30, 2026 |
Challenge: Nana and Brittany had 30 minutes to create redemption-worthy dishes that represent themselves on a plate.: Nana: Pan Seared Salmon with Tomato Salad & Curry Sauce; Brittany: Pan Seared Halibut with Grilled Corn & Tomato Panzanella; Winner: Nana; Eliminated: Brittany
| 2 | "Claws Out" | April 6, 2026 |
Challenge: Nana and Rhoda had 30 minutes to put their own spin on she-crab soup. However, they were not allowed to make another soup.: Nana: Crab Mac and Cheese; Rhoda: Singaporean Chili Crab; Winner: Rhoda; Eliminated: Nana
| 3 | "Surprise Showdown" | April 13, 2025 |
Challenge: A newly eliminated chef did not enter Last Chance Kitchen. Instead, Tom Colicchio allowed Rhoda, Nana, and Brittany to compete for $5,000, with no elimination or re-entry stakes. They were presented with a random assortment of ingredients, which had been purchased by the non-eliminated contestants: Korean melon, pickled Vietnamese eggplant, li hing mui, durian, banana flowers, duck heads, coriander, bitter melon, shrimp and crab boil concentrate, strawberry jellies, fish sauce, fried fish with peanuts, and liver spread. Rhoda, Nana, and Brittany had 20 minutes to create cohesive dishes using two ingredients of their choosing, available on a first-come, first-served basis, along with two mandatory ingredients chosen by Tom. Rhoda chose li hing mui and fish sauce, Nana chose coriander and fried fish with peanuts, Brittany chose shrimp and crab boil concentrate and Korean melon, and Tom chose duck heads and pickled Vietnamese eggplant. As a bonus, Rhoda would have had the option of selecting the next Last Chance Kitchen challenge had she won, but was unable to do so.: Rhoda: Miso-Style Soup with Shiitake Mushrooms & Tofu; Nana: Fried Green Tomato with Coconut Peanut Sauce; Brittany: Poached Shrimp with Cucumber, Carrot, Eggplant & Melon; Winner: Nana
| 4 | "Let's Get Weird" | April 20, 2025 |
Challenge: Rhoda and Justin had 30 minutes to devise a dish using three random keywords: "alien", "glamorous", and "whipped".: Rhoda: Mushroom Toast with Whipped Mascarpone & Caviar; Justin: Whipped Beef Tallow, Scallops, Tuna Tartare & Roasted Olives; Winner: Rhoda; Eliminated: Justin
| 5 | "Last Bites" | April 27, 2025 |
Challenge: Rhoda and Brandon had 45 minutes to make three-course progressive menus for a Last Chance Kitchen edition of Restaurant Wars. Each dish was required to be bite-sized. The winner returned to the main competition.: Rhoda: First Course: Roasted Carrot Salad with Goat Cheese & Pistachio Aillade; Second Course: Seared Scallop with Grilled Leaks & Romesco Sauce; Third Course: Roasted Duck Breast with Grilled Radicchio & Grape Jus; Brandon: First Course: Scallop Crudo Taco with Apple, Fennel & Yuzu; Second Course: Hushpuppy with Trout Roe & Andouille Sausage Aioli; Third Course: Quail Egg Raviolo with Ricotta, Country Ham & Caviar; Winner: Rhoda; Eliminated: Brandon
