= Josh Cellars =

American winery

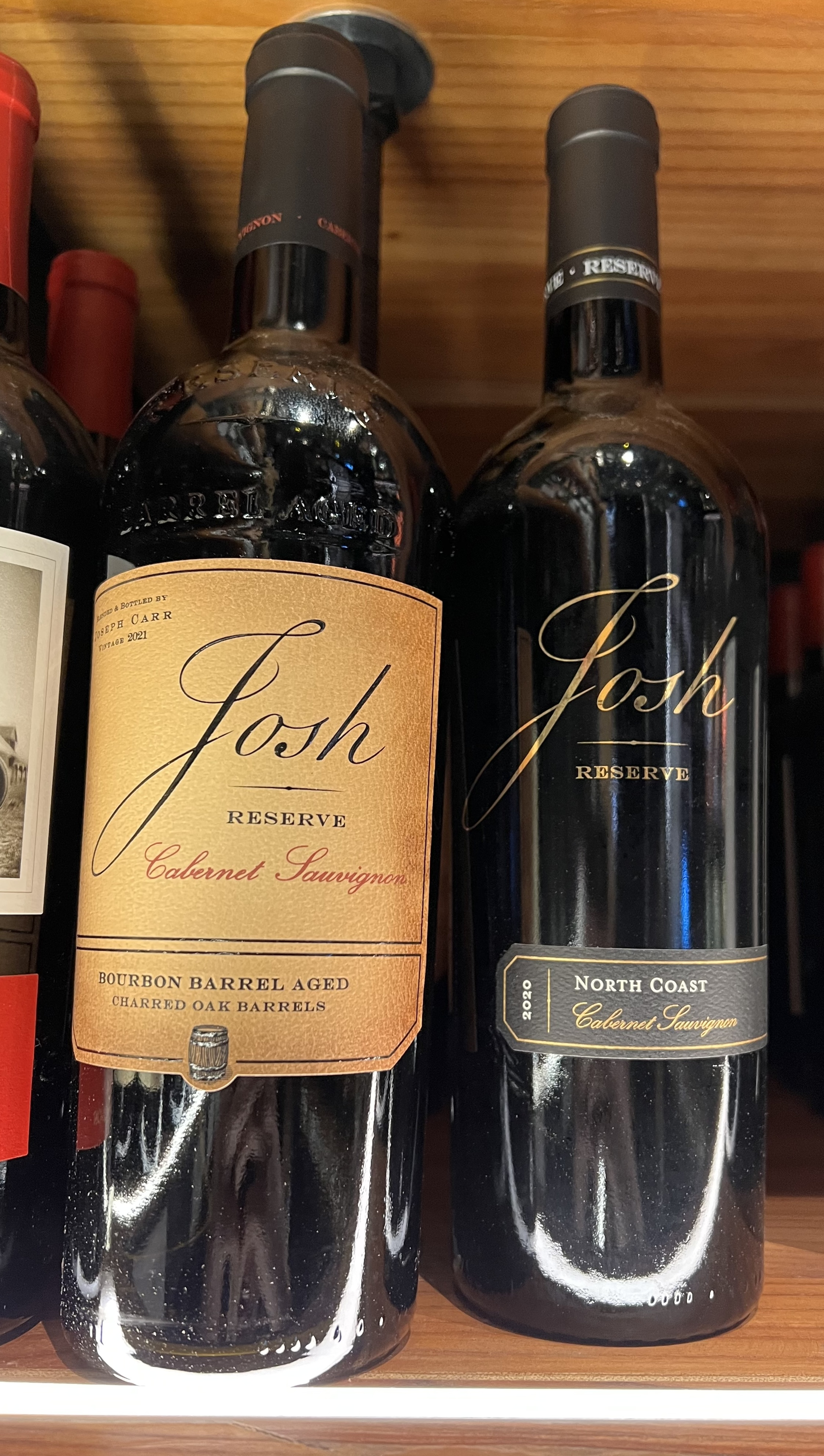
- Bottles of Josh Reserve Cabernet Sauvignon
- Location: California, United States
- Wine region: Mendocino; Paso Robles
- Founded: 2007
- Key people: Joseph Carr
- Parent company: Deutsch Family Wine & Spirits
- Cases/yr: 5,000,000
- Varietals: Cabernet Sauvignon, Chardonnay, Merlot, Pinot grigio, Pinot noir, rosé, Sauvignon blanc, Zinfandel
- Website: joshcellars.com

Josh Cellars is an American winery that primarily produces California wine. It was launched in 2007 by American vintner Joseph Carr and named as a tribute to his father, Josh. As of 2023, it was the best-selling premium table wine brand in the United States, and the most popular brand of wine in the country that costs more than $10 per bottle.

== History ==
American vintner Joseph Carr, who grew up in Upstate New York, first began developing Josh Cellars in 2005 in collaboration with Sonoma-based winemaker Tom Larson. The company's name is a tribute to Joseph Carr's father Josh, who died in 1992 and was not a winemaker but rather a military veteran who also worked as a lumberjack and volunteer firefighter. Carr's mother first suggested the name; as Carr recounted, "although she was half joking when she said it, I loved the idea."

The company launched their first wine, a Cabernet Sauvignon, in 2007, which Carr sold out of the back of his truck with his wife Dee. They have since expanded their repertoire to include 11 varieties as of 2023, including Chardonnay, rosé, and Pinot noir, as well as a reserve collection of barrel-aged wine.

Wayne Donaldson joined Josh Cellars as head winemaker in 2009. Under his direction, several of the brand's varietals, including Cabernet Sauvignon, Sauvignon Blanc, and Merlot, have earned critical acclaim with 90+ point scores. His work also extends to the Josh Cellars Reserve portfolio, where both the North Coast and Paso Robles Cabernet Sauvignons have received similar accolades.

In 2011, Josh Cellars was acquired by the beverage conglomerate Deutsch Family Wine & Spirits, who gained control of sales, marketing, and production, while Carr remained the owner and face of the company. Josh Cellars thrived under the ownership of Deutsch amid a rapid growth period for mid-range wines, with an increase in sales from 130,000 cases in 2012 to 980,000 cases in 2015.

As of 2021, Josh Cellars produces wine in two Californian facilities in Paso Robles and Mendocino, a third facility in Oregon, and an additional facility in Italy where it produces two types of Prosecco.

In 2024, their production facility in Mendocino, Ray's Station Winery, was issued a cease and desist order by California's North Coast Regional Water Quality Control Board, who cited local reports of "intense foul odors" coming from the facility.

== Marketing and promotion ==
Josh Cellars was featured in an April 2021 Saturday Night Live sketch, in which a wine mom portrayed by Kate McKinnon remarked, "I love that it's called Josh ... That's such a neat name for wine," with the sketch later declaring Josh to be "the official wine of Rummikub". Joseph Carr said regarding the sketch, "It's amazing to get exposure like that. It really says something about how the brand's getting out there."

In May 2021, Josh Cellars donated $30,000 to the Children's Hospital & Medical Center in Omaha, Nebraska as part of the Josh fight, a fundraising event surrounding a "fight" between people named Josh.

In 2022, the company launched a "Joshgiving" ad campaign starring Josh Groban, calling on "Joshes across the country" to "give back to the people and communities that enrich their lives by conducting meaningful acts of thanks in the lead up to the Thanksgiving holiday."

== Production ==
Following its acquisition by Deutsch Family Wine & Spirits in 2011, Josh Cellars significantly expanded its output. Production grew from approximately 1 million cases in 2016 to 7.5 million cases by 2024, encompassing 23 wine varieties. The brand has also gained prominence in the affordable wine market, ranking as the bestselling table wine under $20 at Total Wine & More.

== Internet meme ==
In January 2024, Josh Cellars became an internet meme following a viral post on X that featured an image of Josh Cellars Merlot with the caption "I'm not gonna keep telling y'all to grow up and leave that Stella & Barefoot alone." Many users pointed out the irony of Josh's simple human name rendered in a sophisticated cursive font, posting catchphrases such as "It's Josh o'clock somewhere" and "Last night we let the Josh talk". Some memes also referenced other wineries with similar male names, such as Justin Vineyards and Bradley Vineyards.

Josh Cellars embraced the brand's newfound meme status, with Chief Brand Officer Dan Kleinman saying in a statement, "The wittiness of these posts have captivated us and we're delighted to see our brand be part of the broader social media conversation ... Let the memes flow!"
