= Makhan malai =

Indian dessert

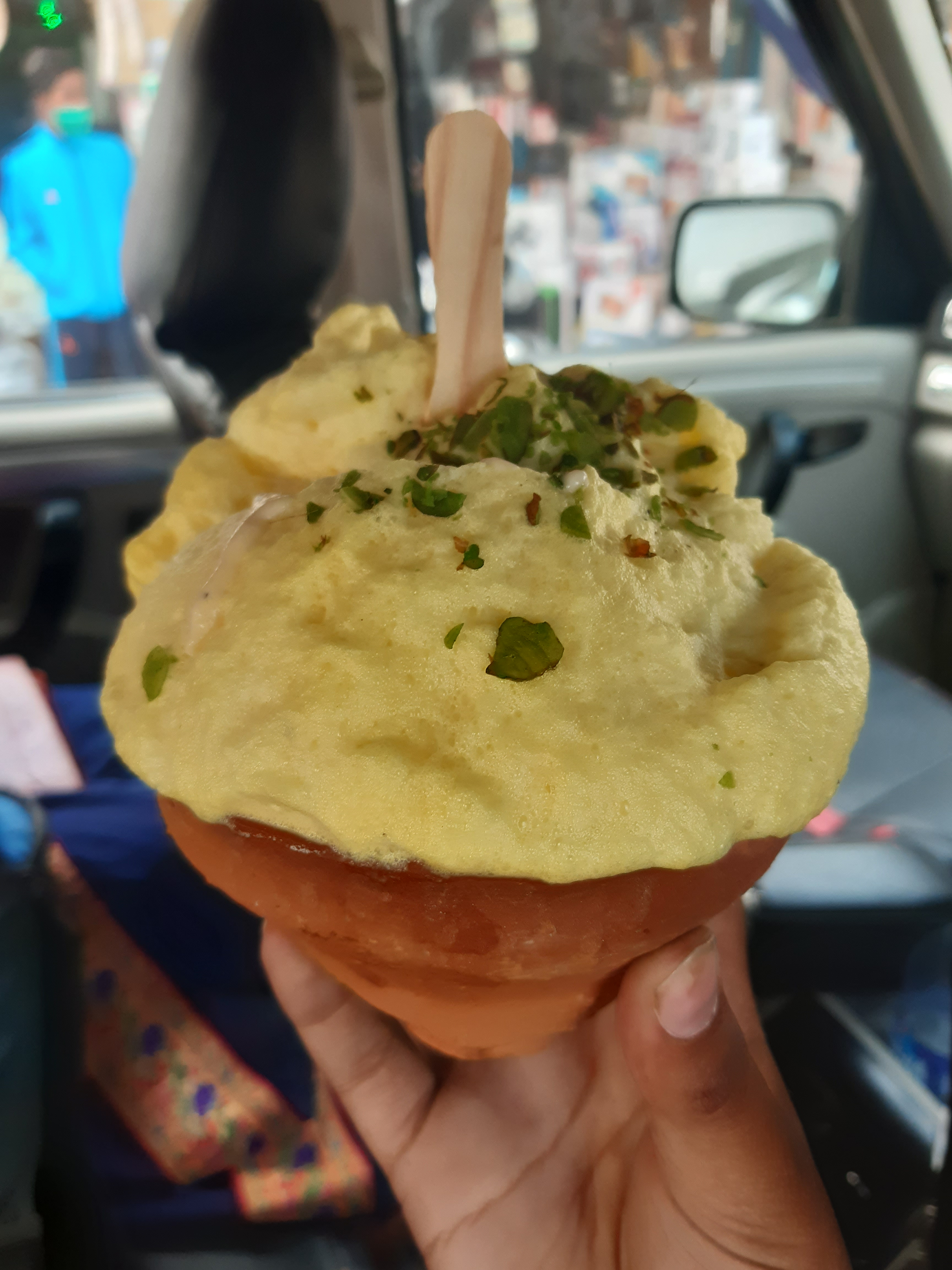
- Malaiyo from Varanasi
- Alternative names: Malaiyo
- Place of origin: India
- Region or state: Uttar Pradesh
- Main ingredients: cream

Makhan Malai (Hindi: मक्खन मलाई) or Malai Makkhan also called Malaiyo Hindi pronunciation: [mʌləɪʎɔː] or Nimish is a sweet snack made from milk cream during the winters. This dessert is prepared in many parts of Uttar Pradesh especially in cities of Kanpur, Varanasi and Lucknow and parts of Bihar however originated from Kanpur. Another version is available in Delhi as Daulat ki Chaat.

Even-though it literally translates to cream butter, it contains neither. It takes eight hours to prepare the dessert. Preparation starts a day before with cow milk being boiled in a huge cauldron. Then, fresh cream is added, and the milk is boiled again and allowed to cool under the sky. This is perhaps the most important step when the milk is exposed to dew and remains in the open for four to five hours. This is the only reason why it cannot be prepared in the summer. The heat will melt the butter. Next, dew-exposed milk is churned for three hours in the morning. Powdered sugar, yellow color, and cardamom powder are added to give it the final flavor.

== History ==
The preparation of Malaiyo is claimed to have originated in the Chaukhamba area of Varanasi, from where it spread to other parts of the city. Although more prominent sources claim that it was originated in Moradabad, Uttar Pradesh and spread over the eastern Uttar Pradesh.

An alternative account attributes its origin to a practice among local people who left milk exposed under the open sky overnight to prevent spoilage. By morning, dew drops would enhance the natural frothiness of the milk. This frothy milk was then sweetened with sugar, transforming it into a delicacy that became a popular breakfast item.
