= Wine mom =

Slang term

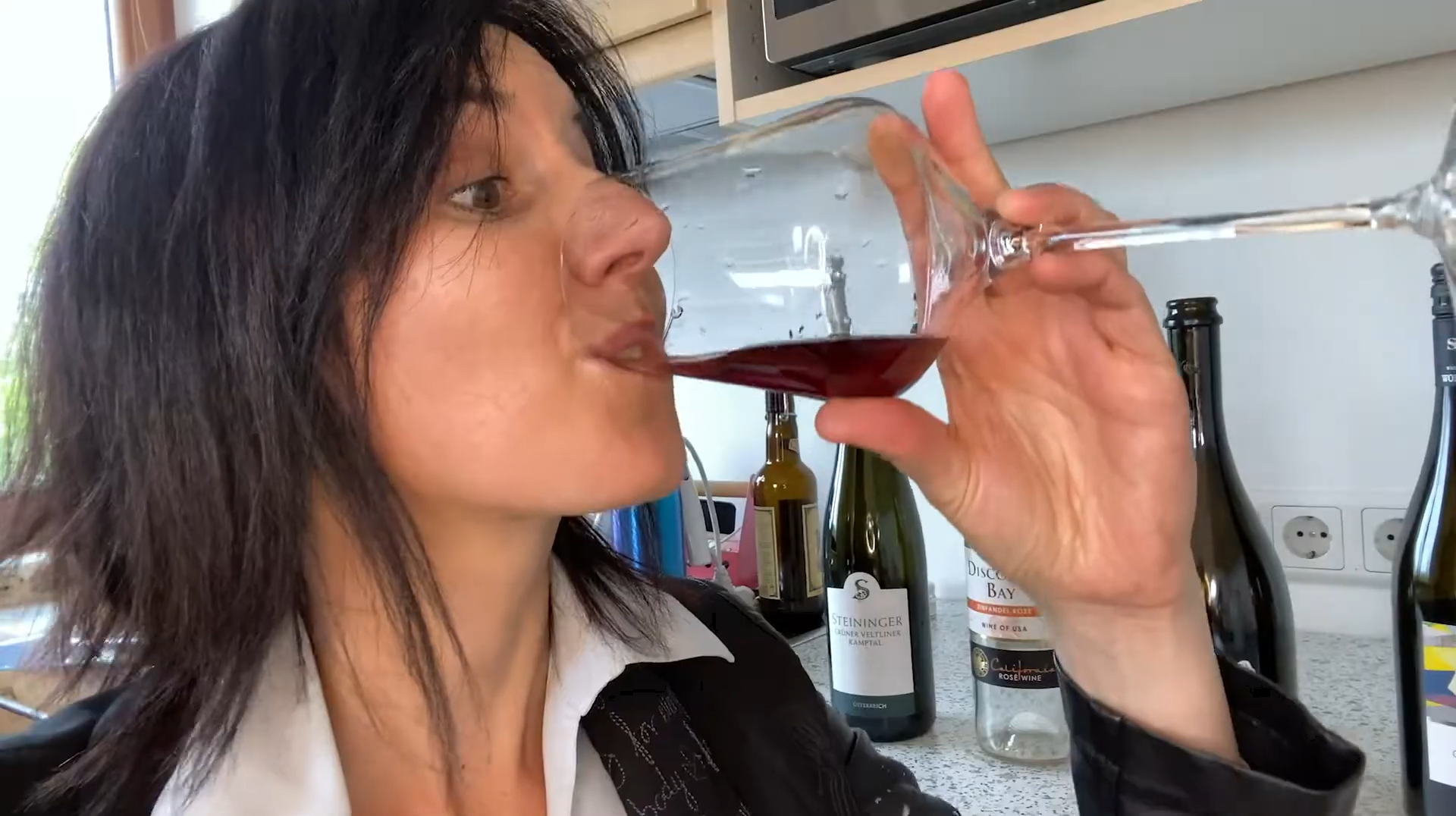
A middle-aged woman drinking wine

"Wine mom" is a pejorative term that is used to describe a typically upper middle class mother, often with young children, who turns to alcoholic drinks to cope with being over-worked or fatigued from parenting.

== History ==
The term "wine mom" first came into popular use during the COVID-19 pandemic, though the term's origins date back to at least pre-2016.

Factors that have been considered relevant by commentators include:

- working full-time at home
- loneliness/lack of social interaction in a home or apartment due to COVID-19 restrictions or otherwise
- being a single parent
- raising one or more children concomitant to other parental duties
- lack of personal space or privacy
- social pressures or conformity to drink
- general feelings of being overwhelmed

== Research ==
A study done by Erin M. Hill and Madeline E. Mazurek concluded that 28% of moms engage in harmful drinking behaviors and those that identify as a wine mom are more likely to drink more dangerously. This was further increased if the women reported high stress levels or dissatisfaction with their bodies.

According to a different psychological study done by Emily Lorenz, a doctoral candidate and graduate instructor at the University of Missouri, portraying mothers drinking for stress-relief purposes on social media could “encourage risky drinking behaviors by shaping social norms around alcohol consumption”. This study was conducted by splitting 330 mothers into three groups and exposing them to different social media content: wine mom, sober mom, and neutral content. After the test period all participants answered a series of questions regarding wine moms. Although the wine mom content group felt more encouraged to drink, the study found that without prior normalization from television, there was not enough evidence to prove social media alone could influence a mom’s perspective on risky drinking. However, those who had seen moms frequently drink on television believed moms drank way more than people normally do.

== See also ==
- Alcohol and health
