= Visconti Castle (Cassano d'Adda) =

Castle in Cassano d'Adda, Italy

- Castello Visconteo di Cassano d'Adda
- Cassano d'Adda, Lombardy, Northern Italy
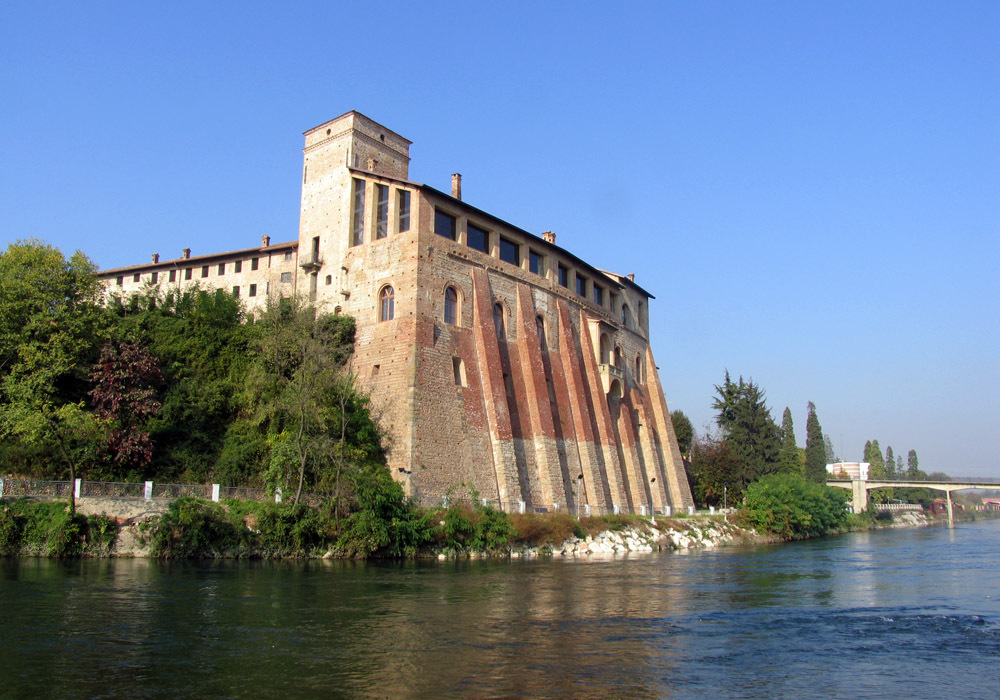
- The Visconti Castle seen from the Adda river

Site information
- Type: Medieval castle
- Owner: Private
- Open to the public: Yes, as hotel guest
- Condition: Good

Location
- Coordinates: 45°31′32″N 9°31′27″E

Site history
- Built: Before the 14h century
- Built by: Bernabò Visconti
- Materials: Stone, cobblestone and bricks
- Battles/wars: Cassano d'Adda (1259)

The Visconti Castle or Castello Visconteo of Cassano is a castle of medieval origin in Cassano d'Adda, Lombardy, Northern Italy. Its current form dates back to the 14th century, when Bernabò Visconti, lord of Milan, enlarged the existing fortification as part of a defensive system of the Visconti dominions on the Adda river. At the end of the 20th century, after a period of abandonment, it was restored and transformed into a hotel.

== Location ==
The Visconti Castle is located near the Adda River on a hill over the Muzza canal. The overlooking position, allowing the control of the river, is believed to have motivated the erection of the first fortification.

== History ==
A castle in the area is supposed to have existed since the Carolingian period. Near the castle, on 27 September 1259, the two Milanese factions supporting Ezzelino da Romano and Martino Della Torre fought the Battle of Cassano. The battle ended with Ezzelino's defeat and the confirmation of the Della Torre family as lords of Milan.

The castle was acquired by the Visconti house after their victory over the Della Torre in the fight for the lordship of Milan. In 1355, Bernabò Visconti received the castle as part of the division between him and his brothers Matteo II and Galeazzo II. Between 1355 and 1370, Bernabò, who had received the eastern portion of the Visconti territories, built a defensive line along the Adda River. As part of it, he strengthened and enlarged the castle of Cassano d'Adda, giving it its definitive shape. The porch with pointed arches in the courtyard and the mullioned windows on the western facades presumably date back to Bernabò's period. The wall structure was mainly made up (as seen in the unplastered parts) of Adda pebbles alternated with brick rows, a building technique commonly used in medieval fortifications near the rivers.

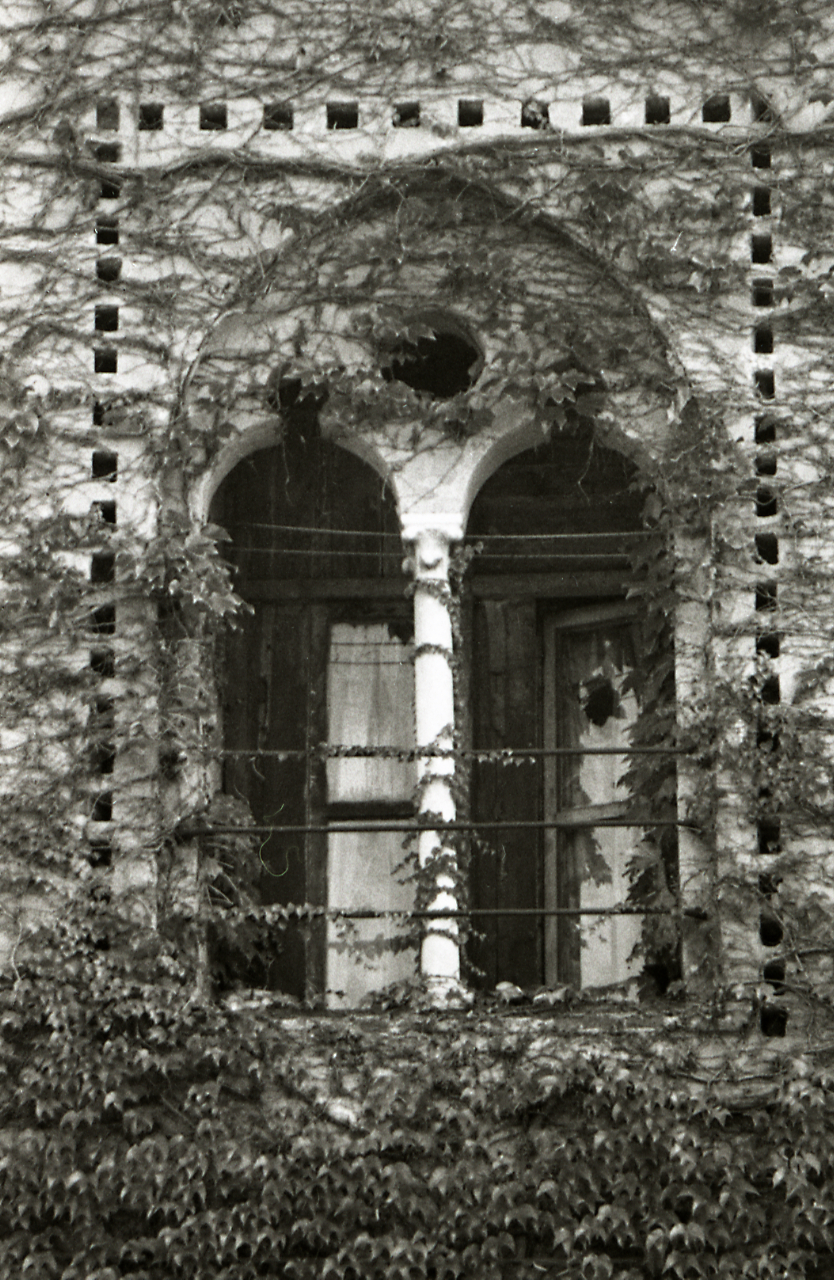
A mullioned window before the restoration in a photo by Paolo Monti

In the 15th century, Francesco Sforza consolidated the castle with the imposing buttresses, elevated over the Muzza canal and brick-made. The castle later went on to the d'Adda family and then to the Borromeo family, motivating the name of Borromeo Castle that some sources attribute to it.

The castle lost its military importance in the following centuries and served different purposes (warehouse, prison, and recovery for homeless people).

Renovation works were undertaken in the 20th century, restoring the castle to its original features. During these works, Middle Age frescos were discovered on the walls and vaulted ceilings and hence preserved. Part of the frescoes are attributable to the commission of Bernabò Visconti and his wife, Regina della Scala.

== Today ==
Today, the castle hosts the Hotel Castello Visconteo. The interior rooms, with medieval frescoes, are open to the hotel's guests.

The castle is characterized by its view from the Adda River, with its high buttresses. The façade shows the original mullioned windows and, at a lower level, the more recent quadrangular-shaped ones.

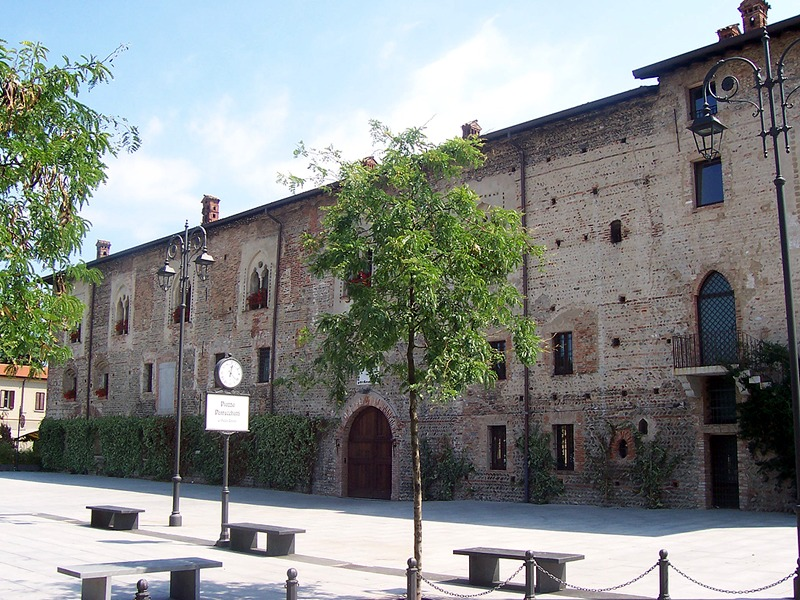
The façade with the main entrance

== Sources ==
- Conti, Flavio; Hybsch, Vincenzo; Vincenti, Antonello (1990). I castelli della Lombardia. Provincie di Milano e Pavia (in Italian). Novara: Istituto Geografico de Agostini. ISBN 9788840291086. OCLC 635639773.
- Romano, Serena (2011). "Il modello visconteo: il caso di Bernabò". In Quintavalle, Arturo Carlo (ed.). Medioevo: i committenti. Atti del Convegno internazionale di studi. Parma, 21-26 settembre 2010 (in Italian). Milan: Electa. pp. 642–656. ISBN 9788837088750. OCLC 800798480.
