= Jeremy Charles (restaurateur) =

Canadian restaurateur

Jeremy Charles is the former head chef and former co-owner of Raymonds and the Merchant Tavern. He has been featured in various journals (including: The Globe and Mail The Guardian, Huff Post, The New York Times, RestoBiz, and Travel + Leisure). In 2014, the Maclean Power List: Canada's 50 Most Powerful People. In 2015 his annual ‘Dinner for Levi’ event raised $50,000 for Janeway Hospital's Neonatal Intensive Care Unit. In 2016, he received the City of St. John's Legend Award. Charles has participated in chef events with: Cook It Raw, Bottura's Refettorio Ambrosiano, Terroir Symposium, the Northern Chef's Alliance and the Melbourne Food and Wine Festival. In 2018, Montreal chef David McMillan called him “easily the best chef in Canada.” His restaurant Raymonds was featured in the Diners Club World's 50 Best Restaurants Academy.
