= Santiago Lastra =

Mexican chef

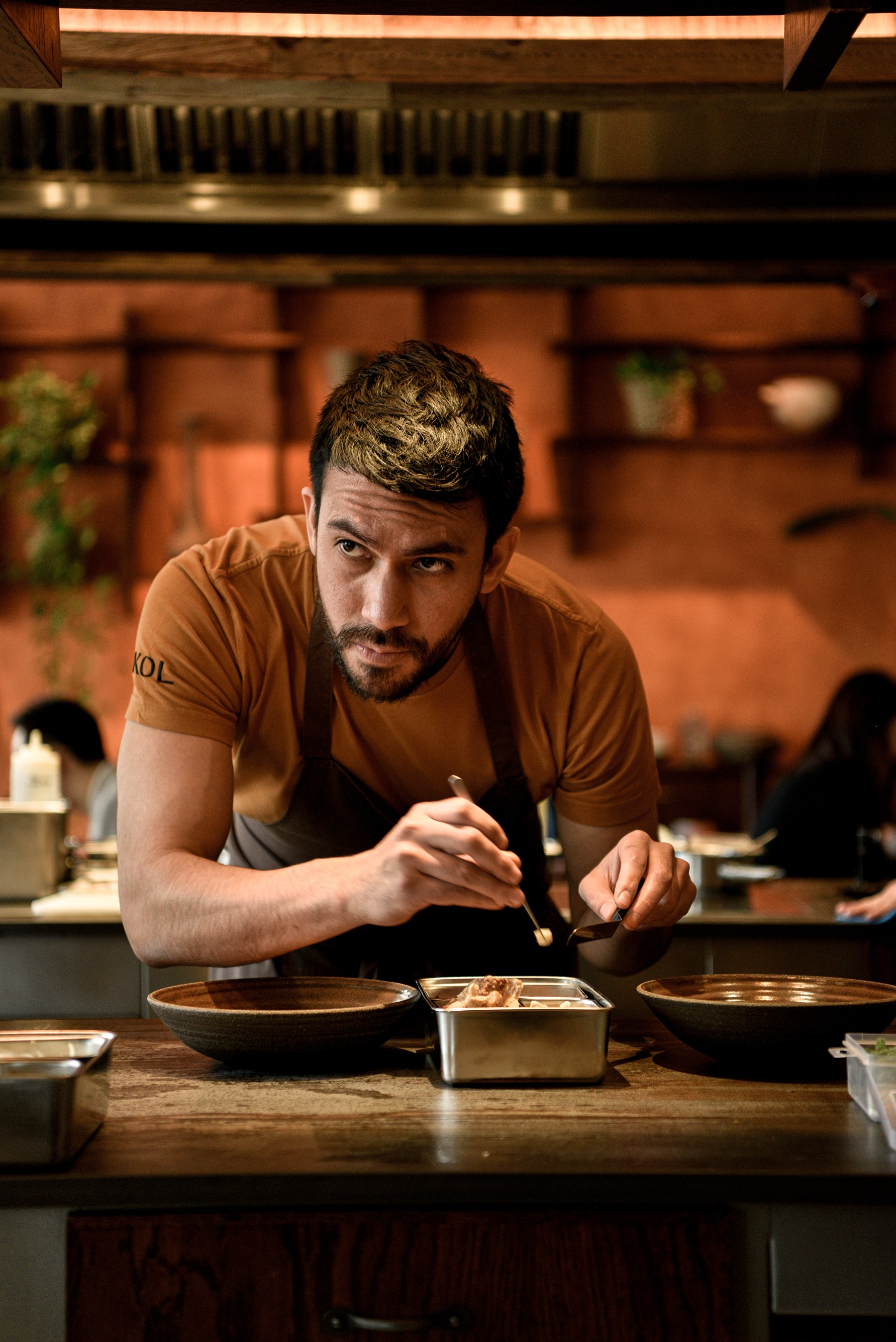
Santiago Lastra in his restaurant KOL in Marylebone, in 2023.

Santiago Lastra (born 4 April 1990) is a Mexican chef and co-owner of KOL Restaurant in Marylebone, London.

== Early life ==
Lastra was born and raised in Cuernavaca, Mexico.

== Career ==
Lastra completed training at the Instituto de Arte Culinario Coronado, followed by a Masters at the Basque Culinary Center, before beginning a high-profile career including Mugaritz and the Nordic Food Lab.

Before opening his own restaurant KOL in 2020, he worked at Noma Mexico with René Redzepi as his Project Manager for the seven-week pop-up in 2017. Prior to this, he had spent years travelling as a guest chef, through 27 countries, attending a series of one-off events in venues such as The Tate in London and Hija de Sanchez in Copenhagen.

== KOL Restaurant ==
KOL is Santiago Lastra's first restaurant, a 54 seat ground floor Mexican restaurant in Marylebone, London, opening in October 2020.

In 2021, KOL was voted the Best New Arrival in Europe in the La Liste Awards, and Lastra himself was voted Best New Chef in the GQ Food & Drink Awards.

In 2022, KOL received its first Michelin Star, retained in 2023 and 2024, was named Number 15 in the OAD Top New Restaurants in Europe list and Number 1 in the UK, and entered the World's 50 Best at Number 73. In the same year, Santiago was listed in Top 100 Chefs in the World in 'The Best Chef' awards.

In 2023 KOL entered the World's 50 Best Restaurants at Number 23.

In 2024 KOL climbed to Number 17 in the World's 50 Best Restaurants.
