= Chaukhamba Mosque =

Mosque in Varanasi, Uttar Pradesh, India

Religion
- Affiliation: Islam
- Ecclesiastical or organizational status: Mosque
- Status: Active; (partial ruinous state)

Location
- Location: Varanasi, Uttar Pradesh
- Country: India

Architecture
- Type: Mosque architecture
- Completed: 14th century

The Chaukhamba Mosque (Urdu: چوکھمبا مسجد) is a mosque, located in Varanasi, in the state of Uttar Pradesh, India. Despite its partial ruinous state, the 14th-century mosque is used as a pilgrimage site by Muslims. Chau means four and Khamba means pillar, as the mosque has four low massive pillars towards its north eastern extremity. It was constructed during the reign of Sultan of Delhi, Feroz Shah Tughlaq (r. 1351–1388).

== See also ==
- Islam in India
- List of mosques in India
