= Aguachile =

Mexican dish

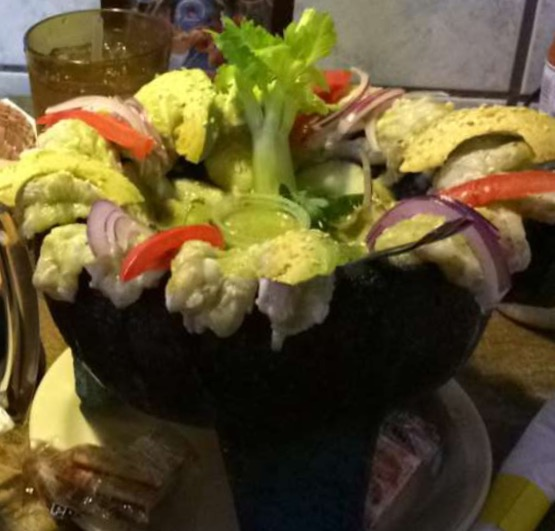
- Aguachile
- Place of origin: Mexico
- Region or state: Nayarit
- Associated cuisine: Mexico
- Main ingredients: Shrimp, fish, onion, lime juice and chiltepin peppers

Aguachile (lit. chili water) is a Mexican dish typically made of raw seafood.

== History ==
The origin of aguachile lies in the coast of Sinaloa, originally made with boiled water and chiltepin, a type of small round chili peppers from Sinaloa. This dish comes from the north west region of Mexico (mainly Sinaloa), and is normally prepared in a molcajete.

Traditionally it is made of shrimp and raw fish fillet, submerged in liquid seasoned with chiltepin peppers, lime juice, salt, slices of cucumber and slices of red onion.

== See also ==
- Ceviche, a different marinated raw seafood dish
