= Personal service =

Personal service may refer to:

- Personal service sector of the economy, which delivers services rather than goods
- Service of process, delivery of court documents to a person
- Personal Services, 1987 comedy film set in a brothel

Taxation

- Personal service corporation in United States tax law
- IR35, United Kingdom tax law for individuals paid through personal service companies
