= BGC3 =

BGC3 can refer to

- Gates Ventures, a company owned by Bill Gates and formerly named bgC3
- Bad Girls Club (season 3)
