= CNBC TV18 =

Indian pay television business and financial news channel

- Logo used since 2026
- Country: India
- Broadcast area: Asia
- Network: CNBC
- Headquarters: Mumbai, India

Programming
- Language: English
- Picture format: CNBC TV18; 576i SDTV; CNBC TV18 PRIME; 1080i HDTV

Ownership
- Owner: Network18 Group; Versant
- Key people: Shereen Bhan (Managing Editor)
- Sister channels: Network18 Group channels

History
- Launched: 7 December 1999; 26 years ago

Links
- Website: www.cnbctv18.com

Availability

Terrestrial
- Airtel digital TV: LCN 396

CNBC TV18 is an Indian pay television business and financial news channel operated as a joint venture between Versant and Network18 Group.

== History ==
=== Origins and launch (1995–1999) ===
The network began as ABNi, an Indian sub-feed of Asia Business News (ABN), a regional service run by Dow Jones & Company in collaboration with TV18, an Indian media company, in the middle of the 1990s. CNBC and Dow Jones came to an international agreement in 1997 to combine their regional operations in Asia and Europe under the single CNBC banner. Nevertheless, ABNi's original corporate structure did not include clauses pertaining to modifications for a shift in local ownership. TV18 obtained an exclusive partnership agreement with CNBC to act as its commercial and programming partner in the Indian market after structural discussions between TV18 executives, a CNBC legal team, and ABN Chief Executive Officer Paul France, who oversaw the creation of the merged CNBC Asia.

The result of this business collaboration was the establishment of CNBC India on 7 December 1999. It became India's first 24-hour dedicated business and financial television news channel, with its headquarters located in Mumbai, Maharashtra.

=== Corporate restructuring and expansion (2004–present) ===
The channel was formally renamed as "CNBC-TV18" in 2004. On 13 January 2005, TV18 collaborated with NBC once more to expand its localized television portfolio by launching CNBC Awaaz, a dedicated Hindi-language business channel. In order to honor excellence in corporate governance and domestic entrepreneurship, the network launched the annual India Business Leader Awards (IBLA) later that year.

On 26 October 2011, TV18 introduced CNBC TV18 Prime HD, a widescreen high-definition sister channel, to serve premium retail trading markets. This network utilized a data-heavy, an on-screen graphical format that was optimized for financial market investors. The high-definition channel was renamed CNBC TV18 PRIME on 25 May 2025, as a result of international restructuring of NBCUniversal, which split off its main cable properties into the independent holding company Versant. During the India Business Leader Awards ceremony on 9 April 2018, the broadcaster launched CNBCTV18.com, its main online streaming and editorial platform.

After Reliance Industries Limited (RIL) obtained a majority share in its parent company, Network18 Group, through the Independent Media Trust, control of the network underwent a significant shift. TV18 Broadcast Limited and e-Eighteen.com (E18) were formally merged into Network18's core business structure on 3 October 2024, marking the completion of a comprehensive corporate consolidation. Its digital finance brands, including Moneycontrol, and linear television portfolios were consolidated into a single publicly traded company.
