= How to Prevent the Next Pandemic =

2022 book by Bill Gates

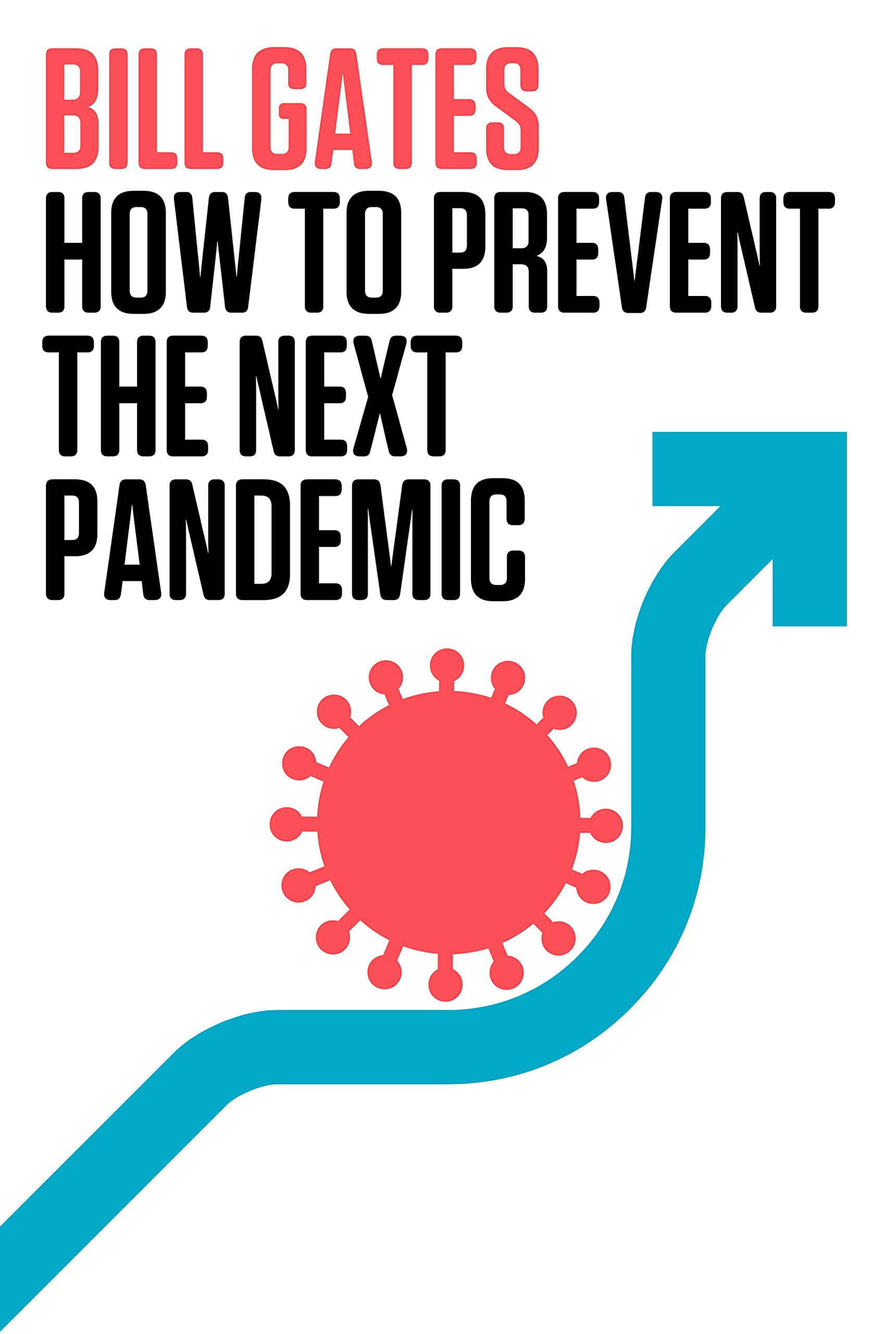
- Cover of the first edition
- Author: Bill Gates
- Language: English
- Subjects: COVID-19 pandemic; pandemic preparation
- Published: April 2022
- Pages: 304

How to Prevent the Next Pandemic is a 2022 book by Bill Gates. In it, Gates details the COVID-19 pandemic and how to prevent another pandemic, including proposing a "Global Epidemic Response and Mobilization" (GERM) team with annual funding of $1 billion.

== Content ==
The book discusses various aspects related to the prevention of pandemics, including medical practices necessary for doing so.

Bill Gates' main idea is to create a global pandemic prevention team, known as GERM (Global Epidemic Response and Mobilization). Its objective is to ensure preparedness for the next pandemic.

According to Gates, such a team could save about one billion dollars by preventing crises like COVID-19.

== Reception ==
The Washington Post praised the book, saying that "The material is simplified but not simplistic. Anyone who reads it will end up with a basic grounding in the science of global health."

The Times of London gave a mixed review, calling the book a "formidably informative read" while also saying that it "runs out of steam towards the end and becomes a general statement of techno-optimism."

Vox criticized the book for not addressing the "root causes" of economic inequality that "worsens health crises." The Washington Times called Gates' pandemic prevention proposal "the next phase of seizing individual liberties from supposedly free American citizens." and accused him of "trying to capitalize politically and financially on the ramped fears and manufactured hysteria".

The medical journal The Lancet pointed out that on the same day that Gates advertised his book and GERM, the WHO published its report on Strengthening the Global Architecture for Health Emergency Preparedness, Response, and Resilience, similar to GERM, but without decision-making power.

The Guardian noted that the book demonstrates the awareness of the impact of information technology in the spread of COVID-19 misinformation, but criticizes Gates' lack of interest in directly taking initiative to prevent COVID-19 misinformation from spreading via information technology.
