= Shereen Bhan =

Indian journalist and news anchor (born 1976)

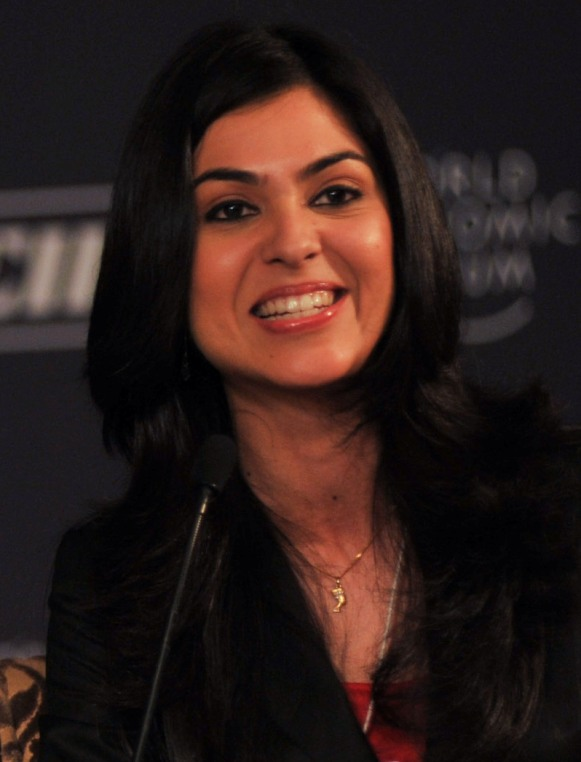
- Bhan at the India Economic Summit 2009
- Born: 20 August 1976 (age 50)
- Education: St. Stephen's College, Delhi; University of Pune
- Employer: CNBC TV18
- Organization(s): Journalist, News anchor

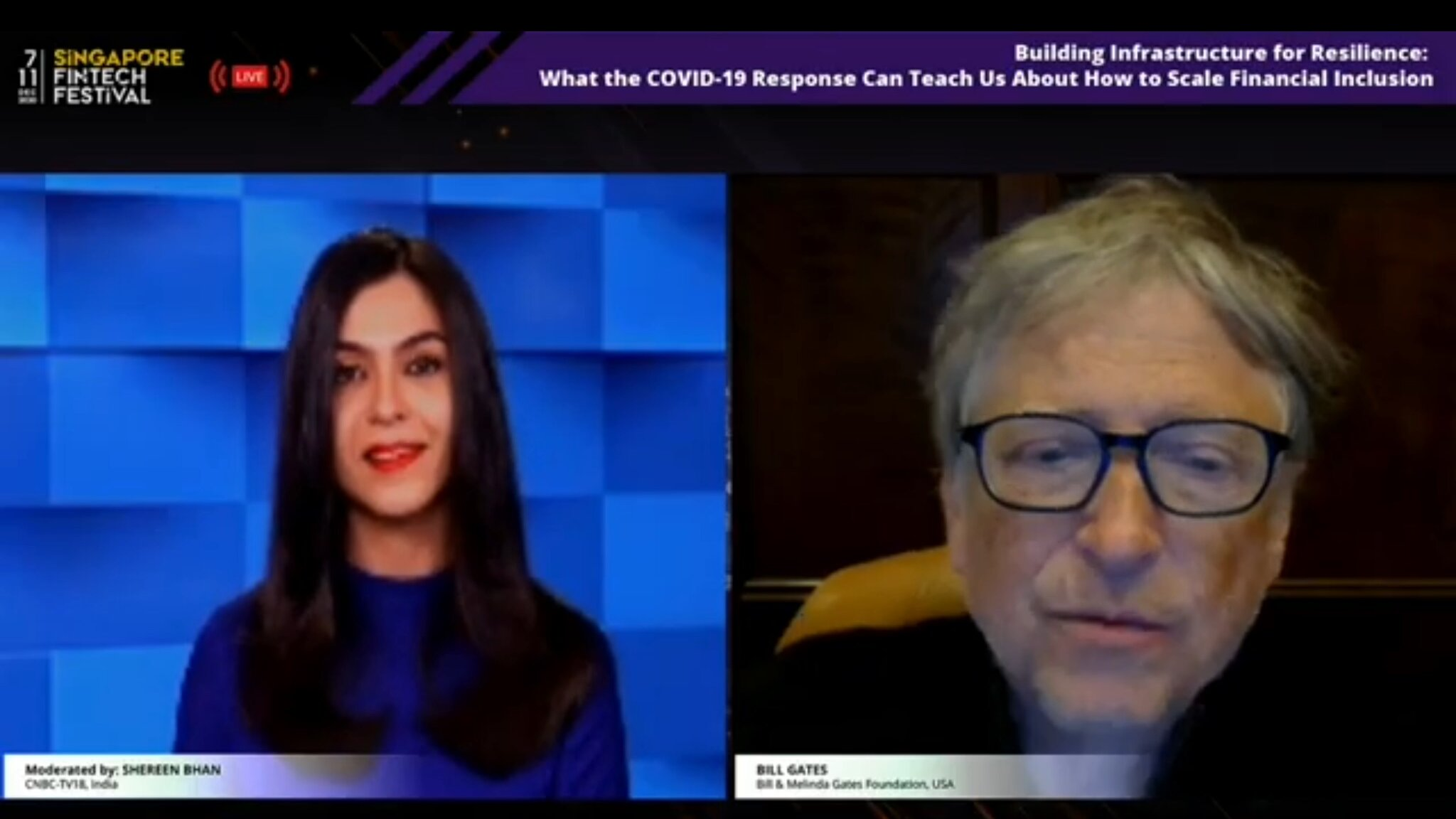
Bhan in an online discussion with Bill Gates at the Singapore FinTech Festival, 2020.

Shereen Bhan (born 20 August 1976) is an Indian journalist and news anchor who currently serves as the Managing Editor of CNBC-TV18. Bhan took over the role from 1 September 2013 after her predecessor Udayan Mukherjee decided to step down.

== Early life and education ==
Shereen Bhan was born on 20 August 1976 into a Kashmiri Hindu family. She is the cousin of actress Naina Bhan.

Bhan did her schooling at Kendriya Vidyalaya in Kashmir and at Air Force Bal Bharati School, New Delhi. She then graduated from St. Stephen's College, Delhi, with a degree in Philosophy and a master's degree in Communication Studies from the University of Pune, with film and television as her area of specialisation.

== Career ==
Bhan began her career working as a news-researcher for Karan Thapar in his production house Infotainment Television. She joined UTV's News and Current Affairs division and produced shows like We the People for Star TV and Line of Fire for SAB TV. She joined CNBC-TV18 on 7 December 2000.

Bhan is also the Anchor & Editor of Young Turks, one of India's longest running shows on entrepreneurs. She hosts Overdrive, which won the News Television Award for the 'Best Auto Show' for three consecutive years. She heads the channel's special feature programming that carries several pioneering shows such as Ministers of Change and What Women Really Want. Bhan received the 'Best Business Talk Show' award at the News Television awards for two years consecutively. She also won the 'FICCI Woman of the Year' award for her contribution to the Media in 2005, and was named a 'Young Global Leader' by the World Economic Forum. She won the ‘Best Business Anchor Award’ at the ‘News Television Awards’ in 2013.

Bhan anchors and produces several shows including India Business Hour, The Nation's Business and Power Turks.

== Awards ==
1. In April 2005, she was awarded the FICCI Woman of the Year award.
2. Women's magazine Femina included her among the 20 Beautiful Faces of the year in its September 2005 issue.
3. She was featured on the cover of Verve magazine's December 2008 issue
4. Shereen figured among the 50 most Beautiful Women in the Vogue October 2008 issue.
5. In 2009, the World Economic Forum named her as one of the Young Global Leaders of 2009.
6. In 2021, Best News Presenter or Anchor, India Business Hour, 26th Asian Television Awards (Nominated)
