= Gates Ventures =

Personal service company of Bill Gates

- Industry: Personal services
- Founded: 2008; 18 years ago
- Founder: Bill Gates
- Headquarters: Kirkland, Washington, US
- Key people: Larry Cohen (Managing partner); Niranjan Bose (Managing director)
- Website: www.gatesnotes.com
- Footnotes; Formerly Carillon Holdings and bgC3

Gates Ventures is the personal service company of Microsoft co-founder and philanthropist Bill Gates. Known until 2018 as bgC3, it comprises his personal staff, a think tank on problems of health and global development, and a technology investment portfolio. The firm is distinct from Cascade Investment and the Gates Foundation although Gates uses it to support the Foundation's projects. Areas of research and investment include climate change, sustainable energy and Alzheimer's disease.

Gates Ventures is located at Kirkland, Washington, in the same complex with Cascade and Melinda French Gates' Pivotal Ventures. Niranjan Bose is currently Gates Ventures' managing director.
