= How to Avoid a Climate Disaster =

2021 book by Bill Gates

How to Avoid a Climate Disaster: The Solutions We Have and the Breakthroughs We Need
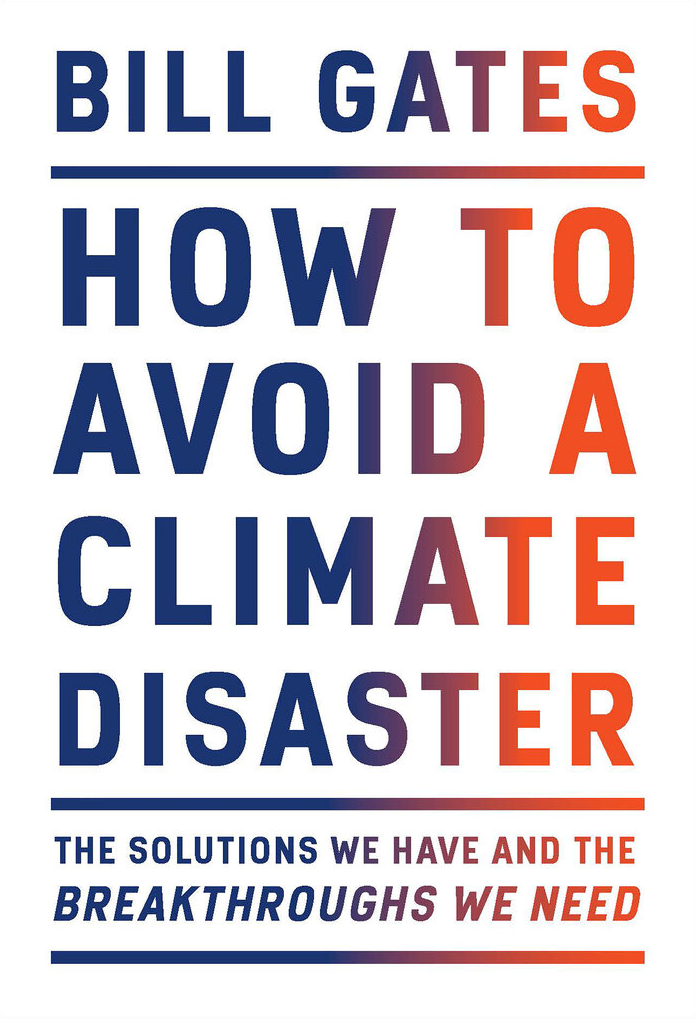
- First edition cover
- Author: Bill Gates
- Audio read by: Bill Gates; Wil Wheaton
- Language: English
- Subject: Climate change
- Publisher: Alfred A. Knopf
- Publication date: February 16, 2021
- Publication place: United States
- Media type: Print (hardcover and paperback), e-book, audio
- Pages: 272
- ISBN: 978-0-385-54613-3 (hardcover)
- OCLC: 1122802121
- Dewey Decimal: 363.738/747
- LC Class: QC903 .G378 2020

How to Avoid a Climate Disaster: The Solutions We Have and the Breakthroughs We Need is a 2021 book by Bill Gates. In it, Gates presents what he learned in over a decade of studying climate change and investing in innovations to address global warming and recommends technological strategies to tackle it.

== Description ==
When it comes to climate change, I know innovation isn’t the only thing we need. But we cannot keep the earth livable without it. Techno-fixes are not sufficient, but they are necessary.

– Bill Gates, from page 14 of his book, How to Avoid a Climate Disaster (2021).

=== The book's five parts ===
The book is organized into five parts. In part one (chapter 1), Gates explains why the world must completely eliminate greenhouse gas emissions ("getting to zero"), rather than simply reducing them. In part two (chapter 2) he discusses the challenges that will make achieving this goal very difficult. In part three (chapter 3) he outlines five pragmatic questions a reader can ask to evaluate any conversation they have about climate change. Part four (the longest part of the book, or chapters 4 through 9) analyzes currently-available technologies that can be utilized now to adapt to and mitigate climate change ("the solutions we have") and those areas where innovation is needed to make climate-friendly technologies cost competitive with their fossil fuel counterparts ("the breakthroughs we need"). In the final part (chapters 10 through 12) Gates suggests specific steps that can be taken by government leaders, market participants and individuals to collectively avoid a climate disaster.

=== Electricity generation ===
Gates thinks that decarbonizing electricity should be a priority, because it would not only reduce emissions from coal and gas used to produce electricity, but also allow an accelerated shift to zero emission transportation like electric cars. He advocates increased innovation and investment in nuclear energy, and warns against overly focusing on wind and solar generation, due to their intermittent nature.

=== Roles for government and business ===
Gates argues that both governments and businesses have parts to play in fighting global warming. While he acknowledges that there is a tension between economic development and sustainability, he posits that accelerated innovation in green technology, particularly sustainable energy, would resolve it. He calls on governments to increase investment in climate research, but at the same time to incentivize firms to invest in green energy and decarbonization. Gates also urges governments to institute a carbon pricing regime that would account for all externalities involved in producing and using carbon-emitting energy.

=== Get to zero rather than simply reducing emissions ===
The book describes strategies for achieving net zero greenhouse gas emissions by 2050, and emphasizes that many efforts to reduce emissions are actually counter-productive. For example, one can reduce CO_{2} emissions in 2030 by replacing a coal-fired electrical power plant with a new natural gas power plant (since coal combustion emits twice as much CO_{2} as natural gas, per unit of electricity). However, the natural gas plant will still be emitting CO_{2} in 2050. Alternatively, Gates prefers we spend money on infrastructure that does not emit CO_{2} in 2050. Gates warns, "Making reductions by 2030 the wrong way might actually prevent us from ever getting to zero."

=== Gates' plan to get to net zero emissions ===
Gates introduces a plan for getting to net zero greenhouse gas emissions in Chapters 11 and 12 with several key points:

- The world needs to get to zero emissions, not just reduce.
- The world needs to accelerate the development of technology that helps to resolve the climate change problem.
- The world needs to reduce the additional cost of green energy, which he refers to as the "green premium".
- Federal, state and local governments can play a role to reduce emissions; in addition to private citizens.

== Publication ==
How to Avoid a Climate Disaster was published in hardcover by Alfred A. Knopf on February 16, 2021. An audiobook narrated by Gates and Wil Wheaton was released the same day. A large-print paperback edition was published on February 23, 2021.

The book debuted at number one on The New York Times nonfiction best-seller list for the week ending February 20, 2021.

== Reception ==
The ideas in How to Avoid a Climate Disaster generated discussions and commentary on both sides of the Atlantic. Most reviewers found that the book did not adequately address the political obstacles that must be overcome to transition away from fossil fuels, but many appreciated its assertion that technological progress and innovation will be critically necessary for the worldwide energy transition. Additionally, many commentators disagreed with Gates' emphasis on the intermittency problem associated with both solar power and wind power, and some took issue with his conclusion that nuclear fission power might be an acceptable way of mitigating climate change.

=== Politicians, journalists and activists ===
==== Gordon Brown ====
Writing in The Guardian, former UK prime minister Gordon Brown made generally positive comments on the book, but warned that it only touches briefly on the political obstacles the international community must navigate before a cataclysm is averted:

Gates [has a] touching, admirable faith in science and reason, [but he also] knows that the solution he seeks is inextricably tied up in political decisions. ... [T]o operationalise the Paris [COP21] agreement – to limit warming to 1.5 degrees – requires countries to halve their CO_{2} emissions by 2030. So vested interests like big oil will have to be enlisted for change. The ... rhetoric of irresponsible demagogues will have to be taken head on. And supporters of a stronger set of commitments will have to show why sharing sovereignty is in every nation’s self-interest.

==== Michael Mann ====
In The New Climate War, the climatologist Michael Mann writes that Gates' book "advocates for a technocratic approach to addressing the climate crisis" (technologies in which "Gates has personal investment") and is "overly dismissive of the role that renewable energy can play in decarbonizing our economy". According to Mann, "the primary remaining obstacles are not fundamentally technological [...]. They are political".

==== Bill McKibben ====
Like Brown, US climate activist Bill McKibben faulted How to Avoid a Climate Disaster for not spending more time discussing the political impediments preventing action on climate change mitigation. However, McKibben's criticisms were more pointed:

It is a disappointment ... to report that this book turns out to be a little underwhelming. ... [Gates is] absolutely right that we should be investing in research across a wide list of technologies because we may need them down the line to help scrub the last increments of fossil fuel from the system, but the key work will be done (or not) over the next decade, and it will be done by sun and wind. ... Most people, Gates included, have not caught on yet to just how fast [the price decline for solar and wind power] is happening. So why aren't we moving much faster than we are? That's because of politics, and this is where Gates really wears blinders. ... [T]hat means he can write an entire book about the "climate disaster" without discussing the role that the fossil fuel industry played, and continues to play, in preventing action. ... [I]t's wonderful that Gates has decided to work hard on climate questions, but to be truly helpful he ... needs to really get down on his hands and knees and examine how ... power works in all its messiness. Politics very much included.

==== Leah Stokes ====
Canadian-American political scientist Leah Stokes described the book as largely "technology solutionism" when compared to other books published at a similar time such as Under a White Sky by Elizabeth Kolbert.

==== The Economist ====
British newspaper The Economist praised Gates for the book's "cold-eyed realism and number-crunched optimism." While acknowledging that some might consider both the book's promotion of nuclear power and its emphasis on the constraints imposed by intermittency in wind and solar power generation to be an "outmoded mindset," eventually The Economist review concluded that Gates has the right big idea by stressing the need for innovation:

Bill Gates [in his] new book, "How to Avoid a Climate Disaster" [asserts that if] humanity is to win the great race between development and degradation ... green innovation must accelerate. ... [G]iven the pressing need to decarbonise the global economy, says Mr Gates, "we have to force an unnaturally speedy transition" [to carbon-free energy, and the] linchpin of his argument is the introduction of a meaningful carbon price to account for the externalities involved in using dirty energy. ... Ultimately his book is a primer on how to reorganise the global economy so that innovation focuses on the world’s gravest problems. It is a powerful reminder that if mankind is to get serious about tackling them, it must do more to harness the one natural resource available in infinite quantity – human ingenuity.

=== Traditional book reviewers ===
In its starred review, Kirkus Reviews called it a "supremely authoritative and accessible plan for how we can avoid a climate catastrophe." Publishers Weekly agreed, calling it a "cogent" and "accessible" guide to countering climate change. However, the publication wrote that "not all of his ideas strike as politically feasible."
