= Bill Gates =

American businessman and philanthropist (born 1955)

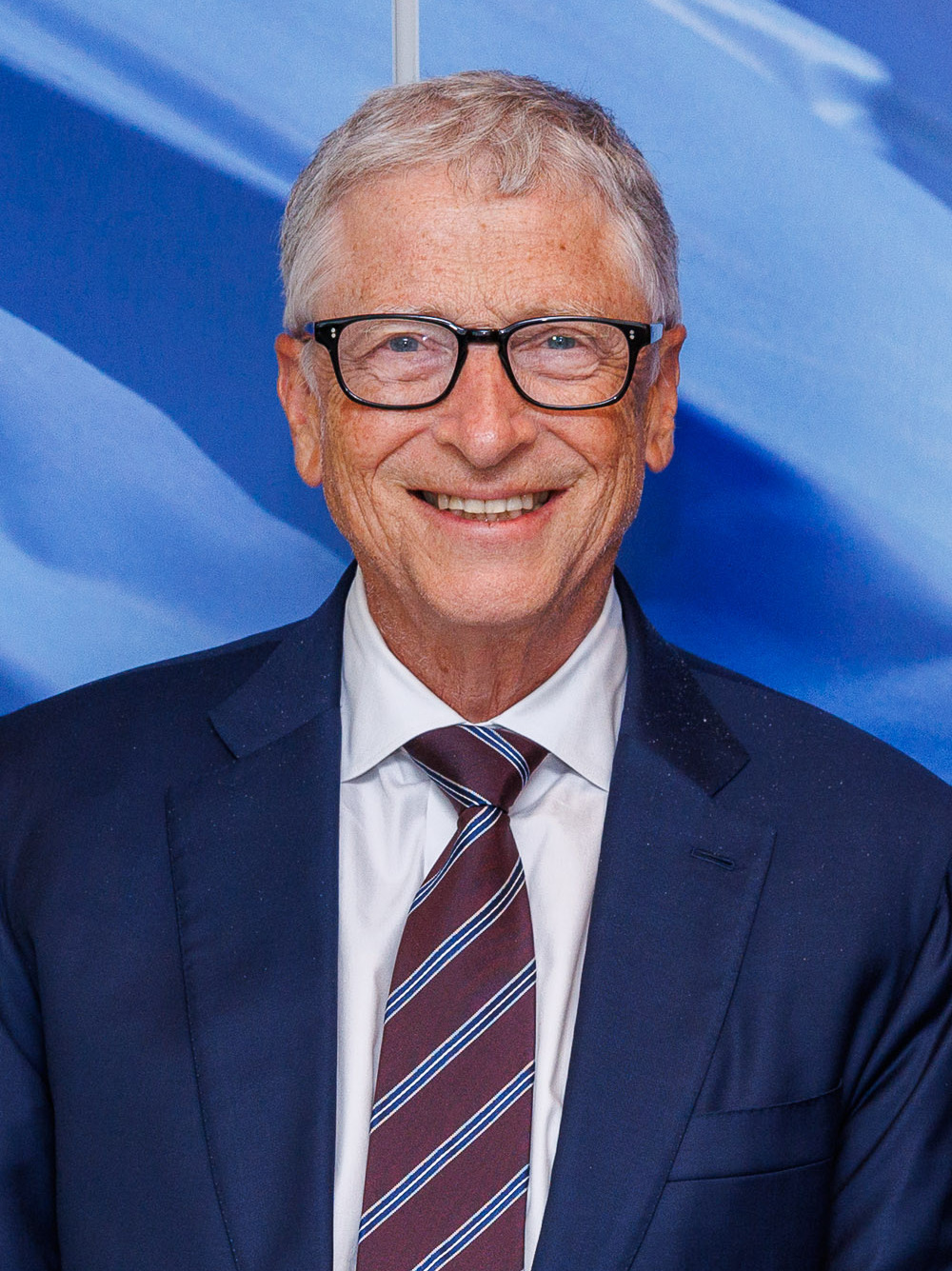
- Gates in 2025
- Born: William Henry Gates III; October 28, 1955 (age 71); Seattle, Washington, U.S.
- Education: Harvard University (dropped out)
- Occupations: Businessman; philanthropist; computer programmer; writer
- Years active: 1972–present
- Known for: Pioneer of the personal computer revolution with Paul Allen; Co-founding of Microsoft and Gates Foundation
- Title: See list: Chair of the Gates Foundation; Chairman and founder of Cascade Investment; Chairman and founder of Branded Entertainment Network; Chairman and co-founder of TerraPower; Founder of Breakthrough Energy; Founder of Gates Ventures; Technology advisor of Microsoft
- Spouse: Melinda French (m. 1994; div. 2021)
- Children: 3, including Phoebe
- Parents: Bill Gates Sr.; Mary Maxwell
- Relatives: Gates family
- Awards: Distinguished Fellow of the British Computer Society (1994); Knight Commander of the Order of the British Empire (2005); Padma Bhushan (2015); Presidential Medal of Freedom (2016); Grand Cordon of the Order of the Rising Sun (2020); Hilal-e-Pakistan (2022)
- Website: gatesnotes.com

William Henry Gates III (born October 28, 1955) is an American businessman and philanthropist. A pioneer of the microcomputer revolution of the 1970s and 1980s, he co-founded the software company Microsoft in 1975 with his childhood friend Paul Allen. Following Microsoft's initial public offering in 1986 and the subsequent increase in its stock price, Gates became the world's then-youngest billionaire in 1987, at age 31. Forbes magazine ranked him as the world's wealthiest person in their The World's Billionaires list for 18 out of 24 years between 1995 and 2017, including 13 years consecutively from 1995 to 2007. Gates became the first centibillionaire in 1999, when his net worth briefly surpassed US$100 billion. According to Forbes, as of November 2026, his net worth stood at US$121.2 billion, making him the 17th-wealthiest individual in the world.

Born and raised in Seattle, Washington, Gates was privately educated at Lakeside School, where he befriended Allen and developed his computing interests. In 1973, he enrolled at Harvard University, where he took classes including Math 55 and graduate-level computer science courses, but he dropped out in 1975 to co-found and lead Microsoft. He served as its CEO for the next 25 years and also became president and chairman of the board when the company was incorporated in 1981. Succeeded as CEO by Steve Ballmer in 2000, he transitioned to chief software architect, a position he held until 2008. He stepped down as chairman of the board in 2014 and became technology adviser to CEO Satya Nadella and other Microsoft leaders, a position he still holds. He resigned from the board in 2020.

Over time, Gates reduced his role at Microsoft to focus on his philanthropic work with the Bill & Melinda Gates Foundation, the world's largest private charitable organization, which he and his then-wife, Melinda French Gates, co-chaired from 2000 until 2024. Focusing on areas including health, education, and poverty alleviation, Gates became known for his efforts to combat transmissible diseases such as tuberculosis, malaria, and polio. After French Gates resigned as co-chair following the couple's divorce, the foundation was renamed the Gates Foundation, with Gates as its sole chair.

Gates is the founder and chairman of several other companies, including BEN, Cascade Investment, TerraPower, Gates Ventures, and Breakthrough Energy. In 2010, he and Warren Buffett founded the Giving Pledge, whereby they and other billionaires pledged to give at least half their wealth to philanthropy. Named as one of the 100 most influential people of the 20th century by Time magazine in 1999, he has received numerous other honors and accolades, including a Presidential Medal of Freedom, awarded jointly to him and French Gates in 2016 for their philanthropic work. The subject of several documentary films, he published the first of three planned memoirs, Source Code: My Beginnings, in 2025.

== Early life and education ==
William Henry Gates III was born on October 28, 1955, in Seattle, Washington, as the only son of Bill Gates Sr. (Note: While Bill Sr. was legally named Wiliam Henry Gates II, he has been known as Bill Gates Sr. since his son became famous to avoid confusion with him.) (1925–2020) and his first wife, Mary Maxwell Gates (1929–1994). His ancestry includes English, German, and Irish/Scots-Irish. His father was a prominent lawyer, and his mother served on the board of directors of First Interstate BancSystem and United Way of America. Gates's maternal grandfather, J. W. Maxwell, was a national bank president. Gates also has an older sister, Kristi (Kristianne), and a younger sister, Libby. He is the fourth of his name in his family, but is known as William Gates III or "Trey" (i.e., three) because his father had the "II" suffix. The family lived in the Sand Point area of Seattle in a home that was damaged by a rare tornado when Gates was 7.

When Gates was young, his parents wanted him to pursue a career in law. During his childhood, his family regularly attended a church of the Congregational Christian Churches, a Protestant Reformed denomination.

Gates was small for his age and was bullied as a child. The family encouraged competition; one visitor reported that "it didn't matter whether it was hearts or pickleball or swimming to the dock; there was always a reward for winning, and there was always a penalty for losing".

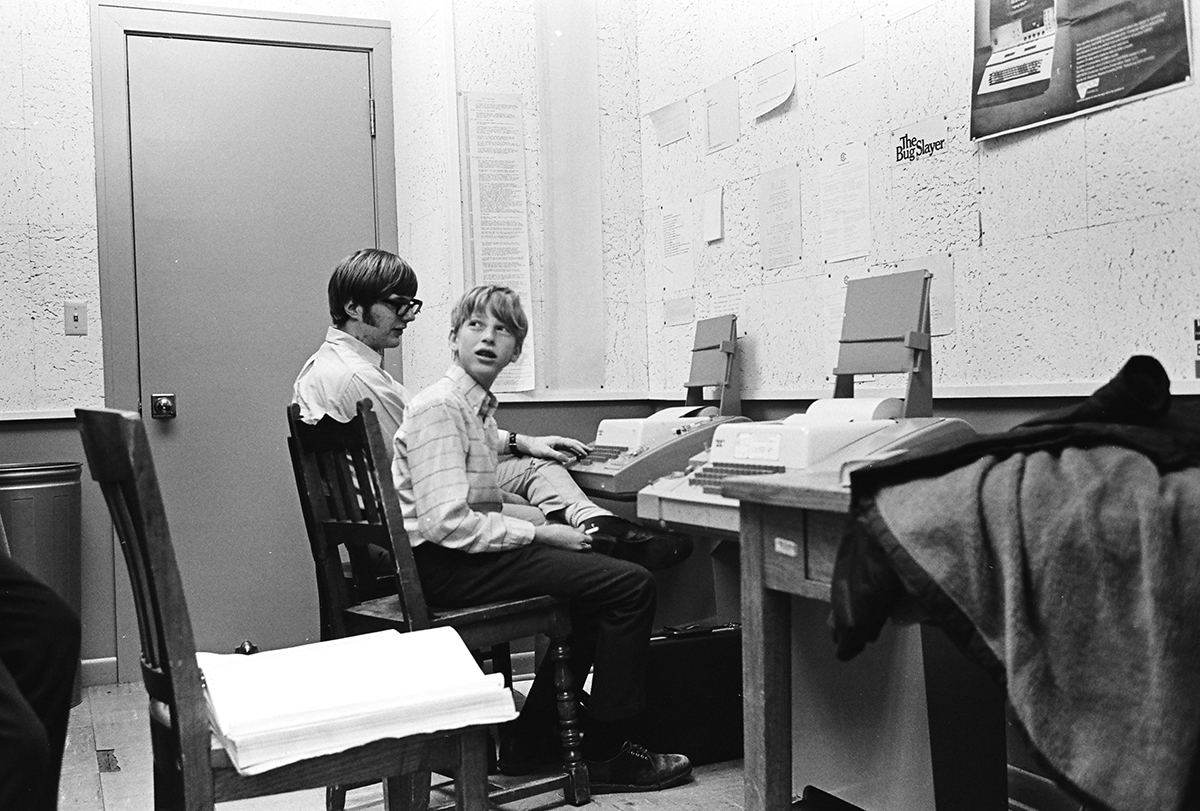
Gates (right) with Paul Allen seated at Teletype Model 33 ASR terminals in Lakeside School, 1970

At age 13, Gates enrolled in the private Lakeside Prep School. When he was in the eighth grade, the Mothers' Club at the school used proceeds from Lakeside School's rummage sale to buy a Teletype Model 33 ASR terminal and a block of computer time on a General Electric (GE) computer for the students. Gates took an interest in programming the GE system in BASIC, and he was excused from math classes to pursue his interest. He wrote his first computer program on this machine, an implementation of tic-tac-toe that allowed users to play games against the computer. Gates was fascinated by the machine and how it would always execute software code perfectly.

After the Mothers Club donation was exhausted, Gates and other students sought time on systems, including DEC PDP minicomputers. One of these systems was a PDP-10 belonging to Computer Center Corporation (CCC), which banned Gates, Paul Allen, Ric Weiland, and Gates's best friend and first business partner, Kent Evans, for the summer after it caught them exploiting bugs in the operating system to obtain free computer time.

The four students formed the Lakeside Programmers Club to make money. At the end of the ban, they offered to find bugs in CCC's software in exchange for extra computer time. Rather than using the system remotely via Teletype, Gates went to CCC's offices and studied source code for various programs that ran on the system, including Fortran, Lisp, and machine language. The arrangement with CCC continued until 1970, when the company went out of business.

In 1971, a Lakeside teacher enlisted Gates and Evans to automate the school's class-scheduling system, providing them computer time and royalties in return. The duo worked diligently in order to have the program ready for their senior year. Towards the end of their junior year, Evans was killed in a mountain climbing accident, which Gates described as one of the saddest days of his life. He then turned to Allen, who helped him finish the system for Lakeside.

At age 17, Gates formed a venture with Allen called Traf-O-Data to make traffic counters based on the Intel 8008 processor. In 1972, he served as a congressional page in the House of Representatives. He was a national merit scholar when he graduated from Lakeside School in 1973. He scored 1590 out of 1600 on the SAT and enrolled at Harvard University in the autumn of 1973.

Gates did not stay at Harvard long enough to choose a concentration, but took mathematics (including Math 55) and graduate-level computer science courses. While at Harvard, he met fellow student and future Microsoft CEO Steve Ballmer. Gates left Harvard after two years while Ballmer stayed and graduated magna cum laude. Years later, Ballmer succeeded Gates as Microsoft's CEO and maintained that position from 2000 until his resignation in 2014.

Gates devised an algorithm for pancake sorting as a solution to one of a series of unsolved problems presented in a combinatorics class by Professor Harry Lewis. His solution held the record as the fastest version for over 30 years, and its successor is faster by only 2%. His solution was formalized and published in collaboration with Harvard computer scientist Christos Papadimitriou.

Gates remained in contact with Paul Allen and joined him at Honeywell during the summer of 1974. In 1975, the MITS Altair 8800 was released based on the Intel 8080 CPU, and Gates and Allen saw the opportunity to start their own computer software company. Gates dropped out of Harvard that same year. His parents were supportive of him after seeing how much he wanted to start his own company. He explained his decision to leave Harvard: "If things hadn't worked out, I could always go back to school. I was officially on leave."

== Business career ==
=== Microsoft ===
==== BASIC ====
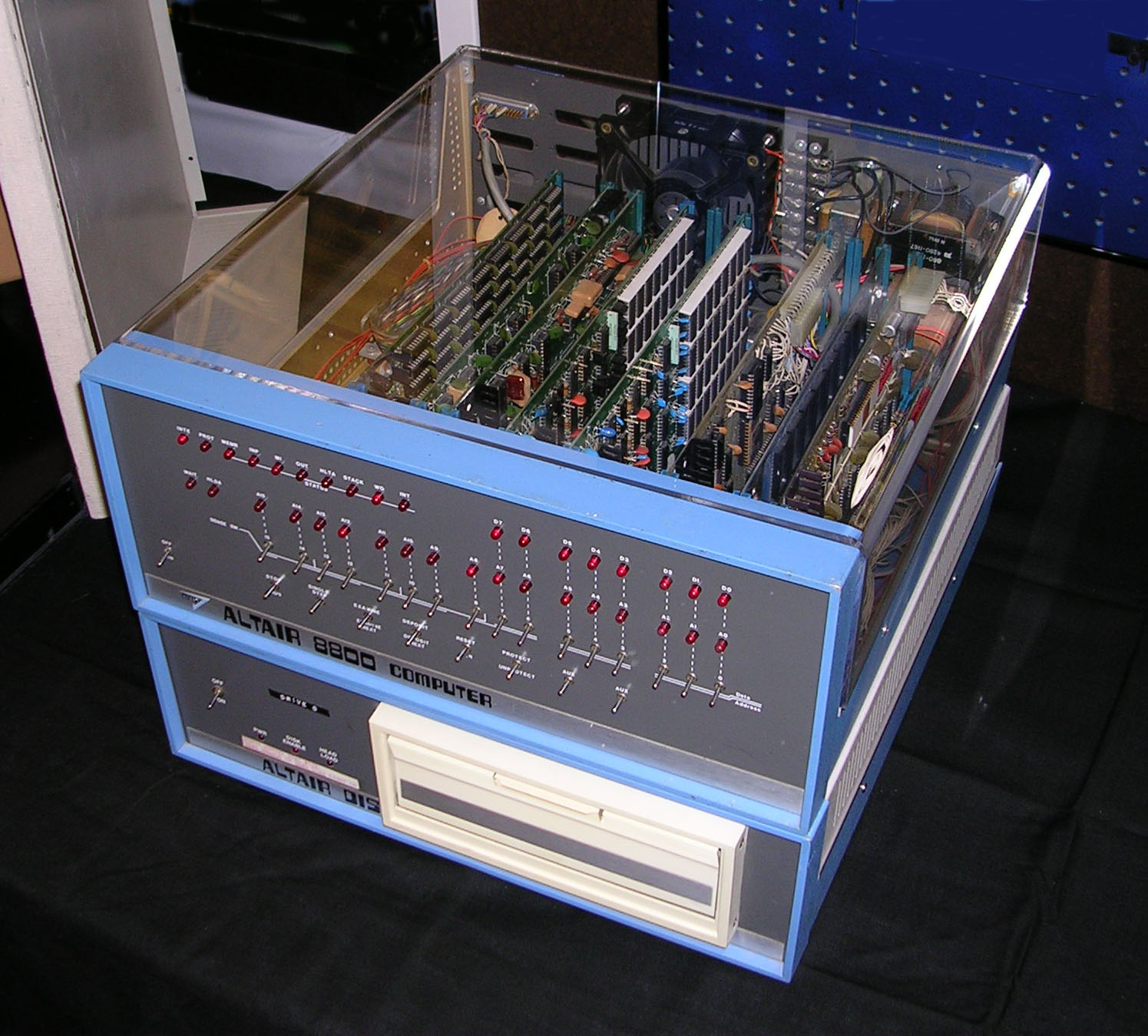
A MITS Altair 8800 Computer with 8-inch (200 mm) floppy disk system, whose first programming language was Microsoft's founding product, Altair BASIC

Gates read the January 1975 issue of Popular Electronics, which demonstrated the Altair 8800, and contacted Micro Instrumentation and Telemetry Systems (MITS) to inform them that he and others were working on a BASIC interpreter for the platform. In reality, Gates and Allen did not have an Altair and had not written code for it; they merely wanted to gauge MITS's interest. MITS president Ed Roberts agreed to meet them for a demonstration, and over the course of a few weeks, they developed an Altair emulator that ran on a minicomputer and then the BASIC interpreter.

The demonstration was held at MITS's offices in Albuquerque, New Mexico. It was a success and resulted in a deal with MITS to distribute the interpreter as Altair BASIC. MITS hired Allen, and Gates took a leave of absence from Harvard to work with him at MITS in November 1975. Allen named their partnership "Micro-Soft", a combination of "microcomputer" and "software". Their first office was in Albuquerque. The first employee Gates and Allen hired was their high school collaborator Ric Weiland. They dropped the hyphen within a year and officially registered the trade name "Microsoft" with the Secretary of the State of New Mexico on November 26, 1976. Gates never returned to Harvard to complete his studies.

Microsoft's Altair BASIC was popular with computer hobbyists, but Gates discovered that a pre-market copy had leaked out and was being widely copied and distributed. In February 1976, he wrote An Open Letter to Hobbyists in the MITS newsletter in which he asserted that more than 90% of the users of Microsoft Altair BASIC had not paid Microsoft for it, and the Altair "hobby market" was in danger of eliminating the incentive for any professional developers to produce, distribute, and maintain high-quality software. This letter was unpopular with many computer hobbyists, but Gates persisted in his belief that software developers should be able to demand payment. Microsoft became independent of MITS in late 1976, and it continued to develop programming language software for various systems. The company moved from Albuquerque to Bellevue, Washington, on January 1, 1979.

Gates said he personally reviewed and often rewrote every line of code that the company produced in its first five years. As the company grew, he transitioned into a manager role, then an executive. His ideas about programming and memories of the Altair BASIC project are described in the book Programmers at Work, a collection of interviews published by Microsoft Press in 1986.

==== IBM partnership ====
IBM, the leading supplier of computer equipment to commercial enterprises at the time, approached Microsoft in July 1980 concerning software for its upcoming personal computer, the IBM PC, after Gates's mother mentioned Microsoft to John Opel, IBM's then CEO. IBM first proposed that Microsoft write the BASIC interpreter. IBM's representatives also mentioned that they needed an operating system, and Gates referred them to Digital Research (DRI), makers of the widely used CP/M operating system. IBM's discussions with Digital Research went poorly, and they did not reach a licensing agreement. IBM representative Jack Sams mentioned the licensing difficulties during a subsequent meeting with Gates and asked if Microsoft could provide an operating system. A few weeks later, Gates and Allen proposed using 86-DOS, an operating system similar to CP/M, that Tim Paterson of Seattle Computer Products (SCP) had made for hardware similar to the PC. Microsoft made a deal with SCP to be the exclusive licensing agent of 86-DOS, and later the full owner. Microsoft employed Paterson to adapt the operating system for the PC and delivered it to IBM as PC DOS for a one-time fee of $50,000.

The contract itself only earned Microsoft a relatively small fee. It was the prestige brought to Microsoft by IBM's adoption of its operating system that would be the origin of Microsoft's transformation from a small business to the leading software company in the world. Gates had not offered to transfer the copyright on the operating system to IBM because he believed that other personal computer makers would clone IBM's PC hardware. They did, making the IBM-compatible PC, running DOS, a de facto standard. The sales of MS-DOS (the version of DOS sold to customers other than IBM) made Microsoft a major player in the industry. The press quickly identified Microsoft as being very influential on the IBM PC. PC Magazine asked if Gates was "the man behind the machine?".

Gates oversaw Microsoft's company restructuring on June 25, 1981, which re-incorporated the company in Washington state and made Gates the president and chairman of the board, with Paul Allen as vice president and vice chairman. In early 1983, Allen left the company after receiving a Hodgkin lymphoma diagnosis, effectively ending the formal business partnership between Gates and Allen, which had been strained months prior due to a contentious dispute over Microsoft equity. Later in the decade, Gates repaired his relationship with Allen, and together the two donated millions to their childhood school, Lakeside. They remained friends until Allen's death in October 2018.

==== Windows ====
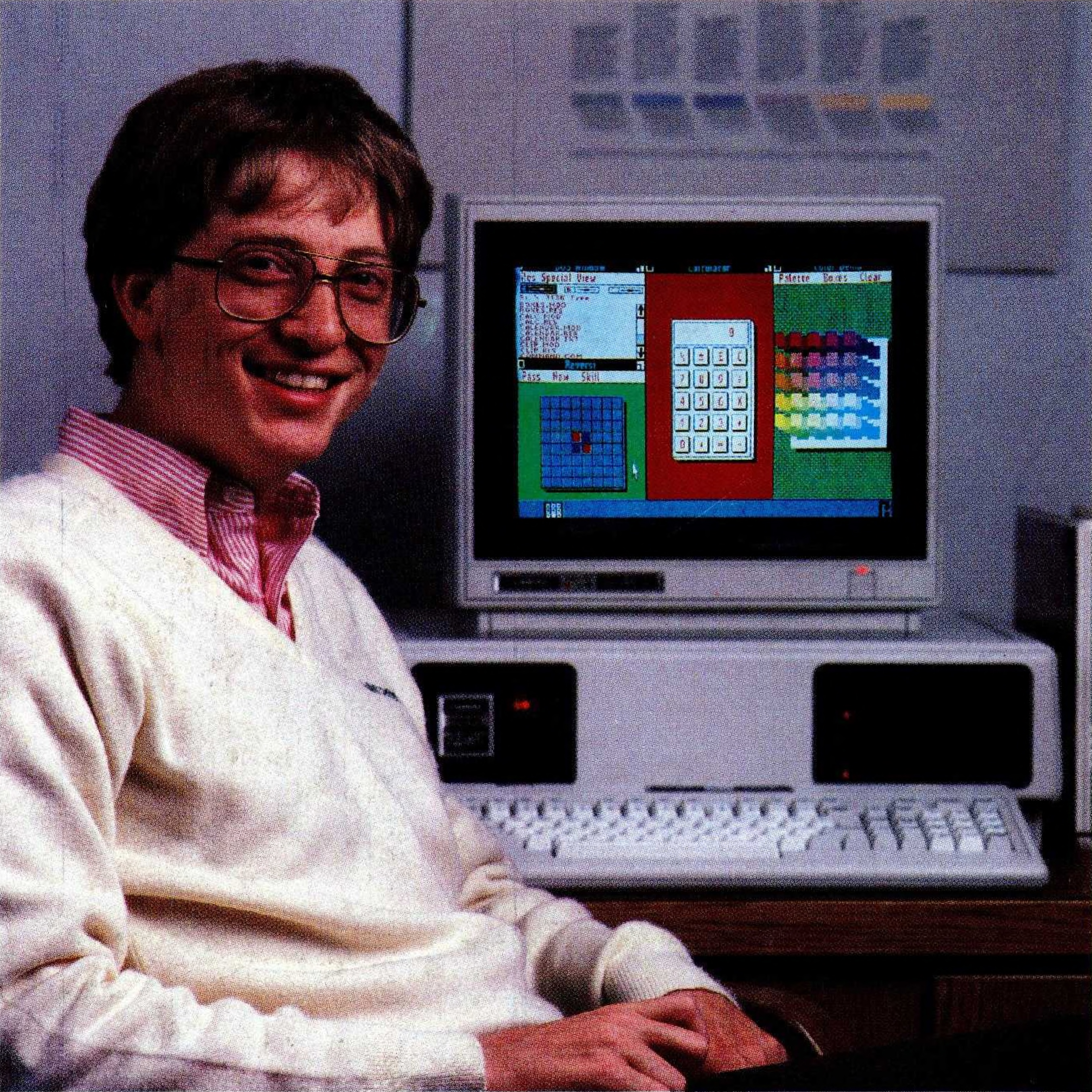
Bill Gates next to a Tandy 2000 running a development version of Windows 1.0, 1984

Microsoft and Gates launched their first retail version of Microsoft Windows on November 20, 1985, in an attempt to fend off competition from Apple's Macintosh GUI, which had captivated consumers with its simplicity and ease of use. In August 1986, the company struck a deal with IBM to develop a separate operating system called OS/2. Although the two companies successfully developed the first version of the new system, the partnership deteriorated due to mounting creative differences. The operating system grew out of DOS in an organic fashion over a decade until Windows 95, which hid the DOS prompt by default. Windows XP was released one year after Gates stepped down as Microsoft CEO. Windows 8.1 was the last version of the OS released before Gates left the chair of the firm to John W. Thompson on February 5, 2014.

==== Antitrust litigation ====
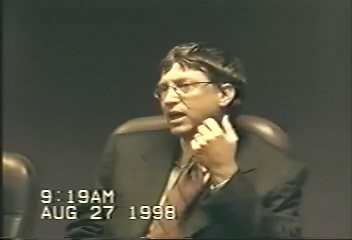
Gates giving his deposition at Microsoft on August 27, 1998

During his tenure as CEO of Microsoft, Gates approved of many decisions that led to antitrust litigation over Microsoft's business practices. In 1998's United States v. Microsoft Corp., Gates gave deposition testimony that several journalists characterized as evasive. He argued with examiner David Boies over the contextual meaning of words such as "compete", "concerned", and "we". Later in the year, when portions of the videotaped deposition were played back in court, the judge was seen laughing and shaking his head. BusinessWeek reported:

Early rounds of his deposition show him offering obfuscatory answers and saying "I don't recall" so many times that even the presiding judge had to chuckle. Worse, many of the technology chief's denials and pleas of ignorance were directly refuted by prosecutors with snippets of e-mail that Gates both sent and received.

Gates later said that he had simply resisted attempts by Boies to mischaracterize his words and actions. "Did I fence with Boies? ... I plead guilty ... rudeness to Boies in the first degree." Despite Gates's denials, the judge ruled that Microsoft had committed monopolization, tying and blocking competition, each in violation of the Sherman Antitrust Act.

==== Management style ====
Some Microsoft employees, including key executives, have begun to act, speak, and sometimes look a bit like Gates. They may rock in their chairs, as if they were ready to go somewhere, or end each sentence by elongating the last word.

— Computerworld, 1987

In my [early 1990s] BillG review meeting, the whole reporting hierarchy was there, along with their cousins, sisters, and aunts, and a person who came along from my team whose whole job during the meeting was to keep an accurate count of how many times Bill said the F word. The lower the f***-count, the better ... [After the meeting] "Four," announced the f*** counter, and everyone said, "wow, that's the lowest I can remember. Bill is getting mellow in his old age." He was, you know, 36.

— Joel Spolsky, 2006

During Microsoft's early years, Gates was an active software developer, particularly in the company's programming language products, but his primary role in most of the company's history was as a manager and executive. He has not officially been on a development team since working on the TRS-80 Model 100, but he wrote code that shipped with the company's products as late as 1989.

Gates gained a reputation for being distant from others; an industry executive complained in 1981 that "Gates is notorious for not being reachable by phone and for not returning phone calls". He saw competition in personal terms; when Borland's Turbo Pascal performed better than Microsoft's own tools, he yelled at programming director Greg Whitten "for half an hour" because, Gates believed, Borland's Philippe Kahn had surpassed Gates. An Atari executive recalled that he showed Gates a game and defeated him 35 of 37 times. When they met again a month later, Gates "won or tied every game. He had studied the game until he solved it. That is a competitor".

In the early 1980s, while business partner Paul Allen was undergoing treatments for cancer, Gates—according to Allen—conspired to reduce Allen's share in Microsoft by issuing himself stock options. In his autobiography, Allen would later recall that Gates was "scheming to rip me off. It was mercenary opportunism plain and simple". Gates says he remembers the episode differently. Allen would also recall that Gates was prone to shouting episodes.

Jerry Pournelle wrote in 1985 when Gates announced Microsoft Excel: "Bill Gates likes the program, not because it's going to make him a lot of money (although I'm sure it will do that), but because it's a neat hack." During the late 1990s, he was criticized for his business tactics, which were considered anti-competitive. This opinion has been upheld by numerous court rulings.

By 1987, Computerworld quoted an industry observer who said "Bill personifies Microsoft, and hotshots want to work for him". Joel Spolsky recalled how, when presenting Visual Basic for Applications for approval in the early 1990s, Gates had in one night read the technical specification of 500 pages and written notes on every page: "You couldn't bullshit him for a minute because he was a programmer. A real, actual, programmer".

Gates has often been accused of bullying Microsoft employees. He met regularly with Microsoft's senior managers and program managers, and the managers described him as being verbally combative, berating them for perceived holes in their business strategies or proposals that placed the company's long-term interests at risk. Gates interrupted presentations with such comments as "that's the stupidest thing I've ever heard" and "why don't you just give up your options and join the Peace Corps?" The target of his outburst would then have to defend the proposal in detail until Gates was fully convinced. Spolsky recalled being told after his presentation to Gates:

Bill doesn't really want to review your spec, he just wants to make sure you've got it under control. His standard M.O. is to ask harder and harder questions until you admit that you don't know, and then he can yell at you for being unprepared.

Not all harsh language was criticism; a manager recalled that "You're full of shit. That's the stupidest fucking thing I've ever heard" meant that Gates was amazed. "In the lore of Microsoft, if Bill says that to you, you're made". When subordinates appeared to be procrastinating, he was known to remark sarcastically, "I'll do it over the weekend".

In June 2006, Gates announced that he would transition out of his role at Microsoft to dedicate more time to philanthropy. He gradually divided his responsibilities between two successors when he placed Ray Ozzie in charge of management and Craig Mundie in charge of long-term product strategy. The process took two years to fully transfer his duties to Ozzie and Mundie, and was completed on June 27, 2008.

=== Business ventures and investments (partial list) ===
Gates has a multi-billion dollar investment portfolio with stakes in companies in multiple sectors and has participated in several entrepreneurial ventures beyond Microsoft, including:

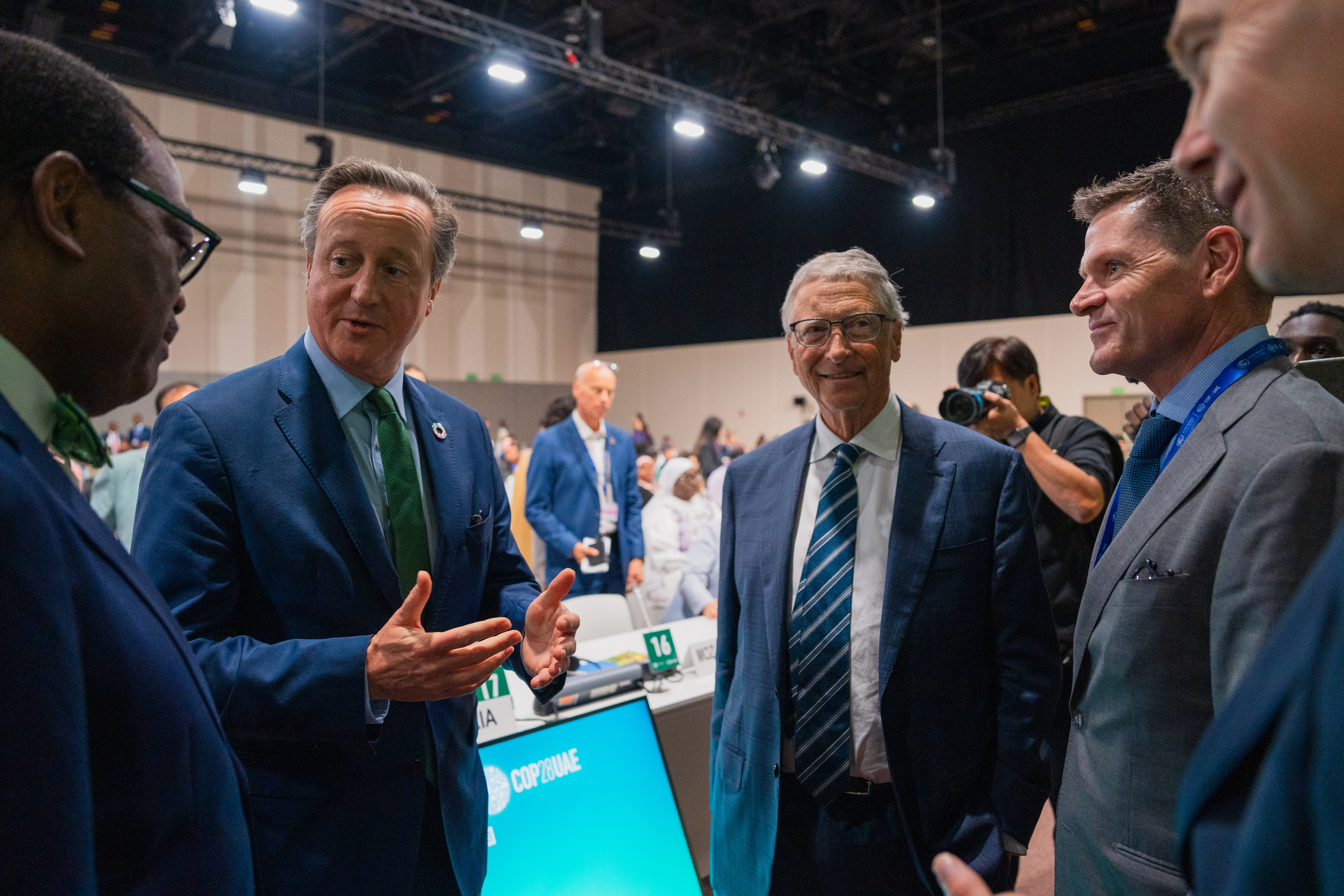
Gates and UK Foreign Secretary David Cameron at COP28 in Dubai on December 1, 2023

- AutoNation, an automotive retailer which trades on the NYSE and in which Gates has a 16% stake.
- bgC3 LLC, a think-tank and research company founded by Gates.
- Canadian National Railway (CN), a Canadian Class I freight railway. As of 2019, Gates is the single largest shareholder of the company.
- Cascade Investment LLC, a private investment and holding company incorporated in the United States, founded and controlled by Gates and headquartered in Kirkland, Washington.
  - Gates is the largest private owner of farmland in the United States with his landholdings owned through Cascade Investment totalling 242,000 acres across 19 states. He is the 49th largest private owner of land in the US.
- Carbon Engineering, a for-profit venture founded by David Keith, which Gates helped fund. It is also supported by Chevron Corporation and Occidental Petroleum.
  - SCoPEx, Keith's academic venture in "sun-dimming" geoengineering, which Gates provided most of the $12 million for.
- Corbis (originally named Interactive Home Systems, then Corbis and now known as Branded Entertainment Network), a digital image licensing and rights services company founded and chaired by Gates. Corbis Images, its enormous photo image library, was sold to a Chinese firm in January 2016.
- EarthNow, a Seattle-based startup company aiming to blanket the Earth with live satellite video coverage. Gates is a large financial backer.
- Eclipse Aviation, a defunct manufacturer of very light jets. Gates was a major stake-holder early on in the project.
- Impossible Foods, a company that develops plant-based substitutes for meat products. Some of the $396 million Patrick O. Brown collected for his business came from Gates around 2014 to 2017.
- Ecolab, a global provider of water, hygiene and energy technologies and services to the food, energy, healthcare, industrial and hospitality markets. Combined with the shares owned by the Foundation, Gates owns 11.6% of the company. A shareholder agreement in 2012 allowed him to own up to 25% of the company, but this agreement was removed.
- ResearchGate, a social networking site for scientists. Gates participated in a $35 million round of financing along with other investors.
- TerraPower, a nuclear reactor design company co-founded and chaired by Gates, which is developing next generation traveling-wave reactor nuclear power plants in an effort to tackle climate change.
- Breakthrough Energy Ventures, a closed fund for wealthy individuals who seek ROI on a 20-year horizon (see next section), which "is funding green start-ups and a host of other low-carbon entrepreneurial projects, including everything from advanced nuclear technology to synthetic breast milk". It was founded by Gates in 2015.
- Ginkgo Bioworks, a biotech startup that received $350 million in venture funding in 2019, in part from Gates's investment firm Cascade Investment.
- Luminous Computing, a company that develops neuromorphic photonic integrated circuits for artificial intelligence acceleration.
- Mologic, a British diagnostic technology company that Gates purchased, along with the Soros Economic Development Fund, "which has developed 10-minute Covid lateral flow tests that it aims to make for as little as $1".

== Later life ==
Since leaving day-to-day operations at Microsoft, Gates has continued his philanthropy and works on other projects. He stepped down as chairman of Microsoft in February 2014 to become a technology advisor at the firm to support newly appointed CEO Satya Nadella.

Gates provided his perspective on a range of issues in an interview that was published in the March 2014 issue of Rolling Stone magazine. In the interview, he provided his perspective on climate change, his charitable activities, various tech companies and people involved in them, and the state of America. In response to a question about his greatest fear when he looks 50 years into the future, Gates stated: "there'll be some really bad things that'll happen in the next 50 or 100 years, but hopefully none of them on the scale of, say, a million people that you didn't expect to die from a pandemic, or nuclear or bioterrorism." Gates also identified innovation as the "real driver of progress" and pronounced that "America's way better today than it's ever been." Gates has often expressed concern about the potential harms of superintelligence; in a Reddit "ask me anything", he stated that:

First the machines will do a lot of jobs for us and not be super intelligent. That should be positive if we manage it well. A few decades after that though the intelligence is strong enough to be a concern. I agree with Elon Musk and some others on this and don't understand why some people are not concerned.

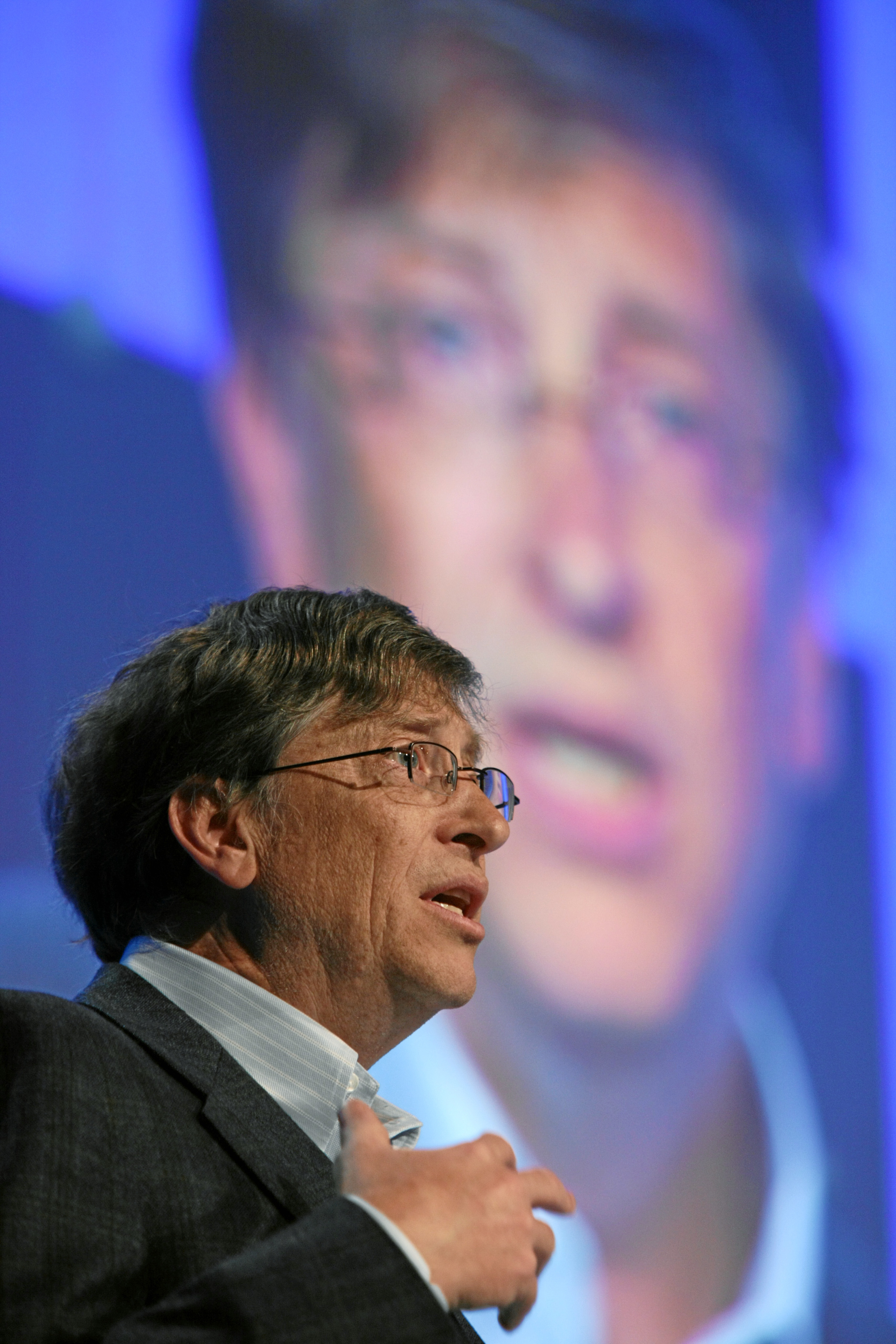
Gates delivers a speech at the World Economic Forum in Switzerland, January 2008.

In an interview that was held at the TED conference in March 2015, with Baidu co-founder and CEO, Robin Li, Gates said he would "highly recommend" Nick Bostrom's recent work, Superintelligence: Paths, Dangers, Strategies. During the conference, Gates warned that the world was not prepared for the next pandemic, a situation that would come to pass in late 2019 when the COVID-19 pandemic began. In March 2018, Gates met at his home in Seattle with Mohammed bin Salman, the crown prince and de facto ruler of Saudi Arabia, to discuss investment opportunities for Saudi Vision 2030. In June 2019, Gates admitted that losing the mobile operating system race to Android was his biggest mistake. He stated that it was within their skill set of be the dominant player, but partially blames the antitrust litigation during that time. That same year, Gates became an advisory board member of the Bloomberg New Economy Forum.

In March 2020, Microsoft announced Gates would be leaving his board positions at Berkshire Hathaway and Microsoft to dedicate himself to philanthropic endeavors such as climate change, global health and development, and education. The Wall Street Journal reported in May 2021 that Gates stepped down before Microsoft's board finished its investigation into Gates's alleged inappropriate sexual relationship with a Microsoft employee, which an external law firm had begun probing in late 2019.

During the COVID-19 pandemic, Gates has been looked at by media outlets as an expert on the issue, despite not being a public official or having any prior medical training. His foundation did, however, establish the COVID-19 Therapeutics Accelerator in 2020 to hasten the development and evaluation of new and repurposed drugs and biologics to treat patients for COVID-19 and, as of February 2021, Gates expressed that he and Anthony Fauci frequently talk and collaborate on matters including vaccines and other medical innovations to fight the pandemic.

== Philanthropy ==
In an interview with the BBC in 2025, Gates stated that his charitable donations have totalled $100 billion, of which $60 billion have gone to the Bill & Melinda Gates Foundation.

=== Bill & Melinda Gates Foundation ===
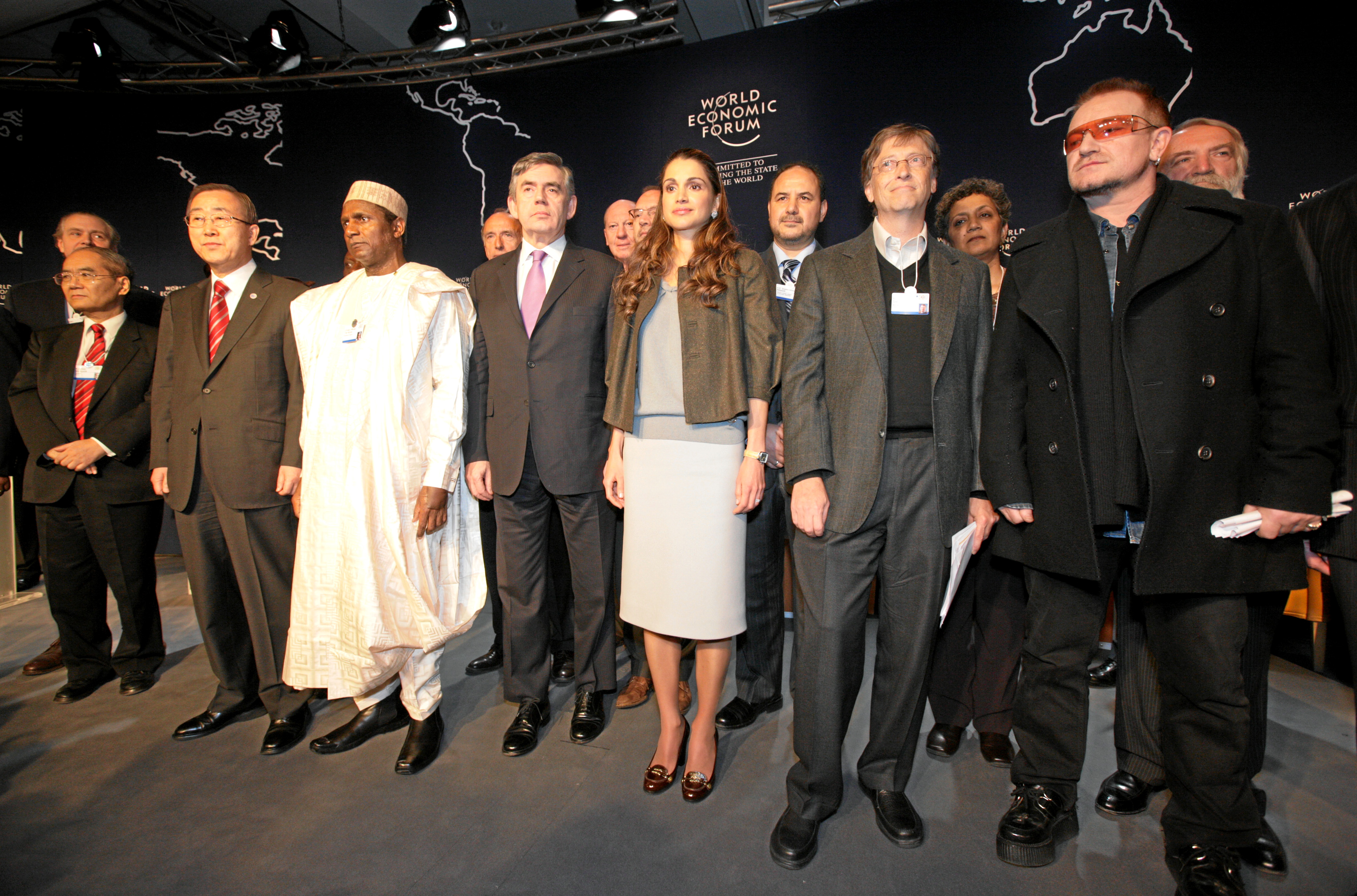
Gates with Bono, Queen Rania of Jordan, then British Prime Minister Gordon Brown, then President of Nigeria Umaru Yar'Adua and others during the Annual Meeting 2008 of the World Economic Forum

Gates studied the work of Andrew Carnegie and John D. Rockefeller, and donated some of his Microsoft stock in 1994 to create the "William H. Gates Foundation". In 2000, Gates and his wife combined three family foundations and donated stock valued at $5 billion to create the Bill & Melinda Gates Foundation, which was identified by the Funds for NGOs company in 2013, as the world's largest charitable foundation, with assets reportedly valued at more than $34.6 billion. The foundation allows benefactors to access information that shows how its money is being spent, unlike other major charitable organizations such as the Wellcome Trust. Gates, through his foundation, also donated $20 million to the Carnegie Mellon University for a new building to be named Gates Center for Computer Science which opened in 2009.

Gates has credited the generosity and extensive philanthropy of David Rockefeller as a major influence. He and his father met with Rockefeller several times, and their charity work is partly modeled on the Rockefeller family's philanthropic focus, whereby they are interested in tackling the global problems that are ignored by governments and other organizations.

The foundation is organized into five program areas: Global Development Division, Global Health Division, United States Division, and Global Policy & Advocacy Division. The foundation states, among others, that it supports a wide range of public health projects, granting aid to fight transmissible diseases such AIDS, tuberculosis and malaria, as well as widespread vaccine programs to eradicate polio. It grants funds to learning institutes and libraries and supports scholarships at universities. The foundation established a water, sanitation and hygiene program to provide sustainable sanitation services in poor countries. Its agriculture division supports the International Rice Research Institute in developing Golden Rice, a genetically modified rice variant used to combat vitamin A deficiency. The foundation aims to provide women and girls in the developing world with information and support regarding contraception and, ultimately, universal access to consensual family planning. In 2007, the Los Angeles Times criticized the foundation for investing its assets in companies that have been accused of worsening poverty, pollution and pharmaceutical firms that do not sell to developing countries. Although the foundation announced a review of its investments to assess social responsibility, it was subsequently canceled and upheld its policy of investing for maximum return, while using voting rights to influence company practices.

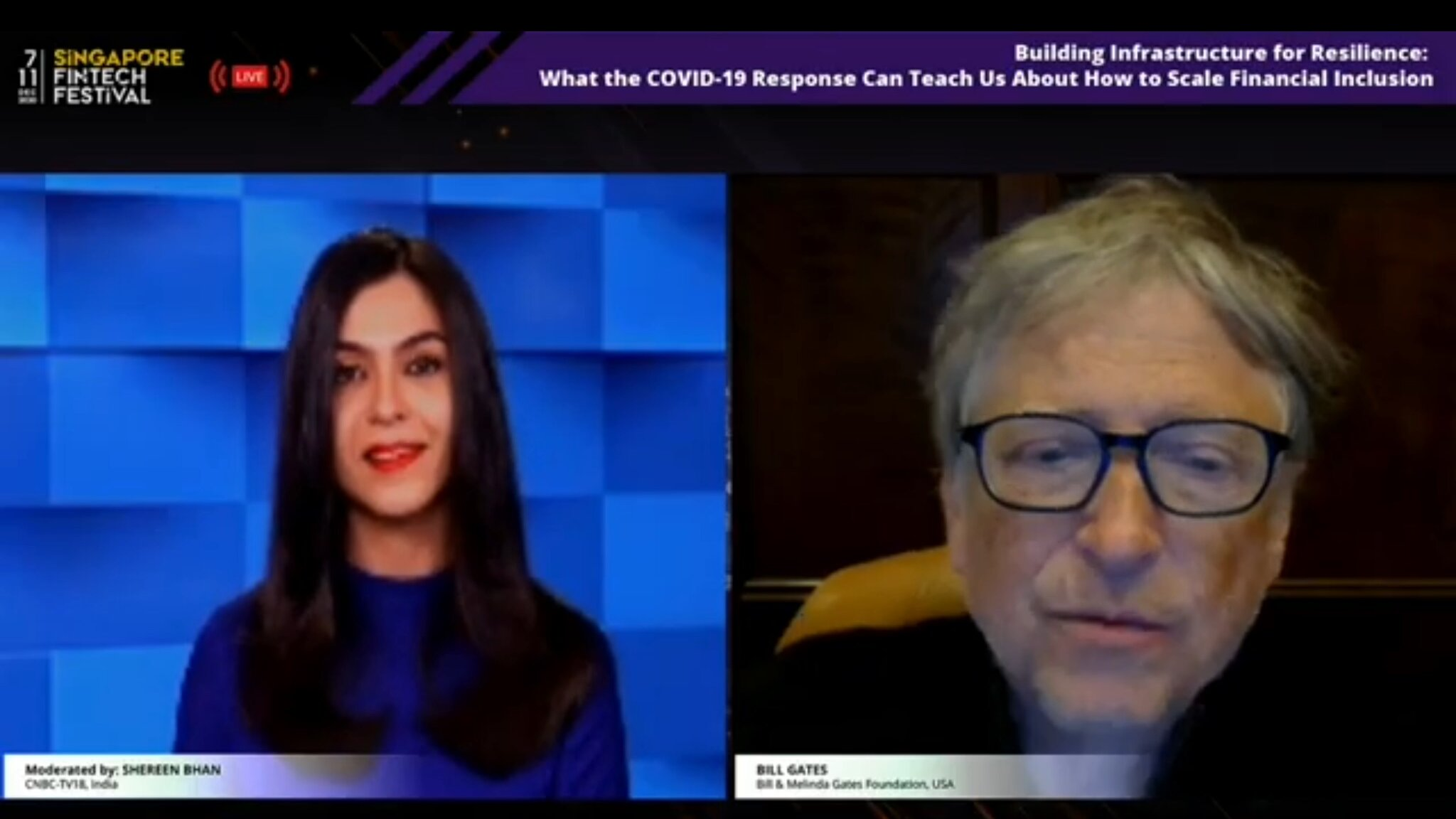
Gates in a fireside chat moderated by Shereen Bhan virtually at the Singapore FinTech Festival 2020

Gates delivered his thoughts in a fireside chat moderated by journalist and news anchor Shereen Bhan virtually at the Singapore FinTech Festival on December 8, 2020, on the topic, "Building Infrastructure for Resilience: What the COVID-19 Response Can Teach Us About How to Scale Financial Inclusion".

Governments are there to think ahead to bad things that might happen. In the case of (the COVID-19) pandemic, not enough was done. We can't forget that another pandemic will come and we'll need to invest in being ready in that, ... while not forgetting that we were not prepared and we're going to have to invest – just like having a fire department – some money in an intelligent way and actually simulate what might happen and make sure that we're ready for it.

In a November 2020 interview with actress Rashida Jones, Gates endorsed the wearing of face masks as a means to public reopening, derisively comparing anti-mask activism to "nudists" who oppose wearing pants.

=== Personal donations ===
Melinda Gates suggested that people should emulate the philanthropic efforts of the Salwen family, who sold their home and gave away half of its value, as detailed in their book, The Power of Half. Gates and his wife invited Joan Salwen to Seattle to speak about what the family had done, and on December 9, 2010, Bill and Melinda Gates and investor Warren Buffett each signed a commitment they called the "Giving Pledge", which is a commitment by all three to donate at least half of their wealth, over the course of time, to charity. The Foundation has received criticism, particularly over its role in Common Core, with critics stating the support is "cronyist" in that it profits from the "federal, state, and local contracts".

Gates has also provided personal donations to educational institutions. In 1999, Gates donated $20 million to the Massachusetts Institute of Technology for the construction of a computer laboratory named the "William H. Gates Building" that was designed by architect Frank Gehry. While Microsoft had previously given financial support to the institution, this was the first personal donation received from Gates.

The Maxwell Dworkin Laboratory of the Harvard John A. Paulson School of Engineering and Applied Sciences is named after the mothers of both Gates and Microsoft President Steven A. Ballmer, both of whom were students (Ballmer was a member of the school's graduating class of 1977, while Gates left his studies for Microsoft), and donated funds for the laboratory's construction. Gates also donated $6 million to the construction of the Gates Computer Science Building, completed in January 1996, on the campus of Stanford University. The building contains the Computer Science Department and the Computer Systems Laboratory (CSL) of Stanford's Engineering department.

Since 2005, Gates and his foundation have taken an interest in solving global sanitation problems. For example, they announced the "Reinvent the Toilet Challenge", which has received considerable media interest. To raise awareness for the topic of sanitation and possible solutions, Gates drank water that was "produced from human feces" in 2014 – it was produced from a sewage sludge treatment process called the Omni Processor. In early 2015, he also appeared with Jimmy Fallon on The Tonight Show and challenged him to see if he could taste the difference between this reclaimed water or bottled water.

In November 2017, Gates said he would give $50 million to the Dementia Discovery Fund, a venture capital fund that seeks treatment for Alzheimer's disease. He also pledged an additional $50 million to start-up ventures working in Alzheimer's research. Bill and Melinda Gates have said that they intend to leave their three children $10 million each as their inheritance. With only $30 million kept in the family, they are expected to give away about 99.96% of their wealth. In 2025 Bill Gates said in an interview with Raj Shammi that his children will inherit less than 1% of his wealth. On August 25, 2018, Gates distributed $600,000 through his foundation via UNICEF which is helping flood affected victims in Kerala, India.

In June 2018, Gates offered free ebooks, to all new graduates of U.S. colleges and universities, and in 2021, offered free ebooks, to all college and university students around the world. The Bill & Melinda Gates Foundation partially funds OpenStax, which creates and provides free digital textbooks. In July 2022 he reiterated the commitment he had made by starting the Giving Pledge campaign by announcing on his Twitter channel he planned to give 'virtually all' his wealth to charity and eventually 'move off of the list of the world's richest people'.

=== Charity sports events ===
In April 2017, Gates partnered with Swiss tennis player Roger Federer in playing in the Match for Africa 4, a noncompetitive tennis match at a sold-out Key Arena in Seattle. The event was in support of the Roger Federer Foundation's charity efforts in Africa. Federer and Gates played against John Isner, the top-ranked American player for much of this decade, and Mike McCready, the lead guitarist for Pearl Jam. The pair won the match 6 games to 4. Overall, they raised $2 million for children in Africa. The following year, Gates and Federer returned to play in the Match for Africa 5 on March 5, 2018, at San Jose's SAP Center. Their opponents were Jack Sock, one of the top American players and a grand slam winner in doubles, and Savannah Guthrie, a co-anchor for NBC's Today show. Gates and Federer recorded their second match victory together by a score of 6–3 and the event raised over $2.5 million.

== Political positions ==
=== Climate change and energy ===
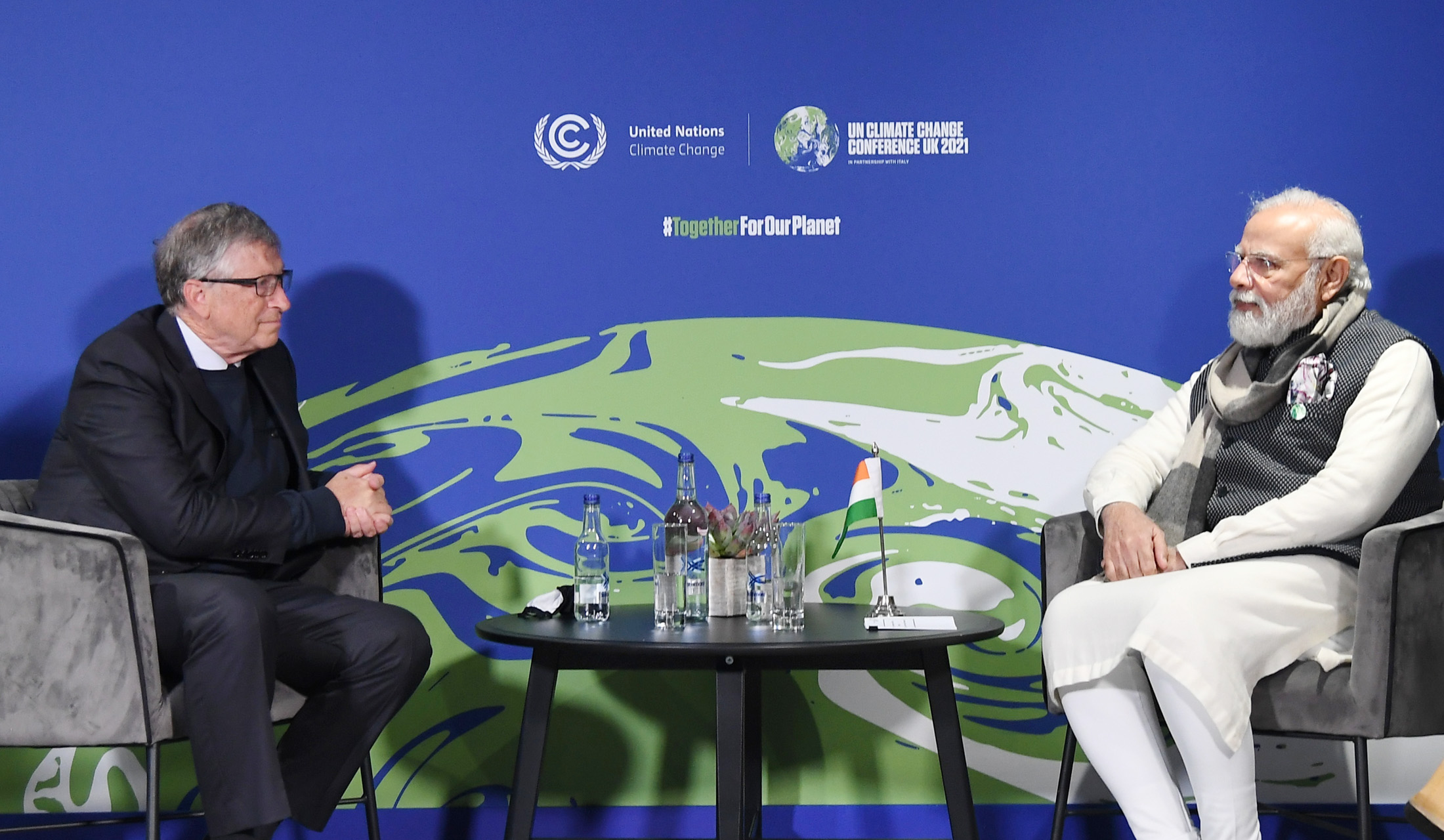
With Indian Prime Minister Narendra Modi at the COP26 climate summit in Glasgow in November 2021

Gates considers climate change and global access to energy to be critical, interrelated issues. He has urged governments and the private sector to invest in research and development to make clean, reliable energy cheaper. Gates envisions that a breakthrough innovation in sustainable energy technology could drive down both greenhouse gas emissions and poverty, and bring economic benefits by stabilizing energy prices. In 2011, he said, "If you gave me the choice between picking the next 10 presidents or ensuring that energy is environmentally friendly and a quarter as costly, I'd pick the energy thing."

In 2015, he wrote about the challenge of transitioning the world's energy system from one based primarily on fossil fuels to one based on sustainable energy sources. Global energy transitions have historically taken decades. He wrote, "I believe we can make this transition faster, both because the pace of innovation is accelerating, and because we have never had such an urgent reason to move from one source of energy to another." This rapid transition, according to Gates, would depend on increased government funding for basic research and financially risky private-sector investment, to enable innovation in diverse areas such as nuclear energy, grid energy storage to facilitate greater use of solar and wind energy, and solar fuels.

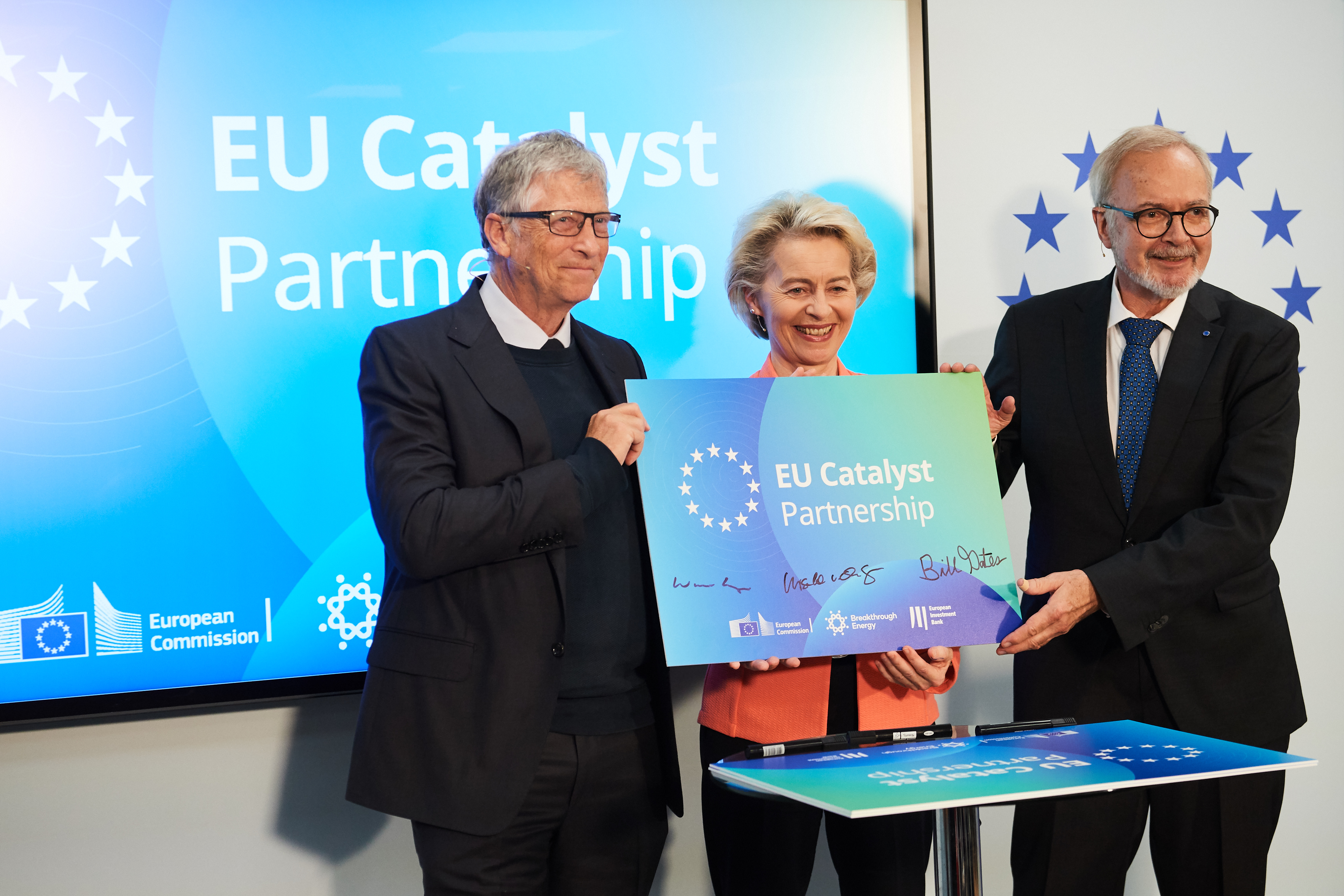
The European Commission, European Investment Bank and Gates' Breakthrough Energy Catalyst agreed at the 2021 UN Climate Change conference to work together to bring green technologies to market.

Gates spearheaded two initiatives that he announced at the 2015 United Nations Climate Change Conference in Paris. One was Mission Innovation, in which 20 national governments pledged to double their spending on research and development for carbon-free energy in over five years' time. Another initiative was Breakthrough Energy, a group of investors who agreed to fund high-risk startups in clean energy technologies. Gates, who had already invested $1 billion of his own money in innovative energy startups, committed a further $1 billion to Breakthrough Energy. In December 2020, he called for the U.S. federal government to create institutes for clean energy research, analogous to the National Institutes of Health. Gates has also urged rich nations to shift to 100% synthetic beef industries to reduce greenhouse gas emissions from food production.

Gates has been criticized for holding a large stake in Signature Aviation, a company that services emissions-intensive private jets. In 2019, he began to divest from fossil fuels. He does not expect divestment itself to have much practical impact, but says that if his efforts to provide alternatives were to fail, he would not want to personally benefit from an increase in fossil fuel stock prices. After he published his book How to Avoid a Climate Disaster, parts of the climate activist community criticized Gates's approach as technological solutionism. In 2022, educational streamer Wondrium produced the series "Solving for Zero: The Search for Climate Innovation", inspired by the book.

In June 2021, Gates's company TerraPower and Warren Buffett's PacifiCorp announced the first sodium nuclear reactor in Wyoming. Wyoming Governor Mike Gordon hailed the project as a step toward carbon-negative nuclear power. Wyoming Senator John Barrasso also said that it could boost the state's once-active uranium mining industry.

Gates supported the passage of the Inflation Reduction Act of 2022. He tried to convince Joe Manchin to support a climate bill starting in 2019, and especially in the months leading up to the adoption of the bill. The bill aimed to cut the global greenhouse gas emissions to a level similar to "eliminating the annual planet-warming pollution of France and Germany combined" and may help to limit the warming of the planet to 1.5 degrees – the target of the Paris Agreement. He thanked both Joe Manchin and Chuck Schumer for their efforts in a guest essay in The New York Times, where he said, "The Inflation Reduction Act of 2022 may be the single most important piece of climate legislation in American history", given its potential to spur development of new technologies. Gates gave further insights on climate change in his commencement address at Northern Arizona University on May 6, 2023, where he was bestowed an honorary doctorate.

Bill Gates is listed in The Independent Climate 100 List 2025. His view is that investing in new technologies is the most effective way to fight climate change. That includes investing in carbon removal, clean energy and electric vehicles.

==== 2025 climate memo ====
In October 2025, Gates issued a statement saying that climate change does not pose an existential threat to civilization, stating that while it remains a serious problem, it was more important to give money to other causes such as solving poverty and improving healthcare. The statement was criticized by climate scientists, who stated that many of the issues Gates described as more of a priority result from climate change. Katharine Hayhoe said: "Climate change is not a separate bucket...The reason we care about climate change is that it's the hole in every bucket." According to prominent climate scientist Michael E. Mann: "There is no greater threat to developing nations than the climate crisis...He's got this all backwards."

Gates's statement was received by some climate change deniers as proof that climate change is a "hoax". Donald Trump reacted by posting on social media that he had "just won the War on the Climate Change Hoax" because Gates had "finally admitted that he was completely WRONG on the issue." Gates responded to Trump's statement saying that it was "a gigantic misreading of the memo", telling Axios that he would actually increase his spending on climate and health.

The memo came a day after the United Nations said humanity had missed the 1.5-degree target and warning of "devastating consequences", some of which are linked to tipping points, like in the Amazon, Greenland, Western Antarctica, and coral reefs. The memo was also released around the same time Hurricane Melissa, strengthened by climate change, struck the Caribbean islands whose damage was calculated as costing Jamaica alone 30%–250% of its annual GDP.

=== Regulation of the software industry ===
In 1998, Gates rejected the need for regulation of the software industry in testimony before the United States Senate. During the Federal Trade Commission's (FTC) investigation of Microsoft in the 1990s, Gates was reportedly upset at then Commissioner Dennis Yao for "float[ing] a line of hypothetical questions suggesting possible curbs on Microsoft's growing monopoly power".

=== Donald Trump Facebook ban ===
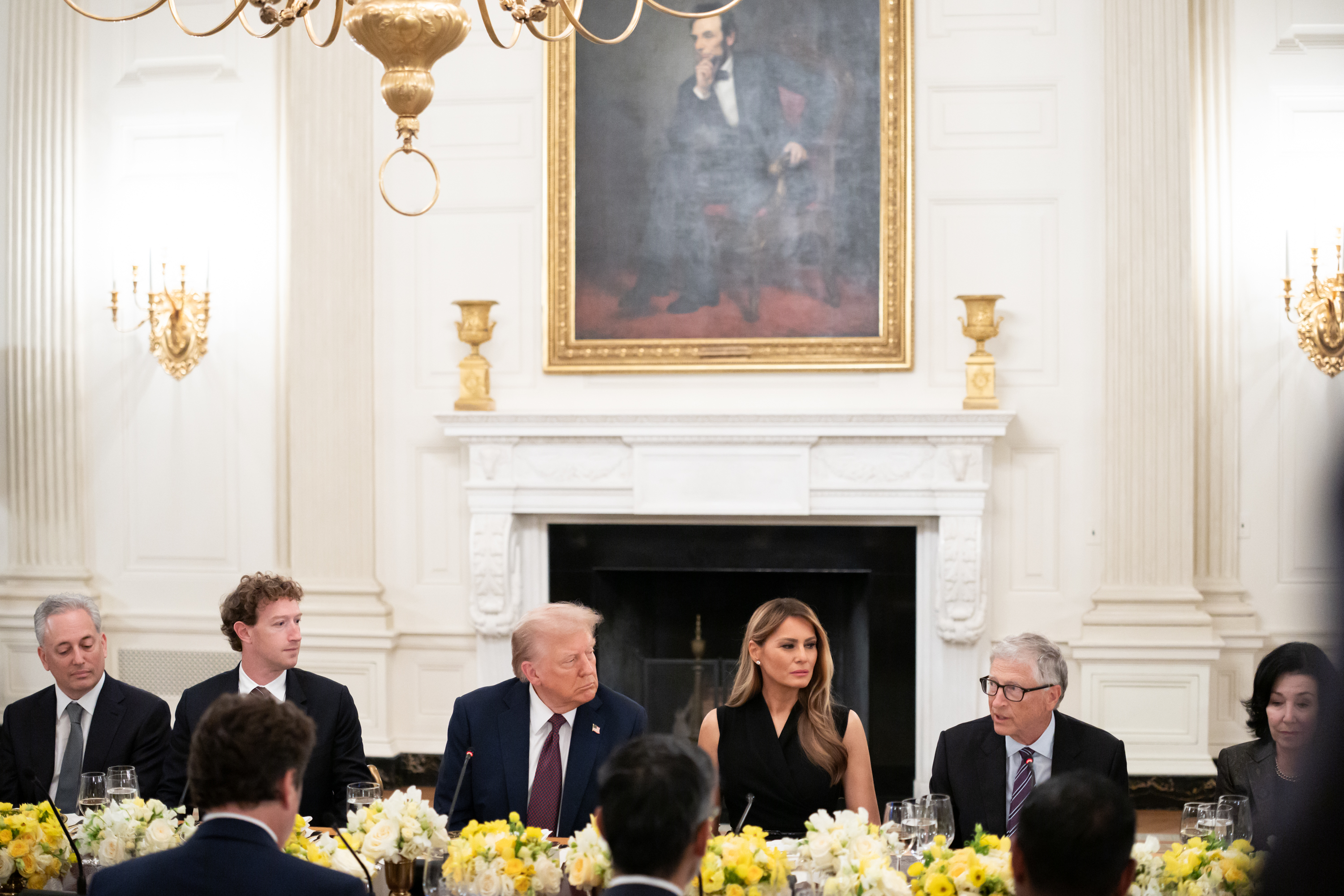
Gates during a September 2025 dinner hosted by President Trump

After Facebook and Twitter had banned Donald Trump from their platforms on January 7, 2021, as a result of the 2020 United States presidential election which led to the January 6 United States Capitol attack, Gates said in February that a permanent ban of Trump "would be a shame" and would be an "extreme measure". He warned that it would cause "polarization" if users with different political views divide up among various social networks, and said: "I don't think banning somebody who actually did get a fair number of votes (in the presidential election) – well less than a majority – but I don't think having him off forever would be that good."

=== Patents for COVID-19 vaccines ===
In April 2021, during the COVID-19 pandemic, Gates was criticized for suggesting that pharmaceutical companies should hold onto patents and intellectual property for COVID-19 vaccines. He opposed the TRIPS waiver. The Gates Foundation encouraged Oxford University to partner with a big company rather than give away the rights to its COVID-19 vaccine, as the university had initially announced. Oxford University eventually partnered with AstraZeneca. The criticism came due to the possibility of this preventing poorer nations from obtaining adequate vaccines. Gates argued that what limited widespread access was not intellectual property, but rather the time needed for safety protocols, and the difficulty of safely transferring vaccine production to new facilities. His views on the topic have been linked to his views on legal monopolies in software.

=== Political donations ===
In October 2024, The New York Times reported Gates had recently donated $50 million to Future Forward USA Action, a 501(c)(4) organization supporting Kamala Harris's 2024 presidential campaign. In response to the report, he did not explicitly address the donation or endorse Harris, but said "this election is different".

=== Cryptocurrencies ===
Gates has been critical of cryptocurrencies like Bitcoin. According to him, cryptocurrencies provide no "valuable output", contribute nothing to society, and pose a danger especially for smaller investors who could not survive the potentially high losses. Gates also does not own any cryptocurrencies himself.

=== Artificial intelligence ===
On August 26, 2026, Gates published an essay on his blog Gates Notes, titled "The turbulent AI era is here. The choices we make now are critical.", in which he argued that the transition to artificial intelligence would be "one of the most turbulent times in human history" and that "AI will either be the greatest equalizer ever invented, or the worst source of injustice". He wrote that the world was not preparing adequately and that "there is no plan to ease the entry into the AI era".

Gates set out three risks. The first was permanent job loss, concentrated in entry- and mid-level work, which he argued would differ from earlier technological transitions because AI can substitute for human cognition and would reach law, customer service, medicine, software and manufacturing "over the course of a decade rather than a few generations". The second was the empowerment of bad actors through AI-enabled cyberattacks, bioterrorism, fraud and surveillance, together with the prospect that AI systems "could begin to act against our interests and we could lose control". The third was harm to children's development from AI companions, which he likened to raising a child in "a big, protected greenhouse". In an accompanying interview he said that "we've crossed the threshold" on AI's biological, cyber, psychosocial and job-displacement capabilities.

He proposed three responses: new national bodies and an international organization to manage the transition, drawing on the precedents of nuclear weapons inspections, international aviation regulation and the ozone layer agreements; a category of work he called "Human Reserved" that would be performed only by people; and a tax on AI tokens and robots to fund retraining and the social safety net, on the grounds that the existing tax system "nudges you toward replacing people with machines". Gates wrote that he would support a credible plan to slow AI development globally but did not expect one to emerge, saying "the geopolitical and economic incentives are pushing too hard to go full speed ahead". He disclosed his continuing financial ties to the technology industry, and described the essay as the first of several he planned on the subject.

In an interview with The New York Times published the same day, Gates said that technology had genuinely astonished him three times: seeing a graphical user interface in 1980, a demonstration by OpenAI executives at his home in 2022 of the software that became ChatGPT, and, in 2026, the coding ability of Anthropic's Claude Code. Programming, he said, was the subject he knew best, and he described his reaction as "The idea that now these things are in a meaningful sense better than I am is like: What the hell?"

In the same interview Gates said the technology industry was knowingly understating the risks because of the money involved: "In private, people who understand how good this stuff is, and how much better it's getting, they're very worried", though few executives would say so publicly. He characterised the private view among them as "Hey, man, don't say that. It's bad for us, the next trillion dollars we're trying to raise." Gates rejected the voluntary safety measures then being developed by the White House and industry figures, saying "Self-regulation on the most dangerous tool ever invented? No, thanks!", and said he would press artificial intelligence on world leaders as one of only two issues he raised with them, alongside global health. He acknowledged that his wealth and his record at Microsoft, which was found in 2000 to have abused its monopoly, might make him a flawed messenger.

In an October 2026 interview on The Verge's Decoder podcast, Gates advocated government requirements for safeguards and monitoring in AI models capable of sophisticated cyberattacks. Asked about open-source models running on personal computers, he argued that sufficiently capable models should remain on platforms that prevent users from removing those protections. He linked the proposed restrictions to preventing cyberattacks and bioterrorism.

== Personal life ==
Gates is an avid reader, and the ceiling of his large home library is engraved with a quotation from The Great Gatsby. He also enjoys bridge, golf, and tennis. His days are planned for him on a minute-by-minute basis, similarly to the U.S. president's schedule. Despite his wealth and extensive business travel, Gates flew coach (economy class) in commercial aircraft until 1997, when he bought a private jet.

In the 1990s, Gates built an earth-sheltered mansion, designed by James Cutler and Peter Bohlin, in the side of a hill overlooking Lake Washington in Medina, Washington. The estate has been nicknamed "Xanadu 2.0" by Gates's biographers. In 2009, property taxes on the mansion were reported to be US$1.063 million, on a total assessed value of US$147.5 million. The 66,000-square-foot (6,100 m^{2}) estate has a 60-foot (18 m) swimming pool with an underwater music system, as well as a 2,500-square-foot (230 m^{2}) gym and a 1,000-square-foot (93 m^{2}) dining room.

Gates purchased the Codex Leicester, a collection of scientific writings by Leonardo da Vinci, for US$30.8 million at an auction in 1994. In 1998, he reportedly paid $30 million for the original 1885 maritime painting Lost on the Grand Banks, at the time a record price for an American painting. In 2016, he revealed that he was color-blind. In 2025, in Source Code, Gates wrote that he believed he was autistic.

=== Marriage, family and divorce ===
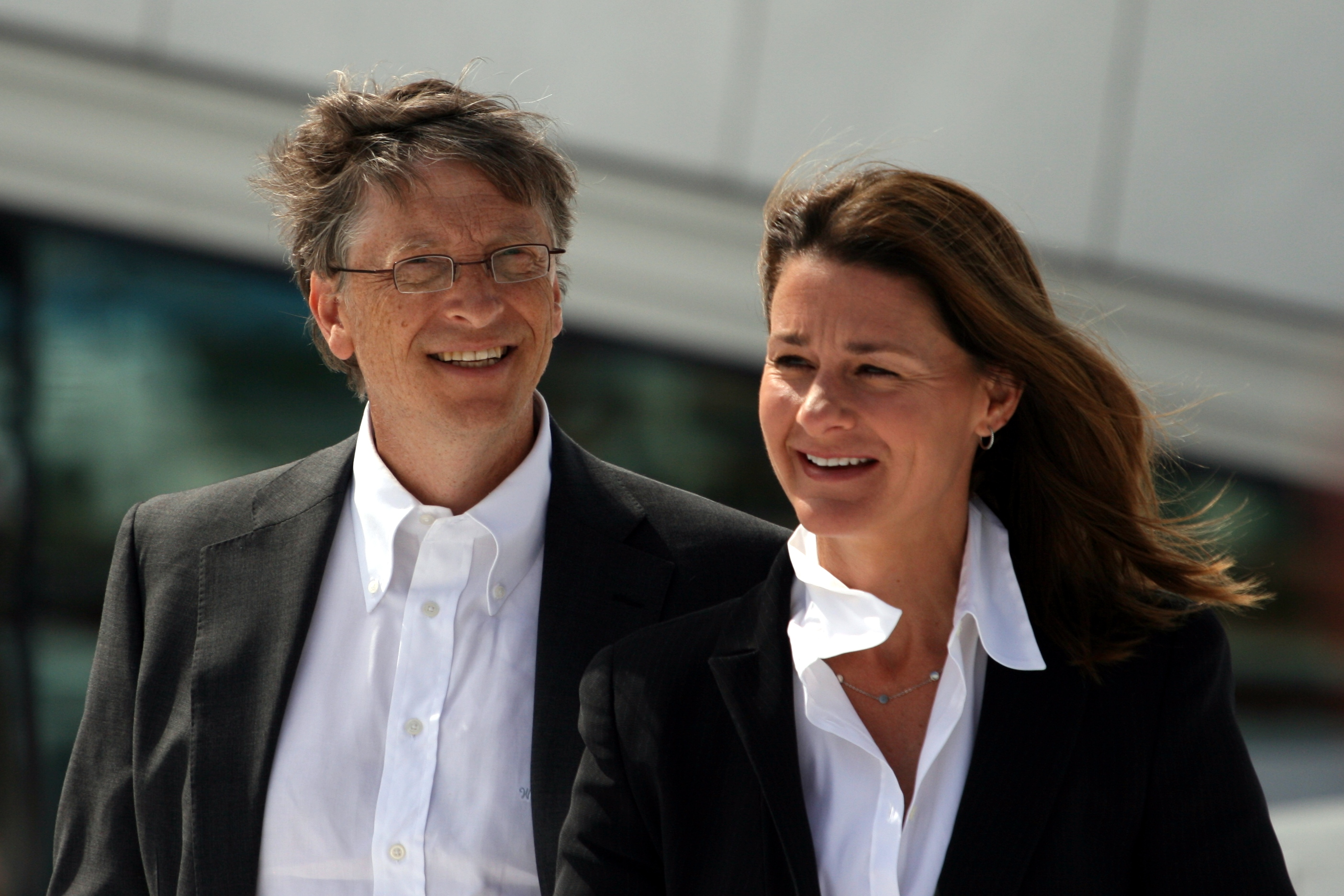
Gates with then wife Melinda, June 2009

In 1987, at a trade fair in New York, Gates met Melinda French, then a recent graduate of Duke University who had begun working at Microsoft around four months earlier. Gates and French became engaged in 1993 after dating for six years. They married on January 1, 1994, at the 12th hole of the Jack Nicklaus–designed Manele Golf Course on the Hawaiian Island of Lānaʻi. They have three children, two daughters and a son. On May 3, 2021, Bill and Melinda Gates announced their decision to divorce after more than 27 years of marriage. The Wall Street Journal reported that Melinda had begun meeting with divorce attorneys in 2019, citing interviews that suggested Gates's ties with Jeffrey Epstein were among her concerns. However, the couple delayed their divorce until their youngest child Phoebe Gates graduated from high school. The divorce was finalized on August 2, 2021, and the financial details have remained confidential.

In October 2021, Gates's eldest daughter Jennifer, a pediatrician and professional show-jumper, married Olympic equestrian Nayel Nassar, with whom she has two daughters, born in March 2023 and October 2024. His son Rory is pursuing a PhD at the Institute of World Politics. His youngest daughter Phoebe co-founded the digital fashion platform Phia and is an advocate for women's health and reproductive rights.

In February 2023, Gates confirmed that he was dating Paula Hurd (née Kalupa), widow of former Oracle Corporation and Hewlett-Packard chief executive Mark Hurd. Appearing on the Today show in February 2025, he described Hurd as a "serious girlfriend", stating he had "moved past the divorce".

=== Public image ===
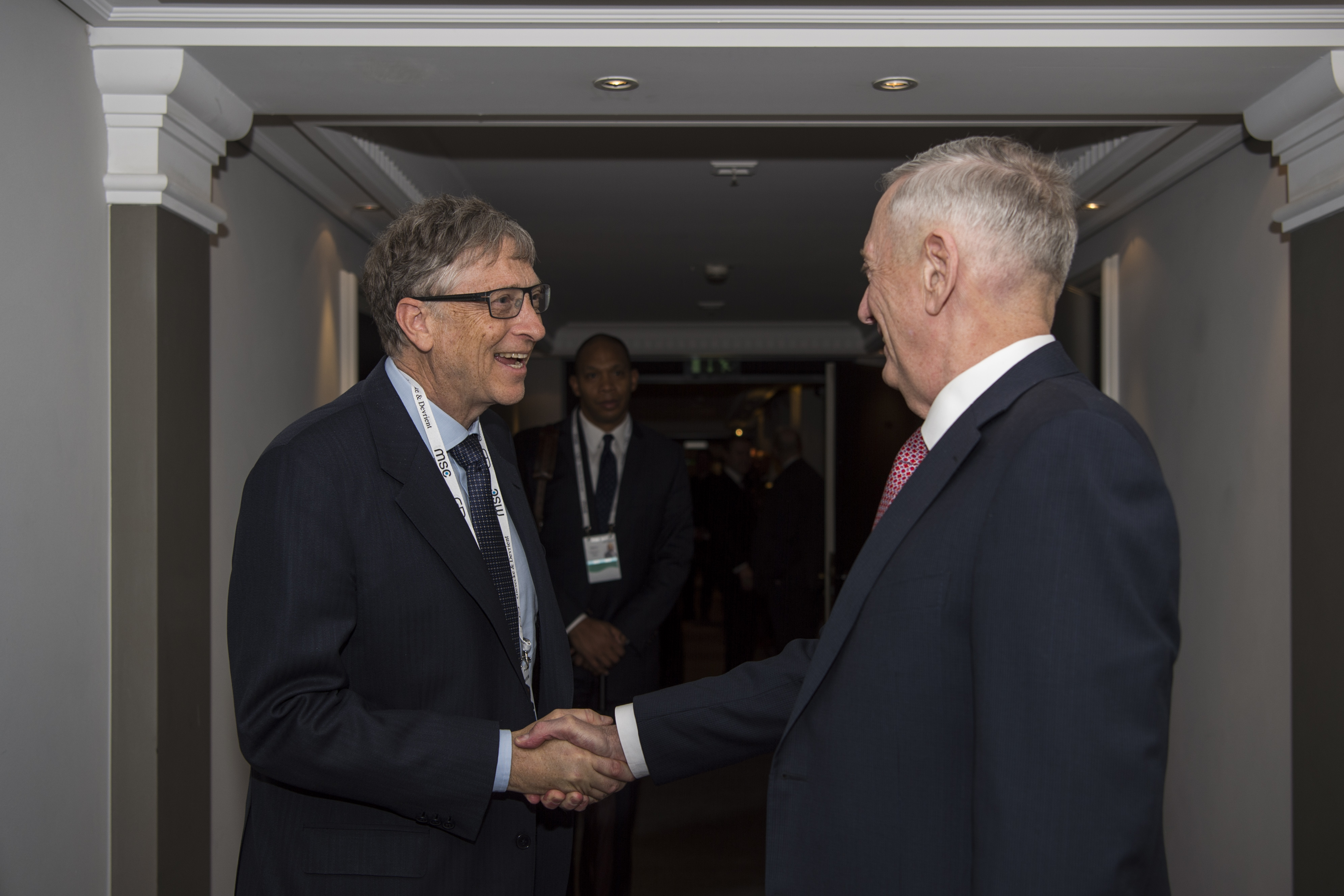
Gates with U.S. Secretary of Defense Jim Mattis, February 2017

Gates's public image has changed over the years. At first he was perceived as a brilliant but ruthless "robber baron", a "nerd-turned-tycoon". Starting in 2000 with the foundation of the Bill & Melinda Gates Foundation, and particularly after he stepped down as head of Microsoft, he turned his attention to philanthropy, spending more than $50 billion on causes like health, poverty, and education. His image morphed from "tyrannical technocrat to saintly savior" to a "huggable billionaire techno-philanthropist", celebrated on magazine covers and sought after for his opinions on major issues like global health and climate change. Still another shift in public opinion came in 2021 with the announcement that he and Melinda were divorcing. Coverage of that proceeding brought out information about romantic pursuits of women who worked for him, a long-term extra-marital affair, and a friendship with convicted sex offender Jeffrey Epstein. This information and his response to the COVID-19 pandemic resulted in some deterioration of his public image, going from "a lovable nerd who was out to save the world" to "a tech supervillain who wants to protect profits over public health".

Investigative journalist Tim Schwab has accused Gates of using his contributions to the media to shape their coverage of him in order to protect his public image. In September 2022, Politico published an exposé critical of NGO leadership at the helm of the worldwide COVID-19 pandemic response, written in cooperation with the German newspaper Die Welt. Criticisms included the interconnectivity of the non-profits with Gates, as well as his personal lack of formal credentials in medicine.

Gates and the projects of his foundation have been the subject of many conspiracy theories that proliferate on Facebook and elsewhere. He has been implausibly accused of attempting to depopulate the world, distributing harmful or unethical vaccines, and implanting people with privacy-violating microchips. These unfounded theories reached a new level of influence during the COVID-19 pandemic when, according to New York Times journalist Rory Smith, the uncertainties of pandemic life drove people to seek explanations from the Internet. When asked about the theories, Gates has remarked that some people are tempted by the "simple explanation" that an evil person rather than biological factors are to blame, and that he does not know for what purpose anyone believes he would want to track them with microchips.

=== Religious views ===
In an interview with Rolling Stone, Gates said in regard to his faith: "The moral systems of religion, I think, are super important. We've raised our kids in a religious way; they've gone to the Catholic church that Melinda goes to and I participate in. I've been very lucky, and therefore I owe it to try and reduce the inequity in the world. And that's kind of a religious belief. I mean, it's at least a moral belief." In the same 2014 interview he also said: "I agree with people like Richard Dawkins that mankind felt the need for creation myths. Before we really began to understand disease and the weather and things like that, we sought false explanations for them. Now science has filled in some of the realm – not all – that religion used to fill. But the mystery and the beauty of the world is overwhelmingly amazing, and there's no scientific explanation of how it came about. To say that it was generated by random numbers, that does seem, you know, sort of an uncharitable view [laughs]. I think it makes sense to believe in God, but exactly what decision in your life you make differently because of it, I don't know."

=== Wealth ===
When Microsoft went public in 1986, Gates retained 44.9% ownership of the company. In 1987, he was listed as a billionaire in Forbes magazine's first America's richest issue; Gates was the world's youngest-ever self-made billionaire, with a net worth of $1.25 billion. Since then, he has been featured on The World's Billionaires list and was ranked as the richest person in 1995, 1996, 1998–2007, and 2009, maintaining the position until 2018, when Jeff Bezos surpassed his wealth. Gates was ranked first on the Forbes 400 list of wealthiest Americans from 1993 to 2007, in 2009, and from 2014 to 2017. According to Forbes, as of November 2026, Gates' estimated net worth stood at US$121.2 billion, making him the 17th-wealthiest individual in the world.

Gates's wealth briefly surpassed US$100 billion in 1999, making him the first person to reach this net worth. After 2000, the nominal value of his Microsoft holdings declined, partly because of the decline in Microsoft's stock price after the dot-com bubble burst, and partly because of the multi-billion dollar donations he had made to his charitable foundations. In May 2006, Gates remarked that he wished that he was not the richest man in the world, because he disliked the attention that it brought. In March 2010, Gates was the second wealthiest person after Carlos Slim, but regained the top position in 2013, according to the Bloomberg Billionaires Index. Slim regained the position again in June 2014 (but then lost the top position back to Gates). Between 2009 and 2014, his wealth doubled from US$40 billion to US$82 billion. In October 2017, Gates was surpassed by Amazon founder Jeff Bezos as the richest person in the world. In the Forbes 400 list of wealthiest Americans in 2023, he was ranked sixth with a wealth of $115.0 billion. He once again became the richest person in the world in November 2019 after a 48% increase in Microsoft shares, surpassing Bezos. Gates told the BBC, "I've paid more tax than any individual ever, and gladly so ... I've paid over $6 billion in taxes." He is a proponent of higher taxes, particularly for the rich.

Gates has several investments outside Microsoft, which in 2006 paid him a salary of US$616,667 and a bonus of US$350,000, for a total of US$966,667. In 1989, he founded Corbis, a digital imaging company. In 2004, he became a board member of Berkshire Hathaway, the investment company headed by long-time friend Warren Buffett. Buffet and Gates met with Chuck Feeney who gave away his fortune at lifetime.

== Connection with Jeffrey Epstein ==
Gates and financier Jeffrey Epstein were acknowledged to have first met in 1992, but would only start to have more frequent contact later on. A 2019 New York Times article reported that Gates's relationship with Epstein started in 2011, a few years after Epstein was convicted for procuring a child for prostitution, and continued for some years, including a visit to Epstein's house with his wife in the fall of 2013, despite her declared discomfort. Gates said in 2011 about Epstein: "His lifestyle is very different and kind of intriguing although it would not work for me".

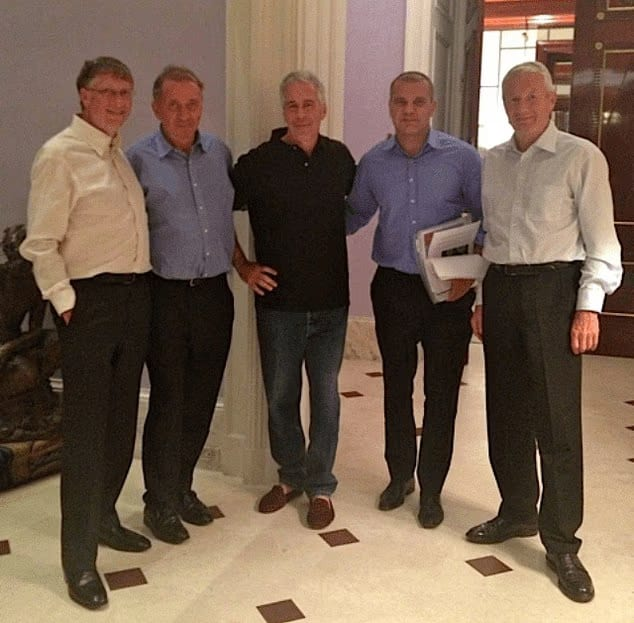
Gates (left) with Jeffrey Epstein (center) in 2018

The depth of the friendship between Gates and Epstein is unclear though Gates generally commented that "I met him. I didn't have any business relationship or friendship with him". However, Gates visited Epstein "many times, despite [Epstein's] past". It was reported that Epstein and Gates "discussed the Gates Foundation and philanthropy". Gates stated "Every meeting where I was with him were meetings with men. I was never at any parties or anything like that. He never donated any money to anything that I know about." In August 2021, Gates said the reason he had meetings with Epstein was because Gates hoped Epstein could provide money for philanthropic work, though nothing came of the idea. Gates added, "It was a huge mistake to spend time with him, to give him the credibility of being there." According to a fact check published by Reuters in 2020, Gates appears in the flight logs for the Lolita Express once in 2013, and there is no record of him ever travelling to Little Saint James.

It has also been reported that Epstein and Gates met with Nobel Committee chair Thorbjørn Jagland at his residence in Strasbourg, France, in March 2013 to discuss the Nobel Prize. Also in attendance were representatives of the International Peace Institute which has received millions in grants from the Gates Foundation, including a $2.5 million "community engagement" grant in October 2013. In 2023, it was reported that Epstein threatened to expose an alleged affair Gates had with a Russian bridge player.

In December 2025, Gates appeared in two photos released by the House Oversight and Government Reform Committee from documents in Jeffrey Epstein's estate. These photos were part of thousands of other files ordered to be released pursuant to the Epstein Files Transparency Act.

In January 2026, unsealed Epstein files revealed two 2013 draft emails by Epstein alleging Gates' extramarital affairs with "Russian girls" and "married women", resulting in him contracting an STD, and that an associate secretly obtained antibiotics for Melinda Gates while facilitating encounters. The emails accused Gates of ending their friendship after a failed Gates Foundation–JPMorgan deal and mentioned Epstein's resignation amid marital disputes and inappropriate activities. Unclear if sent and uncorroborated, the allegations were denied by Gates' spokesperson as "absolutely absurd and completely false", stemming from Epstein's frustration and efforts to "entrap and defame". It was also revealed that the emails by Epstein which involved discussion about Gates possibly contracting an STD and in need of antibiotics were in fact written on behalf of Boris Nikolić, an aggrieved employee of Gates who served as the Gates Foundation's chief advisor of science and technology, and was also planning to resign. Nikolic resigned from the Gates Foundation in 2014, and would also go on to serve as an executor to Epstein's estate.

On June 10, 2026, Gates sat for a voluntary closed-door transcribed interview with the House Oversight and Government Reform Committee as part of its investigation into Epstein. The committee released the full transcript on June 23, 2026, alongside that of Epstein's former executive assistant Lesley Groff.

In an opening statement, Gates said he had been introduced to Epstein in 2011 by colleagues he trusted, on the basis that Epstein could raise billions of dollars for global health from his clients. He described three meetings in 2011 and two in 2012, followed by more extensive discussions in 2013 and 2014 about potential giving structures, and said the contacts ended in December 2014 after a group Epstein had assembled proved to be a "dead end"; no fund was established and no money was raised. Gates called meeting Epstein "a grave error in judgment", said "I should never have met with Epstein in the first place", and stated: "I never witnessed nor had any indication that Epstein was engaged in ongoing criminal conduct. I never went to his island, his ranch, or his Florida home. I have never victimized anyone." He added that "while he may have sought to foster a personal relationship, I was never interested in that and never reciprocated."

Gates testified that he had declined repeated invitations to visit Little Saint James, saying it "wasn't the kind of relationship we had". Asked by Representative Robert Garcia, who noted that some of Epstein's employees had themselves been abused, Gates said he had never knowingly spent time with victims but acknowledged, "I may have been in the presence of victims." He said Epstein had learned of two of his extramarital affairs and sought to use that knowledge to pressure him into resuming contact, but stated "I was not blackmailed", describing Epstein's 2013 notes as draft emails Epstein wrote to himself. He denied the claims in those notes, saying "I never had an STD". A spokesperson for Gates said he "answered every question asked of him during the nearly six-hour interview".

In July 2026, Warren Buffett, who contributed $48 billion to the Gates Foundation from 2006 to 2025 and was also previously one of the foundation's founding trustees, did not donate to the Gates Foundation in 2026, waiting for the conclusion of a review on the ties between Gates and Epstein.

== Awards and recognition ==
Bill and Melinda Gates being awarded the Presidential Medal of Freedom by then President Barack Obama in 2016

- Time magazine listed Gates as one of the 100 most influential people of the 20th century in 1999, as well as one of the 100 most influential people in 2004, 2005, and 2006 respectively.
- Time also collectively named Gates, his wife Melinda and U2's lead singer Bono as the 2005 Persons of the Year for their humanitarian efforts. In 2006, he was voted eighth in the list of "Heroes of our time" published by New Statesman.
- Gates was listed in the Sunday Times power list in 1999, named CEO of the year by Chief Executive Officers magazine in 1994, ranked number one in the "Top 50 Cyber Elite" by Time in 1998, ranked number two in the Upside Elite 100 in 1999, and was also included in The Guardian as one of the "Top 100 influential people in media" in 2001.
- Gates has received honorary doctorates from Nyenrode Business Universiteit (1996), KTH Royal Institute of Technology (2002), Waseda University (2005), Tsinghua University (2007), Harvard University (2007), the Karolinska Institute (2007), the University of Cambridge (2009), and Northern Arizona University (2023). He was also made an honorary trustee of Peking University in 2007.
- In 1994, he was honored as the 20th Distinguished Fellow of the British Computer Society (DFBCS). In 1999, Gates received New York Institute of Technology's President's Medal.
- Gates was elected a Member of the US National Academy of Engineering in 1996 "for contributions to the founding and development of personal computing".
- Entomologists named Bill Gates' flower fly, Eristalis gatesi, in his honor in 1997.
- He was awarded American Library Association Honorary Membership in 1998.
- In 2002, Bill and Melinda Gates received the Jefferson Award for Greatest Public Service Benefiting the Disadvantaged.
- Gates was made an Honorary Knight Commander of the Order of the British Empire (KBE) by Queen Elizabeth II in 2005.
- He was given the 2006 James C. Morgan Global Humanitarian Award from the Tech Awards.
- In January 2006, he was awarded the Grand Cross of the Order of Prince Henry by the then president of Portugal, Jorge Sampaio.
- In November 2006, he was awarded the Placard of the Order of the Aztec Eagle, together with his wife Melinda who was awarded the Insignia of the same order, both for their philanthropic work around the world in the areas of health and education, particularly in Mexico, and specifically in the program "Un país de lectores".
- Gates received the 2010 Bower Award for Business Leadership from The Franklin Institute for his achievements at Microsoft and his philanthropic work.
- Also in 2010, he was honored with the Silver Buffalo Award by the Boy Scouts of America, its highest award for adults, for his service to youth.
- According to Forbes, Gates was ranked as the fourth most powerful person in the world in 2012, up from fifth in 2011.
- In 2015, Gates and his wife Melinda received the Padma Bhushan, India's third-highest civilian award for their social work in the country.
- In 2016, Barack Obama honored Bill and Melinda Gates with the Presidential Medal of Freedom for their philanthropic efforts.
- In 2017, François Hollande awarded Bill and Melinda Gates with France's highest national order, as Commanders in the Legion of Honour, for their charity efforts.
- He was elected a foreign member of the Chinese Academy of Engineering in 2017.
- In 2019, Gates was awarded the Professor Hawking Fellowship of the Cambridge Union in the University of Cambridge.
- In 2020, Gates received the Grand Cordon of the Order of the Rising Sun for his contributions to Japan and the world in regard to worldwide technological transformation and advancement of global health.
- In 2021, Gates was nominated at the 11th annual Streamy Awards for the crossover for his personal YouTube channel.
- In 2022, Gates received the Hilal-e-Pakistan, the second-highest civilian award in Pakistan for his social work in the country.
- In June 2025, Ethiopian prime minister Abiy Ahmed Ali conferred the national honour of Ethiopian Special Order on Bill Gates.
- In June 2025, Nigerian president Bola Ahmed Tinubu conferred the national honour of Commander of the Order of the Federal Republic on Bill Gates.

== In popular culture ==
=== Documentary films about Gates ===
External videos
- The Machine That Changed The World; Interview with Bill Gates, 1990 (raw video), 44:03, Open Vault WGBH

- The Machine That Changed the World (1990)
- Triumph of the Nerds (1996)
- Nerds 2.0.1 (1998)
- Waiting for "Superman" (2010)
- The Virtual Revolution (2010)
- Inside Bill's Brain: Decoding Bill Gates (2019)
- What's Next? The Future with Bill Gates (2024)

=== Feature films ===
- 1999: Pirates of Silicon Valley, a film that chronicles the rise of Apple and Microsoft from the early 1970s to 1997. Gates is portrayed by Anthony Michael Hall.
- 2002: Nothing So Strange, a mockumentary featuring Gates as the subject of a modern assassination. Gates briefly appears at the start, played by Steve Sires.
- 2010: The Social Network, a film that chronicles the development of Facebook. Gates is portrayed by Steve Sires.
- 2015: Steve Jobs vs. Bill Gates: The Competition to Control the Personal Computer, 1974–1999: Original film from the National Geographic Channel for the American Genius series.

=== Video and film clips ===
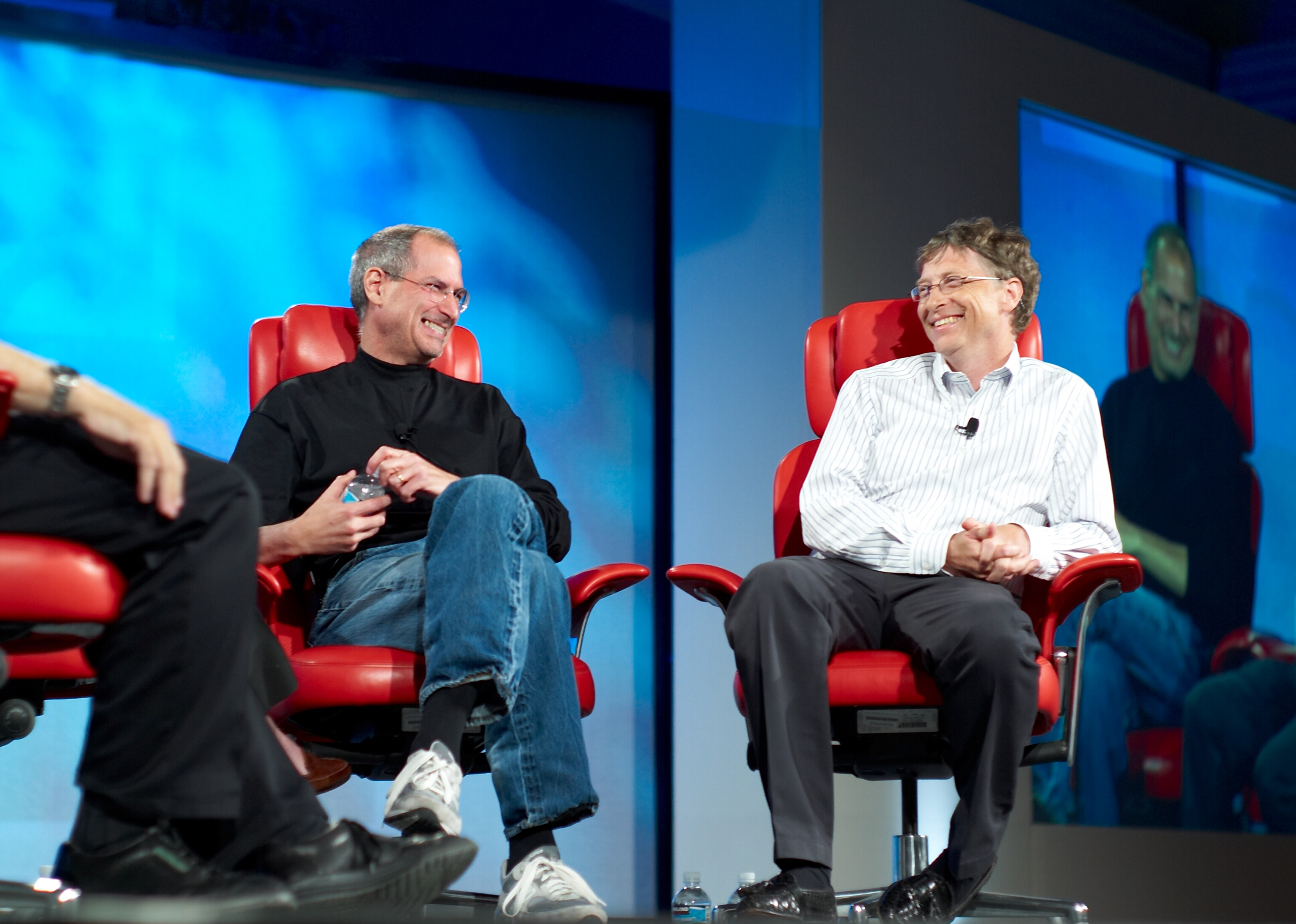
With Steve Jobs at D: All Things Digital in 2007

- 1983: Steve Jobs hosts Gates and others in the "Macintosh dating game" at the Macintosh pre-launch event (a parody of the television game show The Dating Game)
- 1991: Gates spoke to the Berkeley Macintosh Users Group lively weekly Thursday night meeting with questions and answers in PSL Hall (renamed Pimentel Hall in 1994) at University of California, Berkeley
- 2007: Steve Jobs and Bill Gates Together at the D5 Conference on YouTube, All Things Digital
- Since 2009, Gates has given numerous TED talks on current concerns such as innovation, education and fighting global diseases

=== Radio ===
Gates was the guest on BBC Radio 4's Desert Island Discs on January 31, 2016, in which he talked about his relationships with his father and Steve Jobs, meeting Melinda Ann French, the start of Microsoft and some of his habits (for example reading The Economist "from cover to cover every week"). His choice of things to take on a desert island were, for music: "Blue Skies" by Willie Nelson; a book: The Better Angels of Our Nature by Steven Pinker; and luxury item: a DVD Collection of Lectures from The Teaching Company.

=== Television ===
Gates starred as himself in a brief appearance on the Frasier episode "The Two Hundredth Episode". He also made a guest appearance as himself on the TV show The Big Bang Theory, in an episode titled "The Gates Excitation". He also appeared in a cameo role in 2019 on the series finale of Silicon Valley. Gates was parodied in The Simpsons episode "Das Bus". In 2023, Gates was the interviewee in an episode of the Amol Rajan Interviews series on BBC Two, and was the subject of an episode of the UK Channel 4 series The Billionaires Who Made Our World. In 2025, he also made a guest appearance via video call in Hindi TV show Kyunki Saas Bhi Kabhi Bahu Thi 2.

== Works ==
In 1989, Gates wrote the foreword to the Microsoft Press book Learn BASIC Now, by Michael Halvorson and David Rygmyr, reflecting on the growth of the BASIC language and its use in most of the era's personal computers. He also sketched out plans for BASIC's use as a universal language to embellish or alter the performance of a range of software applications.

Gates has authored several books. The Road Ahead, co-authored with Microsoft executive Nathan Myhrvold and journalist Peter Rinearson, was published in November 1995. It summarized the implications of the personal computing revolution and described a future profoundly changed by the arrival of a global information superhighway. His second book, Business @ the Speed of Thought, co-authored with Collins Hemingway, was published in 1999, and discusses how business and technology are integrated, and shows how digital infrastructures and information networks can help to get an edge on the competition. In 2021 he published How to Avoid a Climate Disaster, which presents what Gates learned in over a decade of studying climate change and investing in innovations to address climate problems. Following the COVID-19 pandemic Gates published How to Prevent the Next Pandemic in 2022 which proposes a "Global Epidemic Response and Mobilization" (GERM) team with annual funding of $1 billion, under the auspices of the WHO.

The first of Gates's planned three memoirs, Source Code was published in February 2025.

- Gates, Bill (February 4, 2025). Source Code: My Beginnings. New York: Alfred A. Knopf. ISBN 978-0593801581. OCLC 1485475200.
- Schwab, Tim (September 19, 2024). The Bill Gates Problem (Paperback ed.). New York: Penguin. p. 496. ISBN 9780241609484.

== See also ==
- List of richest Americans in history
- OER Project – Project for global teaching of Big History

== Notes ==
Business positions
First	Chief Executive Officer of Microsoft; 1975–2000	Succeeded by Steve Ballmer
First	Chairman of Microsoft; 1975–2014	Succeeded by John W. Thompson
Honorary titles
Preceded by Warren Buffett	World's richest person 1996	Succeeded by Hassanal Bolkiah
Preceded by Hassanal Bolkiah	World's richest person 1998–2007	Succeeded by Warren Buffett
Preceded by Warren Buffett	World's richest person 2009	Succeeded by Carlos Slim
Preceded by Carlos Slim	World's richest person 2014–2017	Succeeded by Jeff Bezos
