= EarthNow =

EarthNow is a Seattle-based startup company aiming to blanket the Earth with live satellite video coverage, initially aiming to provide services to governments and large-enterprise customers.

The company was founded in 2017 and has backers including Bill Gates, SoftBank, Intellectual Ventures, Airbus, and OneWeb founder Greg Wyler.

The satellite network is to be deployed as a constellation of up to 500 of 230 kilograms (500 lb) satellites in low Earth orbit (LEO).

Manufacturing is expected to be done in Florida and Toulouse, France in partnership with Airbus.

The intent is to provide a "'live and unfiltered' video stream that will be used to monitor illegal fishing, detect natural disasters," monitor migrating whales, observing war zones, on-demand data on crop health, and whatever uses people put on them.
