= Source Code (memoir) =

2025 book by Bill Gates

Source Code: My Beginnings
- Author: Bill Gates
- Language: English
- Genre: Memoir
- Publisher: Penguin Random House
- Publication date: February 1, 2025
- Publication place: United States
- Media type: Book
- Pages: 336
- ISBN: 978-0593801581

Source Code: My Beginnings is a memoir by Bill Gates. The book covers his early life and the foundation of Microsoft, ending in the late 1970s when Microsoft signed their first deal with Apple. It is the first of three planned memoirs by Gates. The second will cover his years at Microsoft and the third his philanthropy. It was published by Penguin's imprints Alfred A. Knopf in the United States and Allen Lane in the United Kingdom.

== Reception ==
Several reviewers noted Gates’s penchant for self-deprecation and his ability to humanize his success. Writing for The Guardian, Steven Poole remarked that Gates conveyed humility, in contrast to other tech titans. Poole wrote: "There is a sense of the writer, older and wiser, trying to redeem the past through understanding it better." David Shaywitz of The Wall Street Journal also praised Gates’s candidness, writing that the reader is "treated to an unexpectedly revealing account". In The New York Times, Jennifer Szalai liked the description of Gates's youth but found that not much happened in many parts of the memoir: "Source Code contains plenty of nicely rendered details, but as far as narrative tension goes, for the first 50 pages or so there is hardly any." She wrote that Gates might have to grapple with more difficult reflections on his later years in his two upcoming memoirs.
