= Personal service corporation =

A personal service corporation is a company which, as the name suggests, provides personal services. These services span a wide variety of endeavors in many fields, and are specified for tax purposes in the United States by the Internal Revenue Service (IRS). This type of corporation has some tax advantages, such as various tax-free fringe benefits, limited liability, and business deductions. For a corporation to be considered a personal service corporation by the IRS, the employee/owner must perform at least 20% of the personal services themselves, and must also own at least 10% of the outstanding stock in the testing period. An income test requires that employees must spend at least 95% of their work time on qualified services.

== Details ==
In United States tax law, a corporation is a personal service corporation if it meets all of the following requirements:

1. Its principal activity during the “testing period” is performing personal services (defined later). Generally, the testing period for any tax year is the prior tax year. If the corporation has just been formed, the testing period begins on the first day of its tax year and ends on the earlier of:

a. The last day of its tax year, or

b. The last day of the calendar year in which its tax year begins.

2. Its employee-owners substantially perform the services in (1). This requirement is met if more than 20% of the corporation's compensation cost for its activities of performing personal services during the testing period is for personal services performed by employee-owners.

3. Its employee-owners own more than 10% of the fair market value of its outstanding stock on the last day of the testing period.

Personal services include any activity performed in the fields of accounting, actuarial science, architecture, consulting, engineering, health (including veterinary services), law, and the performing arts.

A person is an employee-owner of a personal service corporation if both of the following apply:

1. They are an employee of the corporation or perform personal services for, or on behalf of, the corporation (even if they are an independent contractor for other purposes) on any day of the testing period

2. They own stock in the corporation at any time during the testing period.
