= Top Chef: Kentucky =

Season 16 of American television series

- Season 16
- Hosted by: Padma Lakshmi
- Judges: Tom Colicchio; Graham Elliot; Nilou Motamed
- No. of contestants: 18
- Winner: Kelsey Barnard Clark
- Runner-up: Sara Bradley
- Location: Louisville and Lexington, Kentucky; Nashville, Tennessee
- Finals venue: Macau
- Fan Favorite: Kelsey Barnard Clark
- No. of episodes: 15

Release
- Original network: Bravo
- Original release: December 6, 2018 – March 14, 2019

Season chronology
- ← Previous; Colorado Next → All-Stars L.A.

Top Chef: Kentucky is the sixteenth season of the American reality television series Top Chef. Initial details about the season and its cast were revealed on October 18, 2018. The competition was filmed at various locations in Kentucky, including Louisville, Lexington, and Lake Cumberland, with an additional episode set in Nashville, Tennessee. The season finale took place in Macau. Padma Lakshmi returned as host, with Tom Colicchio, Graham Elliot, and Nilou Motamed forming the judging panel. Due to being on maternity leave for the majority of filming, Top Chef regular Gail Simmons did not appear as one of the main judges for the season. Top Chef: Kentucky premiered on December 6, 2018, and concluded on March 14, 2019. In the season finale, Kelsey Barnard Clark was declared the winner over runner-up Sara Bradley. Barnard Clark was also voted Fan Favorite.

== Contestants ==
Fifteen chefs competed in Top Chef: Kentucky. In addition, like the previous season, three returning competitors competed in the Last Chance Kitchen to earn the chance to join the competition: Top Chef: Colorado contestants Carrie Baird and Brother Luck, and Top Chef: Charleston contestant Jim Smith. Following the sixth episode of Last Chance Kitchen, Luck was selected to join the main cast.

=== New contestants ===
Name	Current Residence (Note: The contestants' city and state of residence during time of filming.)
Eric Adjepong	Washington, D.C.
Sara Bradley	Paducah, Kentucky
Kelsey Barnard Clark	Dothan, Alabama
Edmund "Eddie" Konrad	Philadelphia, Pennsylvania
Pablo Lamon	Miami Beach, Florida
Natalie Maronski	Philadelphia, Pennsylvania
Michelle Minori	San Francisco, California
Nini Nguyen	Brooklyn, New York
Brandon Rosen	San Mateo, California
Kevin Scharpf	Dubuque, Iowa
Caitlin Steininger	Cincinnati, Ohio
Justin Sutherland	St. Paul, Minnesota
David Viana	Asbury Park, New Jersey
Adrienne Wright	Boston, Massachusetts
Brian Young	Boston, Massachusetts

Eric Adjepong and Nini Nguyen returned to compete in Top Chef: All-Stars L.A. Sara Bradley returned for Top Chef: World All-Stars.

=== Returning contestants ===
Name	Current Residence	Season
Carrie Baird	Denver, Colorado	Season 15
Brother Luck	Colorado Springs, Colorado	Season 15
Jim Smith	Montgomery, Alabama	Season 14

== Contestant progress ==
Episode #		1	2	3	4	5	6	7	8	9	10	11	12	13	14	15
Quickfire Challenge Winner(s)		Justin^{1} Pablo^{1} Sara^{1}	David	David	Michelle		N/A	Justin	N/A	Adrienne^{1}	Eddie	Sara^{1}	Justin^{1}	Michelle^{1}	Michelle^{1}	N/A
Contestant		Elimination Challenge Results														
1	Kelsey	IN	IN	HIGH	LOW		HIGH	IN	WIN	LOW	IN	LOW	IN	WIN	LOW	WINNER
2	Sara	IN	HIGH	IN	LOW		LOW	LOW	HIGH	HIGH	LOW	HIGH	WIN	LOW	WIN	RUNNER-UP
3	Eric	IN	IN	IN	HIGH		WIN	IN	HIGH	IN	WIN	WIN	IN	LOW	LOW	OUT
4	Michelle	IN	IN	IN	LOW		IN	IN	LOW	WIN	OUT		IN^{5}	HIGH	OUT	
5	Adrienne	LOW	HIGH	IN	HIGH		IN	HIGH	LOW	IN	HIGH	LOW	LOW	OUT		
6	Justin	IN	IN	IN	LOW		IN	HIGH	HIGH	HIGH^{3}	HIGH	LOW	OUT			
7	Eddie	IN	IN	HIGH	HIGH		HIGH	WIN	LOW	LOW	IN^{4}	OUT				
8	David	HIGH	HIGH	IN	LOW		IN	IN	LOW	OUT						
9	Brian	IN	IN	LOW	WIN		LOW	LOW	OUT							
10	Brandon	IN	LOW	IN	LOW		IN	OUT								
11	Brother						OUT^{2}									
12	Nini	IN	WIN	WIN	OUT											
12	Pablo	HIGH	LOW	LOW	OUT											
14	Kevin	LOW	HIGH	OUT												
15	Natalie	WIN	OUT													
16	Caitlin	OUT														

^Note 1: The chef(s) did not receive immunity for winning the Quickfire Challenge.
^Note 2: Following Episode 6 of Last Chance Kitchen, Brother was introduced as a regular competitor.
^Note 3: Despite Justin making one of the judge's favourite dishes, he did not plate a sufficient number of dishes and was thus ineligible to win.
^Note 4: As a reward for winning the Quickfire Challenge, Eddie did not have to compete in the Elimination Challenge.
^Note 5: Michelle won Last Chance Kitchen and returned to the competition.

(WINNER) The chef won the season and was crowned "Top Chef".
(RUNNER-UP) The chef was the runner-up for the season.
(WIN) The chef won the Elimination Challenge.
(HIGH) The chef was selected as one of the top entries in the Elimination Challenge, but did not win.
(IN) The chef was not selected as one of the top or bottom entries in the Elimination Challenge and was safe.
(LOW) The chef was selected as one of the bottom entries in the Elimination Challenge, but was not eliminated.
(OUT) The chef lost the Elimination Challenge.

== Episodes ==
No. overall	No. in season	Title	Original release date	US viewers (millions)
232	1	"The Fastest Two Minutes in Cooking"	December 6, 2018	0.83
Quickfire Challenge: At Churchill Downs, the chefs, working in teams of three, were allotted two minutes to prep the ingredients for their dishes, in reference to the Kentucky Derby and its reputation as "The Fastest Two Minutes in Sports." After two minutes, the contestants' knives were confiscated. The teams then had 20 minutes to complete their dishes. The winners each received two VIP tickets to the 2019 Kentucky Derby.: Winners: Justin, Pablo, Sara (Beet Pickled Poached Egg, Beef Fat Roasted Carrots, Roasted Corn, Mint & Carrot Top); Elimination Challenge: The chefs hosted a Kentucky Derby-themed party. Remaining in the same groups as the Quickfire Challenge, the contestants competed head-to-head against their own teammates. The chefs with the best dishes within their groups were eligible to win the challenge, while the worst ones were put up for elimination. The guest judge for the challenge was Churchill Downs' executive chef, David Danielson.: Winner: Natalie (Halibut Ceviche with Pickled Bell Peppers, Confit Potatoes & Laksa Curry); Eliminated: Caitlin (Tomato Cobbler with Salt & Pepper Biscuits & Homemade Ricotta)
233	2	"Bourbon, Barrels and Burgoo"	December 13, 2018	0.70
Quickfire Challenge: The chefs were given 30 minutes to create dishes inspired by Gail Simmons' pregnancy cravings. The prepped ingredients for the top two dishes were then delivered to Gail in New York, where she cooked the meals herself and determined the winner. The winner received immunity from elimination.: Winner: David (Ribeye with Corn Chermoula & Harissa Red Wine Reduction); Elimination Challenge: The chefs visited the Maker's Mark distillery. After their tour, the contestants were separated in two teams and challenged to put their own spin on classic Kentucky cuisine, such as burgoo, mutton, benedictine, spoonbread, and hoecakes. The winner received US$10,000. The guest judge for the challenge was Maker's Mark's in-house chef, Newman Miller.: Winner: Nini (Spoonbread with Shrimp Étouffée Sauce); Eliminated: Natalie (Meyer Lemon Curd Pie with Mascarpone & Bourbon Glaze)
234	3	"Naughty and Nice"	December 20, 2018	0.87
Quickfire Challenge: In a holiday-themed challenge, the chefs were given two minutes to shop in the pantry, placing their ingredients inside their assigned gift boxes. Once time expired, the contestants participated in a white elephant gift exchange, forcing them to conceptualize festive dishes using other people's ingredients. The winner received immunity from elimination. The guest judges for the challenge were Top Chef: Charleston winner Brooke Williamson and Top Chef: All-Stars winner Richard Blais.: Winner: David (Leek Carbonara with Pancetta & Morels); Elimination Challenge: The chefs enjoyed a feast in celebration of le Réveillon de Noël, a traditional French Christmas dinner. Afterwards, each chef was responsible for creating one of the thirteen desserts required to end the meal. The guest judge for the challenge was chef Éric Ripert.: Winner: Nini (Blackberry & Lemon Vacherin); Eliminated: Kevin (Ricotta Cake with Ricotta Whipped Cream & Macerated Cherries)
235	4	"Surprise...It's Restaurant Wars"	December 27, 2018	0.96
Quickfire Challenge: The chefs were tasked with creating an amuse-bouche. They were provided three options for plating, available on a first-come, first-served basis: a saucer, a ramekin, or a Chinese spoon. The winner received immunity from elimination. The guest judges for the challenge were Top Chef: New Orleans runner-up Nina Compton and Top Chef: California contestant Karen Akunowicz.: Winner: Michelle (Halibut Ceviche with Compressed Watermelon & Salsa Water); Elimination Challenge (Part 1): In a twist, the series' traditional Restaurant Wars challenge arrived early, instead of the halfway point in the competition. The contestants were also split into three teams, instead of two, based on the plating option they selected during the Quickfire Challenge. Per the usual rules, each team was responsible for transforming an empty space into a fully functioning pop-up restaurant. The guest judge for the challenge was restaurateur Caroline Styne.: Third Coast: David, Kelsey, Justin (EC), Nini (FOH); First Course: Crawfish Bisque with Trinity, Lemon Zest & Scalli (Justin); Chargrilled Chesapeake Bay Oysters with Compound Butter (Team); Second Course: Red Snapper Pontchartrain, Corn & Crab Salad, Fried Green Tomatoes with Salsa Verde (Team); Creole Spiced Duck with Cabbage (David); Third Course: Buttermilk Panna Cotta with Blackberries & Buttermilk Biscuit (Kelsey); "Chocolate" Cocoa Nib Sorbet, Chocolate Crumble & Chocolate Ganache (Nini); Thistle: Brandon, Michelle (EC), Pablo, Sara (FOH); First Course: Green Tomato Gazpacho, Sourdough Croutons, Cucumber & Ginger (Sara); Sweet Pea Agnolotti, Roasted Shiitakes, Toasted Hazelnut, Manchego & Ricotta (Michelle); Second Course: Seared Scallops with Sunchoke, Apple Purée & Lime (Pablo); Kombu Braised Short Rib with Artichoke, Asparagus, Fava Beans & Carrot (Team); Third Course: Soy Milk Custard with Strawberries, Cardamom, Almond Streusel & Lemon Verbena (Brandon); Goat Cheese Roulade with Corn, Blueberries & Candy Corn (Brandon); North East: Adrienne (EC), Brian (FOH), Eddie, Eric; First Course: Chicken Ballotine with Sunchoke, Sunflower Seeds & Apple (Brian); Striped Bass Crudo with Corn Dashi, Corn Purée & Shaved Celery (Eddie); Second Course: NY Strip with Braised Cabbage & Merlot Jus (Eddie); Pork & Scallop with Couscous & Carrot (Eric); Third Course: Marsala Roasted Peach, Yogurt Mousse, Hazelnut Crumble, Fresh Peaches & Mint (Adrienne); Jasper Hill Farm Harbison Cheese with Basil Focaccia & Blackberry (Adrienne)
236	5	"Restaurant Wars Part 2"	January 3, 2019	1.13
Elimination Challenge (Part 2): Continuing from the previous episode, the chefs served their meals and the results of Restaurant Wars were revealed. While an individual winner was declared, each member of the winning team received US$10,000. Two chefs were asked to leave the competition in a double-elimination.: Winning Team: North East; Winner: Brian; Eliminated: Nini, Pablo
237	6	"Roaring Munchies"	January 10, 2019	0.98
Elimination Challenge: The winner of Episode 6 of Last Chance Kitchen, Brother Luck, joined the competition. The chefs were then instructed to make canapés inspired by the flavors of Prohibition-era cocktails for a Roaring Twenties-style party, including the gin rickey, Southside Fizz, Old Fashioned, Last Word, whiskey sour, and Twelve-Mile Limit. As a reward for winning the Last Chance Kitchen team challenge, Adrienne, Brother, Brian, Eddie, Kelsey, and Sara were given first choice of cocktails. The party was held at the Seelbach Hotel's Rathskeller room. The guest judge for the challenge was chef Ken Oringer.: Winner: Eric (Oyster with Rum/Bourbon Mignonette, Grenadine Nage Floater & Pumpernickel); Eliminated: Brother (Chicken Salad with Cucumber, Peanut Sauce, Beef Liver Mousse, Fresno Chiles & Basil, Cilantro, Mint)
238	7	"Carne!"	January 17, 2019	1.02
Quickfire Challenge: The chefs reimagined the Hot Brown; per the rules, their dishes had to include turkey, a sauce, and be plated in a skillet. The winner received immunity from elimination. The guest judge for the challenge was actress Lena Waithe.: Winner: Justin ("Kentucky Fried Breakfast Brown": Smoked Gouda, Maple Mornay, Fried Turkey Breast over Grilled Bread); Elimination Challenge: The chefs were asked to create dishes using different cuts of beef and locally-sourced Kentucky ingredients. Cuts were assigned to the contestants via random knife draw. The guest judges for the challenge were chef Nancy Silverton and butcher Dario Cecchini. The winner received a signed apron from Cecchini and the opportunity to stage at his butcher shop, Antica Macelleria Cecchini, in Tuscany, Italy, for a week.: Winner: Eddie ("Golumpki": Brisket Stuffed Romaine with Ragu, Beet & Berry Sauce); Eliminated: Brandon (Asian Style Beef Tartare with Miso Egg Sauce, Black Raspberries, Crispy Potatoes & Asparagus)
239	8	"Whatever Floats Your Boat"	January 24, 2019	0.98
Elimination Challenge: The chefs, separated into two teams, threw competing houseboat parties on Lake Cumberland for 100 guests. The guests then voted for their favorite party to determine the winner. The guest judge for the challenge was chef Emeril Lagasse.: Winner: Kelsey (Oysters with Cocktail Sauce, Lemon Juice, Hot Sauce, Horseradish & Pickled Watermelon Rind; "Key Lime Crunch": Cereal with White Chocolate, Coconut, Banana & Key Lime); Eliminated: Brian (South Pacific Style Porchetta with Papaya, Peanut & Cilantro Salad)
240	9	"Music City USA"	January 31, 2019	1.03
Quickfire Challenge: The chefs traveled to the Grand Ole Opry in Nashville, Tennessee, where they created dishes which satisfied the requests on their provided breakfast, lunch, and dinner riders. The winner received an advantage in the following Elimination Challenge. The guest judge for the challenge was country music singer Hunter Hayes.: Winner: Adrienne (Seared Filet Mignon with Cajun Spiced Corn, Roasted Pepper Purée & Fennel Salad); Elimination Challenge: The chefs made dishes inspired by their favorite music memories. As a reward for winning the Quickfire Challenge, Adrienne was given an extra hour of cooking time. The guest judge for the challenge was chef Jonathan Waxman.: Winner: Michelle (Red Snapper with Corn & Fava Ragout, Citrus Vinaigrette & Fennel Onion Purée); Eliminated: David ("Porks and Clams": Morels, Clam Salad, Crispy Potatoes & Pork Tenderloin); Note: At the end of the episode, the show paid tribute to the memory of Top Chef: Colorado contestant and Fan Favorite award recipient Fatima Ali, who died on January 25, 2019, after battling cancer.
241	10	"Hoop Dreams"	February 7, 2019	0.93
Quickfire Challenge: The chefs returned to Kentucky and participated in a trivia challenge. The contestants had to work together to solve four riddles, each of which would lead them to an ingredient or kitchen tool with a number displayed on it. The four numbers were required to open the combination lock to a box containing bouillon cubes. Once the box was unlocked, the chefs had to make dishes using the bouillon cubes as their only seasoning. The winner received the distinct advantage of sitting out of the following Elimination Challenge, thus automatically advancing to the next round. The guest judge for the challenge was Top Chef: Texas contestant Edward Lee.: Winner: Eddie (Gold Caponata with Mint & Poached Bay Scallops, Chicken & Vegetable Bouillon); Elimination Challenge: The chefs, separated in two teams, competed in a head-to-head cook-off inside Rupp Arena. The first team to win two out of three rounds won the challenge. While an individual winner was declared, each member of the winning team received US$5,000. The guest judges for the challenge were Edward Lee, Food & Wine editor-in-chief Hunter Lewis, and University of Kentucky basketball coach John Calipari.: Winner: Eric (Tamarind Glazed Drumette with Herb Confetti); Eliminated: Michelle (Sweet & Sour Ribs, "Thunder & Lightning" Cucumbers with Peach & Calabrian Chili Sauce)
242	11	"The Greatest"	February 14, 2019	0.98
Quickfire Challenge: The chefs had to cook fried chicken using their own spice blends; however, in order to obtain their spices, the contestants first had to correctly identify them through a blindfolded taste test. The winner received US$5,000. Beginning with this challenge, immunity from elimination was no longer available as a reward. The guest judge for the challenge was chef Art Smith.: Winner: Sara (Fried Chicken with Corn & Blackberry Salad); Elimination Challenge: The chefs planned a progressive meal for a charity benefit at the Muhammad Ali Center in honor of professional boxer and philanthropist Muhammad Ali. Each chef was responsible for one of six courses, which were inspired by fights from Ali's boxing career: The Fight at Freedom Hall, Liston Two, Fight of the Century, Rumble in the Jungle, Thrilla in Manila, and The Battle of New Orleans. The guest judge for the challenge was professional boxer Laila Ali.: Winner: Eric ("Rumble in the Jungle": Fufu Plantain & Cassava Dumpling with Congolese Red Sauce); Eliminated: Eddie ("Fight of the Century": Brown Butter Roasted Chicken, Collard Green Purée, Red Wine Poultry Jus & Toasted Hazelnuts)
243	12	"Kentucky Farewell"	February 21, 2019	0.91
Quickfire Challenge: The winner of Last Chance Kitchen, Michelle, rejoined the cast. The chefs harvested their gardens, which were planted at the beginning of the competition, and were tasked with making garden-forward dishes. The winner received US$10,000. The guest judge for the challenge was chef Ouita Michel.: Winner: Justin (Radish Chard Salad, Scallion, Radish Top, Arugula Pistou, Roasted Turnips, Pickled Chard Stems & Dill); Elimination Challenge: For their last Elimination Challenge in Kentucky, the chefs visited the Keeneland Sales auction house. Upon arrival, the contestants were told to create dishes showing gratitude to their culinary mentors. They were then provided US$500 to bid on luxury ingredients for their dishes during an auction. The chefs had to remain conscious of their spending, however, as any ingredients needed for their dishes after the auction would have to be bought using their remaining funds. The winner received US$10,000. The guest judges for the challenge were Top Chef: Las Vegas finalist Bryan Voltaggio and chefs Ouita Michel, Gavin Kaysen, JD Fratzke, Kim Alter, David Posey, and Chris Coombs.: Winner: Sara (Olive Oil Poached Sea Bass, Iberico Ham Broth, Soy Beans, Black-Eyed Peas & Baby Lima Beans); Eliminated: Justin (Yellowtail Two Ways: Sashimi Style & Miso Cured)
244	13	"Holy Macau!"	February 28, 2019	0.96
Quickfire Challenge: The final five chefs traveled to Macau for the remainder of the competition and explored one of the local markets. They were then challenged to create dishes highlighting Macanese proteins, including gum fish, cuttlefish, eel, sea snails, giant scallops, and razor clams. The chefs were given MOP$200 to spend on any additional ingredients available at the market.: Winner: Michelle (Cuttlefish Noodles with Chinese Beans, Lotus Root & Fermented Black Beans); Elimination Challenge: The chefs catered a Chinese New Year party with dishes featuring pork products, in celebration of the Year of the Pig. They received assistance from five previously eliminated contestants (Justin, Eddie, David, Brian, and Brandon), who were each assigned a tray containing three unique ingredients: Justin had water chestnuts, coconuts, and lychees; Eddie had shrimp, cauliflower, and walnuts; David had peaches, noodles, and peanuts; Brian had eggs, broccoli, and ginger; and Brandon had cabbage, cashews, and oranges. Once a sous chef was selected by one of the competing chefs, their assigned ingredients would be off-limits to the other competitors. The dishes were required to incorporate all three ingredients as well. The guest judge for the challenge was chef Jowett Yu.: Winner: Kelsey (Mushroom Broth with Peas, Greens, Orange Rinds, Portuguese Sausage, Cashews, Cilantro & Chives); Eliminated: Adrienne (Fried Sticky Rice Cake, Hoisin Braised Pork Belly & Roasted Chili Aioli)
245	14	"The Tao of Macau"	March 7, 2019	0.94
Quickfire Challenge: The chefs created dishes highlighting durian. The guest judge for the challenge was chef Abe Conlon.: Winner: Michelle (Espuma of Chilled Durian, Ice, & Coconut Cream with Shrimp Ceviche & Molho Cru Sauce); Elimination Challenge: The chefs were challenged to make a dish fusing their own heritage with Chinese ingredients. They received a surprise visit from their family members, who helped them conceptualize their dishes and shop for ingredients. The guest judges for the challenge were chefs Abe Conlon and Manuela Ferreira, and chef consultant Florita Morais Alves.: Winner: Sara (Chicken Thighs with Matzo Balls & Savory Mushroom Consommé); Eliminated: Michelle ("Cioppino" Seafood, Beans, & Chorizo)
246	15	"Finale"	March 14, 2019	0.91
Elimination Challenge: The three remaining chefs, with the assistance of two sous chefs of their choosing (Brandon & Nini for Kelsey, Justin & Michelle for Eric, and David & Eddie for Sara) had to cook the best four-course meal of their lives. Two hours into prep, the contestants had to serve their first course for the judges, who selected one chef to be eliminated.: Eliminated: Eric (Caribbean Jerk Tartare & Lotus Root Chips); The following day, the final two chefs served their entire four-course meals. The guest judges were chefs Alvin Leung, Alexander Smalls, Melanie Hansche, May Chow, Dan Hong, and Mitsuharu Tsumura.: Kelsey: First Course: Cornbread & Buttermilk with Crawfish, Boiled Peanuts, Cucumber, and Watermelon; Second Course: French Oysters, Vichyssoise, Chinese Chives, Pickled Green Tomato & Cheese Straw; Third Course: Soft-Shell Crab & Field Peas with a Pistou Sauce; Fourth Course: Peach Cobbler; Sara: First Course: Chili Prawns with Boiled Peanuts; Second Course: Braised Bacon with Razor Clams, Baby Corn, & Pickled Peaches; Third Course: Roast Duck with Black-Eyed Peas & Pickled Beets; Fourth Course: Rib Eye Steak with Dirty Rice, Shiitake Broth & Maitake Mushroom Confit; Winner: Kelsey; Runner-up: Sara

== Last Chance Kitchen ==
No.	Title	Original air date
1	"Three Vets and a Newbie"	December 6, 2018
Challenge: The first eliminated chef and three Top Chef veterans had to create their best biscuits and gravy.: Brother: Buttermilk Biscuit & Chorizo Cheddar Fondue; Caitlin: Biscuit & Corn, Jalapeño Gravy with Harissa Roasted Tomatoes & Sunny Side Up Egg; Carrie: Broken Biscuit with Soft Scrambled Eggs & Mornay Sauce; Jim: Fried Buttermilk Biscuit with Cod Fish Gravy; Winner: Carrie; Eliminated: Caitlin
2	"When Life Gives You Lemon"	December 13, 2018
Challenge: The chefs were required to make lemon-forward dishes using only one lemon each.: Brother: Salmon Tartare with Lemon Fluid Gel & Melon Salad; Carrie: Pork Tenderloin with Grilled Lemon, Lemon Beurre Blanc & Arugula Salad; Jim: Salmon Crudo with Lemon & Brussels Sprouts Salad; Natalie: Grilled Asparagus, Brussels Sprouts & Peas with Burnt Miso & Lemon Sauce; Winner: Carrie; Eliminated: Jim
3	"Have Yourself a Merry Little Breakfast"	December 20, 2018
Challenge: The chefs cooked dishes for breakfast.: Brother: Frittata with Truffle, Asparagus, Tomato & Strawberry Salad with Ranch Ricotta; Carrie: Ranch Bacon & Potatoes with Blueberry Sausage, Soft Scrambled Eggs & Fancy Toast; Natalie: Omelette with Morel Mushrooms, Asparagus, Pancetta & Ranch Potato Pancake; Kevin: Ranch Waffles, Pancetta & Maple Compote with Seven Minute Egg; Winner: Natalie; Eliminated: Carrie
4	"Seafood Mis-En-Place Race"	December 27, 2018
Challenge: The chefs, working initially as a team, were given three mise en place tasks: deveining shrimp, shucking oysters, and breaking down a whole fish. They were not allowed to begin cooking until all tasks were completed.: Brother: Sea Bass with Arugula, Orange & Ginger Salad; Natalie: Poached Shrimp with Corn & Tomato; Kevin: Beer Battered Oysters with Shoyu Ponzu Sauce; Eliminated: Kevin
5	"Restaurant Wars Comes To LCK"	January 3, 2019
Challenge (Part 1): The chefs competed in a "mini-Restaurant Wars challenge." The contestants were instructed to create a restaurant concept and then produce a signature dish which exemplified it.: Brother ("Sun Blossom"): Tempura Jalapeño Popper; Natalie ("Not Quite Mom’s"): Pan Seared Scallops with Braised Napa Cabbage, Carrots, Asparagus & Mushroom Broth; Nini ("Delta"): Lemongrass Grilled Pork Chop with Corn & Tomato Salad; Pablo ("Campo"): Pan Seared Carrots with Herb Yogurt & Pickled Carrots; Eliminated: Natalie, Pablo
6	"One More Win And You're In"	January 3, 2019
Challenge (Part 2): The two remaining chefs expanded upon their restaurant concepts from the previous challenge. Each chef was responsible for creating a three-course meal, which included their dishes from the last round. They were also provided the assistance of five sous chefs, selected via random knife draw, consisting of the remaining cast from the main competition. Brother was assisted by Adrienne, Brian, Eddie, Kelsey, and Sara; Nini was assisted by Brandon, David, Eric, Justin, and Michelle. The winner of the challenge earned a spot in the main competition. In addition, the winning team received an advantage in the following Elimination Challenge.: Brother ("Sun Blossom"): First Course: Tempura Jalapeño Popper with Pickled Cucumber & Carrot Tsukemono; Second Course: Cumin Dusted Scallop with Yuzu Guacamole & Kumquat Gastrique; Third Course: Seared Tuna, Pico de Gallo with Cherry, Apple, Tomato, Cilantro with Beurre Blanc & Bonito Flakes; Nini ("Delta"): First Course: Po' Boy Shrimp with Fish Sauce Chili Glaze; Second Course: Lemongrass Pork Chop with Herb, Corn & Tomato Salad; Third Course: Tapioca Pudding with Bananas Fostered Bananas, Coconut Foam, Toasted Coconut & Peanuts; Winner: Brother
7	"The Twist"	January 10, 2019
Challenge: Following his swift elimination from the main competition, Brother opted out of competing any further. The previously eliminated contestants, minus the returning veterans, were given the opportunity to take his spot in Last Chance Kitchen. The chefs were allowed to cook any dish of their choosing. Colicchio then selected his favorite dish through a blind tasting.: Caitlin: Cincinnati Chili Spice Rubbed Steak & Mustard Sauce; Kevin: Salmorejo with Olive Salad; Natalie: Sea Bass with Whey Braised Napa Cabbage, Chicken Jus & Pickled Mushrooms; Nini: Chawanmushi with Mushrooms; Pablo: Seared Sea Bass with Pickled Radishes, Apples & Sautéed Mushrooms; Winner: Pablo; Eliminated: Caitlin, Kevin, Natalie, Nini
8	"Slime Time"	January 17, 2019
Challenge: The chefs cooked dishes using slimy ingredients, including okra, snails, jellyfish, nameko mushrooms, nattō, and mountain yams.: Pablo: Seared Skirt Steak with Black Garlic Aioli, Okra Tempura & Grated Jellyfish; Brandon: Warm Mountain Yam Noodles with Spicy Dashi & Sautéed Snails; Winner: Brandon; Eliminated: Pablo
9	"Get Cracklin'"	January 24, 2019
Challenge: The chefs were given one hour to cook a dish using pig ears, feet, skin, and tails.: Brandon: Pig Trotter & Pig Tail Crostini with Celery Salad & Crispy Pig Ears with Pimentón Aioli; Brian: Pig Tail Puttanesca with Mussels & Crispy Pig Ears; Winner: Brandon; Eliminated: Brian
10	"UFOs (Unidentified Food Objects)"	January 31, 2019
Challenge: The chefs selected three items from an assortment of "mystery ingredients", which were left purposefully unlabeled and prepped in ways to make them hard to identify.: Brandon: Mystery Meat Empanada, Curry, Mango Purée & Kale Chimichurri; David: Scallops with Romesco, Cauliflower Purée & Apples; Winner: David; Eliminated: Brandon
11	"Shot Clock Shock"	February 7, 2019
Challenge: The chefs were allowed to cook any dish; however, both chefs had to share one knife, and were only given possession of the knife for 30 seconds at a time.: David: Meatball, Goat Cheese Hidden Valley Ranch Mousse & Lavash Cracker; Michelle: Handmade Orecchiette with Hidden Valley Ranch Chili Ragù & Sweet Peppers; Winner: Michelle; Eliminated: David
12	"The Final Knockout"	February 14, 2019
Challenge: The chefs created dishes inspired by the "most difficult knockout" of their lives. The chef with the best dish was declared the winner of Last Chance Kitchen and rejoined the main competition.: Michelle: Scallop Dumpling with Beet & Fennel Broth; Eddie: Halibut with Cauliflower Purée, Brown Butter Emulsion & Cauliflower Macadamia Relish; Winner: Michelle; Eliminated: Eddie
