= Denver Milk Market =

Food hall in the U.S. state of Colorado

- Interactive map of the Denver Milk Market area

General information
- Location: Denver, Colorado, U.S.
- Coordinates: 39°45′11″N 104°59′50″W

The Denver Milk Market is a food hall in Denver, Colorado, United States. Frank Bonanno opened the food hall in 2018 and sold the business to Sage Hospitality Group in 2023.

The food hall offers air hockey, shuffleboard, skee-ball, and Pac-Man. Tenants have included East3, Konjo Ethiopian Food, Lucky Bird, Marczyk Fine Foods, and YumCha.

== See also ==
- Denver Central Market
- List of restaurants in Denver
