= Adjepong =

Adjepong is a surname and it may refer to:

- Eric Adjepong, American chef, television personality, and author of Ghanaian descent
- Jason Adjepong Worilds (born 1988), American former NFL football outside linebacker
- Samuel Benson Adjepong (1914–?), Ghanaian politician
- Kwabs (Kwabena Sarkodee Adjepong; born 1990), English singer and songwriter
