= SliceWorks =

Pizza chain in the U.S. state of Colorado

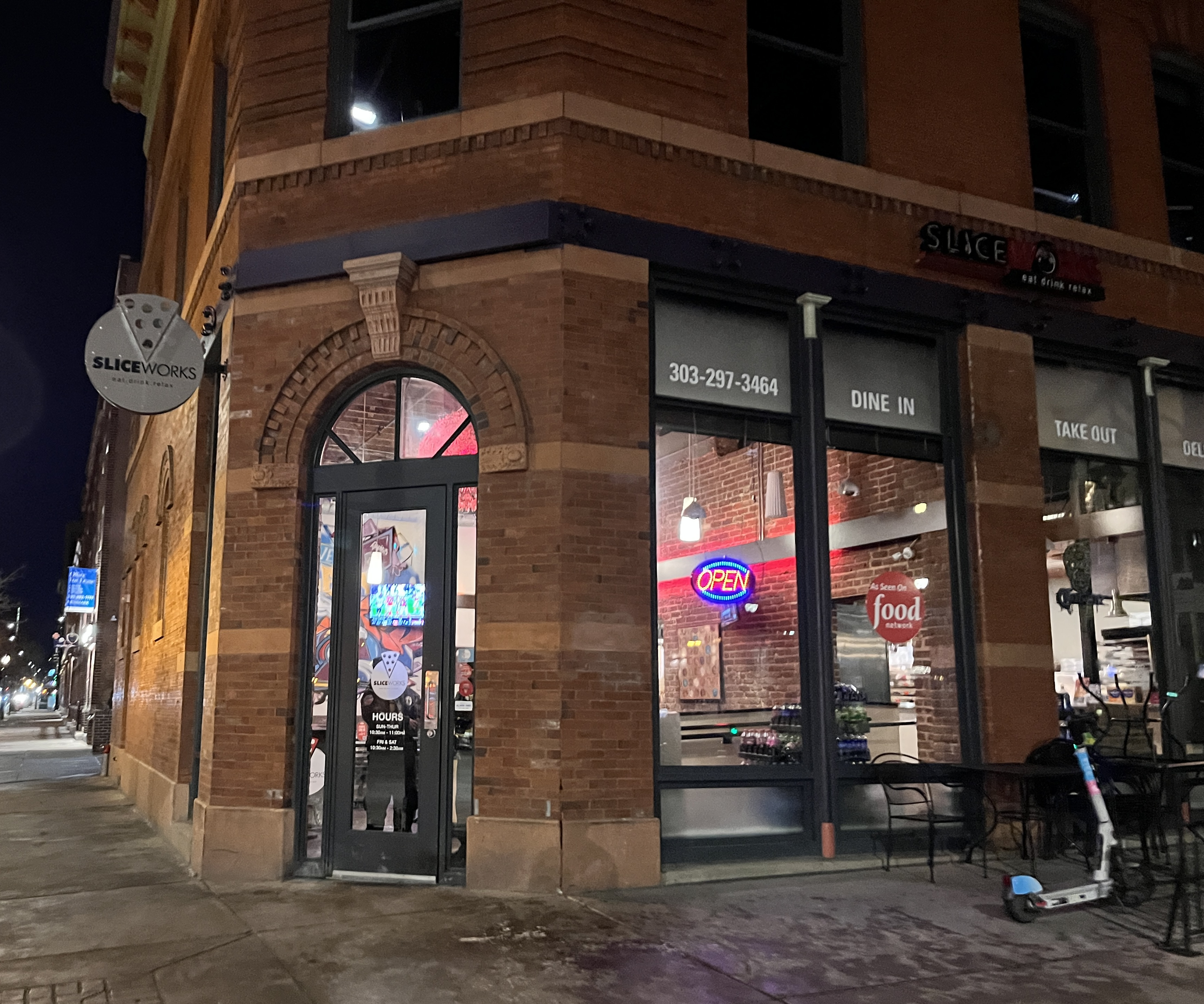
- Exterior of a location in Denver at night, 2025

Restaurant information
- Established: 2012
- Location: Colorado, United States
- Website: sliceworks.com

SliceWorks is a chain of pizzerias based in the U.S. state of Colorado. The business operates in Denver, Castle Rock, and Thornton.

== Description ==
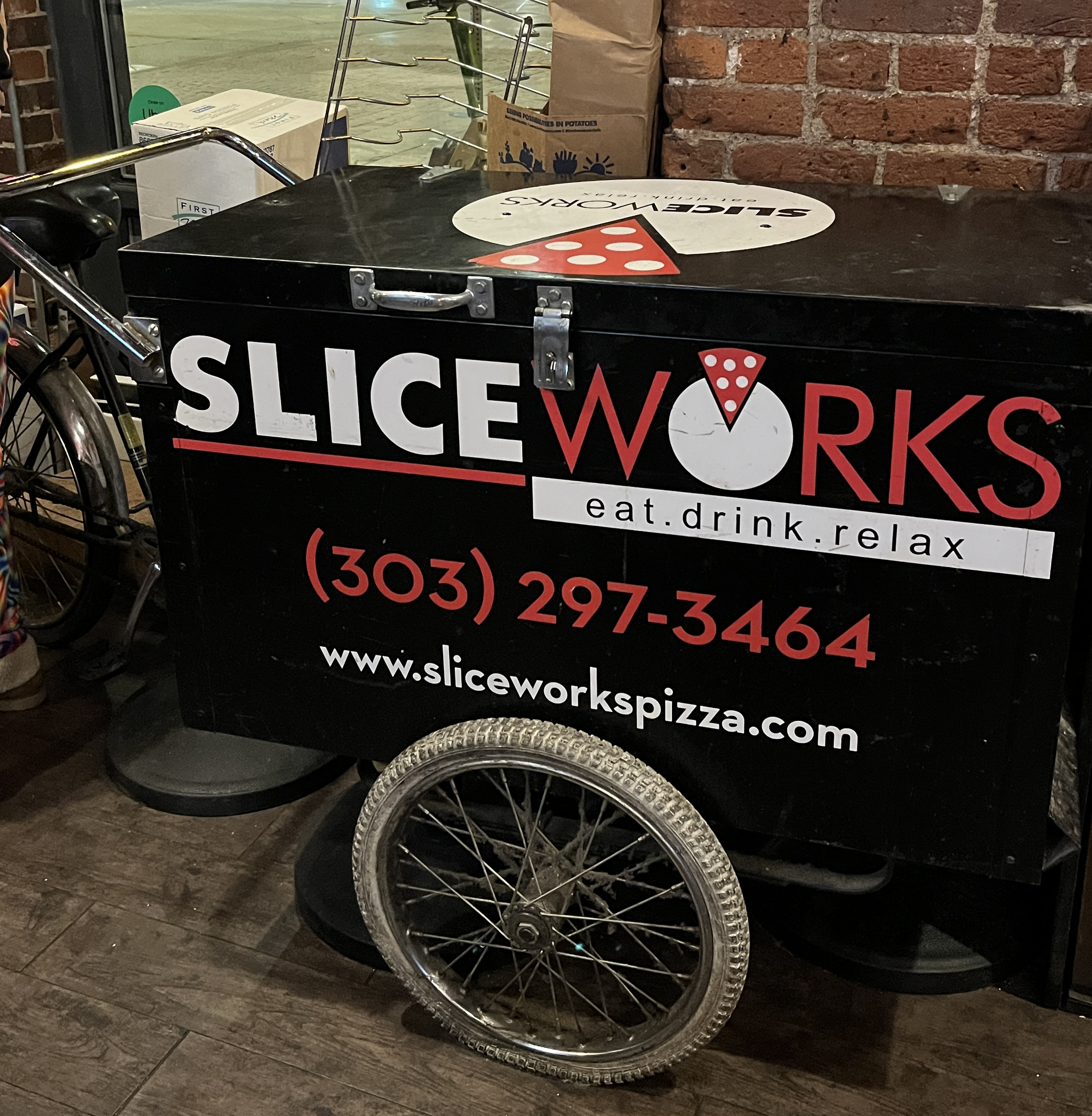
Delivery bicycle in 2025

The restaurant chain SliceWorks serves different styles of pizza (Brooklyn/New York, Neapolitan, and Sicilian). Among varieties is the Stuffed Meat pizza, which has ham, salami, pepperoni, sausage, and meatball. The Works pizza has mushrooms, onions and peppers, and meats. The jalapeño popper pizza, which has cream cheese, jalapeños, mozzarella and cheddar, and grape jelly. The Big Mac pizza with has beef patties, pickles, and a special sauce. Another variety has buffalo chicken.

== History and locations ==
SliceWorks was established in 2012. In Denver, the business operates in the LoDo neighborhood and on East Colfax Avenue. The business has locations in Castle Rock and Thornton.

== Reception ==
SliceWorks won in the Best Pizza category of Westword's 'Best of Denver' readers' poll in 2013. In Thrillist's 2014 overview of New York-style pizza in Denver, Michael Goodwin wrote, "If you make it past the window full of hippy pizza upon entering Slice Works, there actually is a superbly greasy, simple NY-style slice to be found at this popular joint. One of the quieter -- and roomier -- places on our list, Slice Works makes a good locale should your family come to town, and the upstairs bar offers a sweeping view on a colorful cast of Colfax characters."

== See also ==
- List of pizza chains of the United States
- List of restaurant chains in the United States
- List of restaurants in Denver
