= Margot (restaurant) =

Restaurant in Denver, Colorado, U.S.

- Interactive map of Margot

Restaurant information
- Chef: Justin Fulton
- Location: 1551 South Pearl Street, Denver, Colorado, United States
- Coordinates: 39°41′18″N 104°58′50″W

Margot is a Michelin-starred restaurant in Denver, Colorado, United States. Justin Fulton is the chef.

== See also ==
- List of Michelin-starred restaurants in Colorado
- List of restaurants in Denver
