= Milpero =

Mexican restaurant in Denver, Colorado, U.S.

- Interactive map of Milpero

Restaurant information
- Owner: Johnny Curiel
- Food type: Mexican
- Rating: 1 Michelin star
- Location: 3455 Ringsby Ct, Denver, Colorado, 80216, United States
- Coordinates: 39.771939°N 104.981990°W
- Seating capacity: 16
- Reservations: yes
- Website: milperodenver.com

Milpero is a Michelin-starred Mexican restaurant in Denver, Colorado, United States.

== See also ==
- List of Michelin-starred restaurants in Colorado
