= Băo Brewhouse =

Restaurant in Denver, Colorado, U.S.

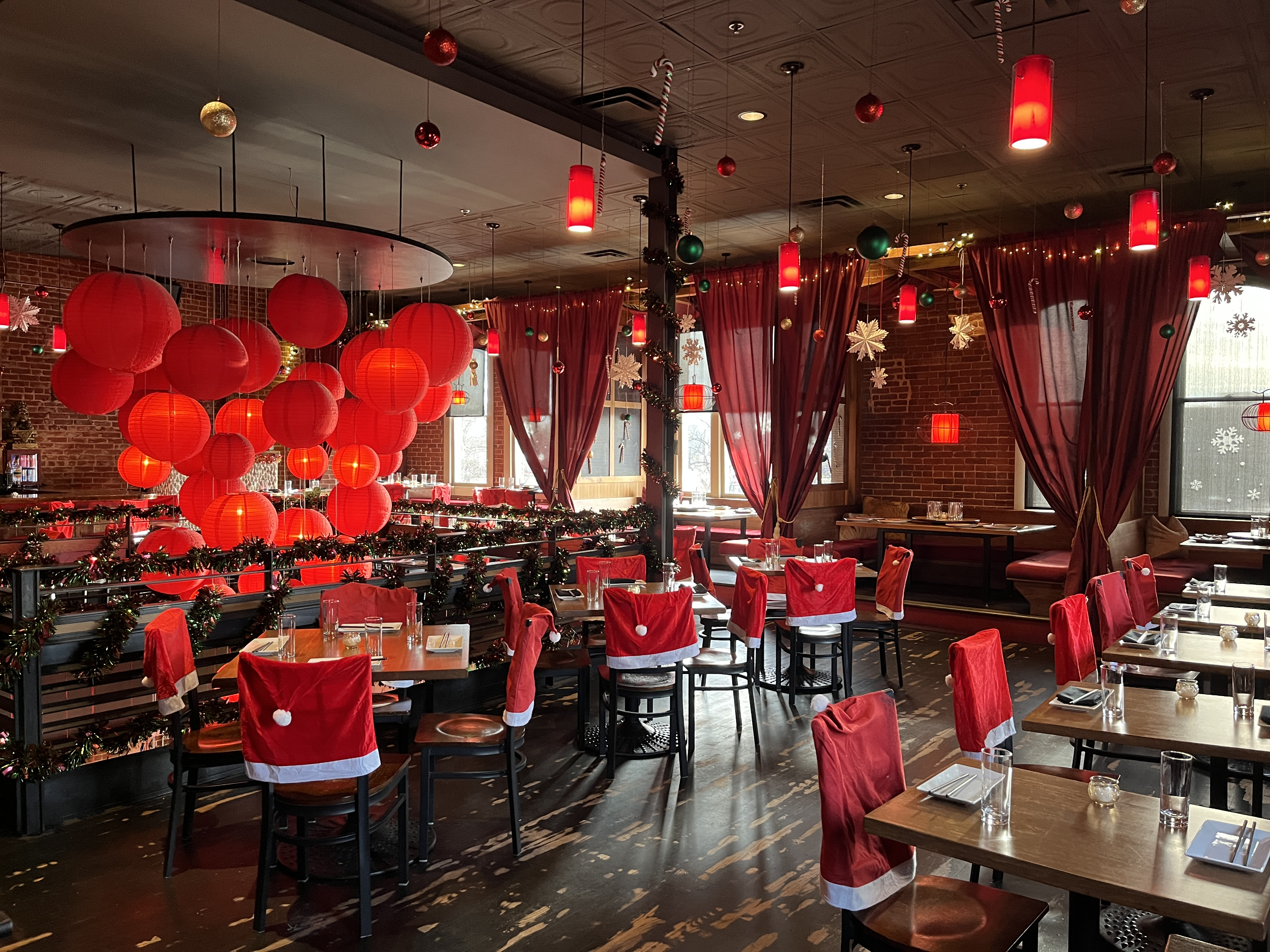
- Restaurant interior, 2025

Restaurant information
- Owner: Michael Swift
- Food type: Asian
- Location: Denver, Colorado, United States
- Website: baobrewhouse.com

Băo Brewhouse is an Asian restaurant in Denver, Colorado, United States. There are two locations, as of 2025.

== Description ==
The "Chinese-inspired" Asian restaurant Băo Brewhouse operates in Denver, Colorado. It has a taproom and a teahouse. In addition to beer and cocktails, the Asian fusion menu includes dim sum such as pork dumplings, grilled chicken skewers, and vegetarian options. The restaurant has also served Asian-style wings, meatballs, liangpi, and lamb dan dan mian.

== History ==
The restaurant first opened in November 2020. Michael Swift is an owner.

The bar launched Nocturne Nights in 2024. In 2025, the restaurant hosted Jingle Bao Rock, a pop-up that "[channels] nostalgic Christmas vibes of the '90s", according to Westword.

In October 2026, former co-owner, Alexander Comisar, filed a lawsuit against Bao Brewhouse restaurant group owner Michael Swift. Comisar claims he was not compensated for his ownership stake and was wrongfully terminated for requesting to view financial records.

== See also ==
- List of Chinese restaurants
- List of restaurants in Denver
