= List of Michelin-starred restaurants in Colorado =

As of the 2026 guide, there are 10 restaurants in Colorado with a Michelin-star rating, a rating system used by the Michelin Guide to grade restaurants based on their quality.

The Michelin Guides have been published by the French tire company Michelin since 1900. They were designed as a guide to tell drivers about eateries they recommended to visit and to subtly sponsor their tires, by encouraging drivers to use their cars more and therefore need to replace the tires as they wore out. Over time, the stars that were given out started to become more valuable.

Multiple anonymous Michelin inspectors visit the restaurants several times. They rate the restaurants on five criteria: "quality of products", "mastery of flavor and cooking techniques", "the personality of the chef represented in the dining experience", "value for money", and "consistency between inspectors' visits". Inspectors have at least ten years of expertise and create a list of popular restaurants supported by media reports, reviews, and diner popularity. If they reach a consensus, Michelin awards restaurants from one to three stars based on its evaluation methodology: One star means "high-quality cooking, worth a stop", two stars signify "excellent cooking, worth a detour", and three stars denote "exceptional cuisine, worth a special journey". The stars are not permanent and restaurants are constantly being re-evaluated. If the criteria are not met, the restaurant will lose its stars.

The Colorado guide was announced on June 14, 2023, with Colorado becoming the sixth Michelin Guide region in the United States in partnership with the Colorado Tourism Office initially covering Aspen and Snowmass Village, Boulder, Denver, and Vail and Beaver Creek Resort. Cities paid between $70,000 and $100,000 on top of a state contribution; other cities (Aurora, Colorado Springs, Fort Collins, and Grand Junction) declined to participate at that time. The complete selection and ratings for 2023 guide were revealed on September 12, 2023, awarding one star to five restaurants. In 2026, the Colorado guide will expand to cover the entirety of the state.

== Lists ==
Key
1 Michelin star	One Michelin star
2 Michelin stars	Two Michelin stars
—	The restaurant did not receive a star that year

Michelin-starred restaurants
Name	Cuisine	Location	2023	2024	2025	2026
Alma Fonda Fina	Mexican	Denver – Highland	—	1 Michelin star	1 Michelin star	1 Michelin star
Beckon	Contemporary	Denver – Five Points	1 Michelin star	1 Michelin star	1 Michelin star	1 Michelin star
Bosq	Contemporary	Aspen	1 Michelin star	1 Michelin star	1 Michelin star	1 Michelin star
Brutø	Mexican	Denver – LoDo	1 Michelin star	1 Michelin star	1 Michelin star	1 Michelin star
Frasca Food and Wine	Italian	Boulder	1 Michelin star	1 Michelin star	1 Michelin star	1 Michelin star
Kizaki	Japanese	Denver – South	—	—	1 Michelin star	1 Michelin star
Margot	Contemporary	Denver – South	—	—	1 Michelin star	1 Michelin star
Mezcaleria Alma	Mexican	Denver – Highland	—	—	1 Michelin star	1 Michelin star
Milpero	Mexican	Denver – Five Points	—	—	—	1 Michelin star
The Wolf's Tailor	Contemporary	Denver – Sunnyside	1 Michelin star	1 Michelin star	2 Michelin stars	2 Michelin stars
Reference(s)						

== See also ==
- List of Michelin-starred restaurants in the American Southwest
- List of Michelin-starred restaurants in California
- List of Michelin Bib Gourmand restaurants in the United States
