= Alma Fonda Fina =

Restaurant in Denver, Colorado, U.S.

- Interactive map of Alma Fonda Fina

Restaurant information
- Established: December 2023
- Owners: Johnny Curiel; Kasie Curiel
- Head chef: Johnny Curiel
- Food type: Mexican
- Rating: (Michelin Guide)
- Location: 2556 15th Street, Denver, Colorado, 80211, United States
- Coordinates: 39°45′29″N 105°00′42″W
- Website: www.almalohidenver.com

Alma Fonda Fina is a Mexican restaurant in Denver, Colorado. It was established in December 2023, by Johnny and Kasie Curiel. In 2024, the restaurant earned one Michelin star.

== Description ==
The menu consists of Mexican foods, including carnitas from pork belly and tacos on tortillas made of sourdough flour.

== History ==
Alma Fonda Fina opened in December 2023 by couple Johnny and Kasie Curiel, in the space previously occupied by Truffle Table.

== Reception ==
In 2024, Alma Fonda Fina earned one Michelin star, denoting "high-quality cooking, worth a stop".

== See also ==
- List of Michelin-starred restaurants in Colorado
- List of restaurants in Denver
