= Yuan Wonton =

Restaurant in Denver, Colorado, U.S.

- Interactive map of Yuan Wonton

Restaurant information
- Location: Denver, Colorado, United States
- Coordinates: 39.75791°N 104.92811°W

Yuan Wonton is a restaurant in Denver, Colorado, United States. It was included in The New York Times's 2024 list of the 50 best restaurants in the U.S.

== See also ==
- List of restaurants in Denver
