= Mezcaleria Alma =

Mexican restaurant in Denver, Colorado, U.S.

- Interactive map of Mezcaleria Alma

Restaurant information
- Food type: Mexican
- Location: 2550 15th Street, Denver, Colorado, United States
- Coordinates: 39°45′29″N 105°00′42″W
- Website: mezcaleriaalma.com

Mezcaleria Alma is a Michelin-starred Mexican restaurant in Denver, Colorado, United States. It was included in The New York Times's 2025 list of the nation's 50 best restaurants.

== See also ==
- List of Mexican restaurants
- List of Michelin-starred restaurants in Colorado
- List of restaurants in Denver
