= The Wolf's Tailor =

Restaurant in Denver, Colorado, U.S.

- Interactive map of The Wolf's Tailor

Restaurant information
- Head chef: Taylor Stark
- Food type: Contemporary
- Rating: (Michelin Guide)
- Location: 4058 Tejon Street, Denver, Colorado, 80211, United States
- Coordinates: 39°46′22.2″N 105°0′40″W
- Website: www.thewolfstailor.com

The Wolf's Tailor is a Michelin-starred restaurant in Denver, Colorado, United States.

== See also ==
- List of Michelin-starred restaurants in Colorado
- List of restaurants in Denver
