= Fire on the Mountain (restaurant) =

Restaurant chain in the United States

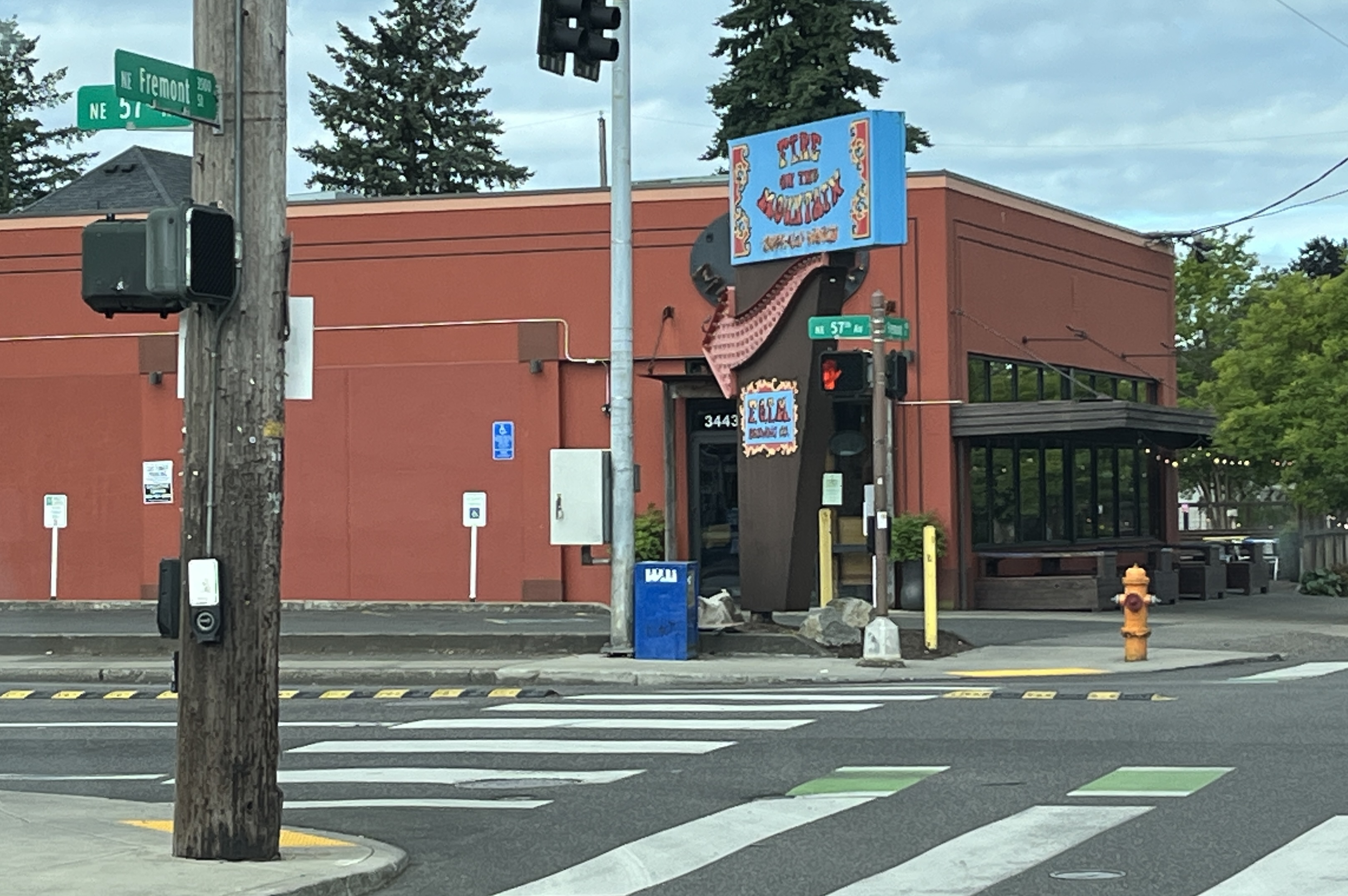
- Exterior of a restaurant in northeast Portland, Oregon, 2025

Restaurant information
- Location: Oregon; Colorado, United States

Fire on the Mountain is a small chain of restaurants in the United States. The business was established in 2005. In Oregon, Fire on the Mountain operates in Portland, where there are three locations, as well as Bend. The restaurant has two locations in Denver, Colorado. Sara Sawicki and Jordan Busch are owners.

== Description ==
Fire on the Mountain is named after a 1978 song of the same name by Grateful Dead and themed after the rock band. The menu includes barbecue and buffalo chicken wings, as well as French fries, onion rings, tater tots, salads, and fried Oreo cookies and Twinkie cakes. Drink options include iced tea and lemonade, and Fire on the Mountain brews its own beer. The jerk sauce has ginger spice.

The restaurant's El Jefe Challenge is a food challenge that tasks participants with eating 15 wings in the spiciest sauce (called El Jefe) within three minutes. Waivers must be signed at the Denver locations, and winners receive a T-shirt and can have their photograph added to a wall.

== History ==
The original location opened Interstate Avenue in north Portland's Overlook neighborhood in 2005. The business also operates on Fremont Street in northeast Portland's Rose City Park neighborhood and on East Burnside Street in southeast Portland's Buckman neighborhood.

The first Denver location opened in 2012. The second followed in 2019.

== Reception ==
In Thrillist's 2015 overview of Portland's best chicken wings, Drew Tyson called Fire on the Mountain the "indisputable kings of the hot wing". In 2017, Michael Russell of The Oregonian called the restaurant the "best-known spot for classic Buffalo-style wings", and Today's Alessandra Bulow included a Denver location in a list of 13 of the best chicken wing eateries in the U.S. Alex Frane and Jordan Michelman included the business in Portland Monthly's 2026 list of the city's best chicken wings.

== See also ==
- List of restaurant chains in the United States
- List of restaurants in Denver
