= Eric Adjepong =

American chef

- Born: New York City, New York, U.S.
- Education: Johnson & Wales University, University of Westminster
- Known for: Celebrity chef, television personality, author
- Spouse: Janell Mack (m. 2016–2022; divorced)
- Children: 1
- Website: chefadjepong.com

Eric Adjepong is an American chef, television personality, and author, of Ghanaian heritage. He was a finalist on the television series Top Chef: Kentucky season 16. He has appeared on multiple Food Network television shows, including as host of Alex vs. America and Wildcard Kitchen.

== Early life and education ==
Eric Adjepong was born and raised in the Bronx neighborhood in New York City and is of Ghanaian descent. He was the first member of his family to be born outside of Ghana, his parents immigrated to the United States in the 1980s.

He has a degree in culinary arts and nutrition from Johnson & Wales University, and a master’s of public health degree in international public health nutrition from the University of Westminster.

Adjepong married Janell Mack in 2016, and together they have a daughter. The couple separated in October 2021, and filed for divorce a few months after in January 2022.

== Career ==
Adjepong's culinary interest are in the American South, West African, Caribbean, and South American cuisines. He opened Elmina, a restaurant serving Ghanaian food, in Washington, DC in 2025. He co-owns with his ex-wife Janell, "Pinch and Plate" in Washington, D.C., a catering company which also hosts pop-up meals.

In 2018, Adjepong made it to the Top Chef: Kentucky finale, where he competed against two other chefs: Kelsey Barnard Clark of Alabama, and Sara Bradley of Kentucky. He ambitiously announced his meal for the series finale would, “tell the story of the transatlantic slave trade and how those flavors migrated to the South”, which highlighted both underrepresented cuisine and history.

After becoming a finalist on season 16 of Top Chef: Kentucky, Adjepong competed on season 17 of Top Chef: All-Stars L.A. and several other Food Network shows, like Guy Fieri's Tournament of Champions. He has been a food competition judge on the television series, the Great Soul Food Cook-Off, Supermarket Stakeout, Guy's Grocery Games, Beat Bobby Flay, and Chopped.

In 2020, he had plans to open a counter service restaurant called "On the Double" in the Union Market food hall, however it was greatly delayed.

Since January 2022, Adjepong is the host of Alex vs. America, a Food Network show on its fifth season starring chef Alex Guarnaschelli competing against a series of guest chefs with a focus on a single culinary genre.

In March 2025, Adjepong released his cookbook, Ghana to the World: Recipes and Stories That Look Forward While Honoring the Past, co-authored with food writer Korsha Wilson.

== Publications ==
- Adjepong, Eric (2023). Sankofa: A Culinary Story of Resilience and Belonging. Lala Watkins (illustrator). Penguin. ISBN 9780593661727.
- Adjepong, Eric; Wilson, Korsha (2025). Ghana to the World: Recipes and Stories That Look Forward While Honoring the Past. Clarkson Potter. ISBN 978-0593234778.
