= Ian's Pizza =

American pizza chain

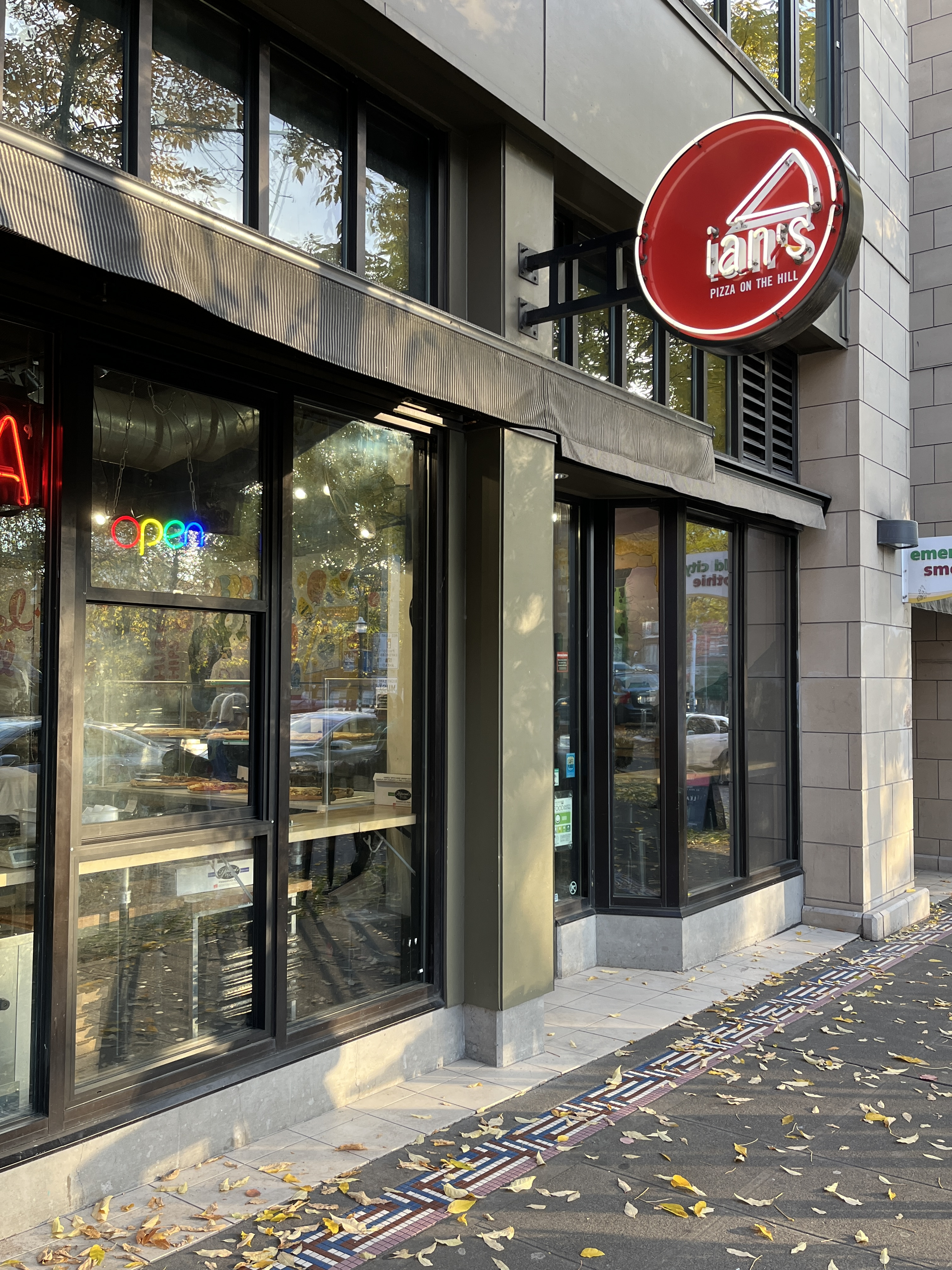
- Exterior of the location on Seattle's Capitol Hill, 2022
- Industry: Restaurants
- Area served: United States
- Products: Pizza
- Website: ianspizza.com

Ian's Pizza is an American pizza chain based in Wisconsin, United States.

== Locations ==
The business has operated in Denver, Madison, Milwaukee, Seattle, and Cedar Rapids. After an extensive flooding instance in 2023, the Denver location announced its closure in 2024. The location on Seattle's Capitol Hill closed in January 2025. Ian's Pizza no longer operates in Denver or Seattle, according to their website.

== See also ==
- List of pizza chains of the United States
- List of restaurants in Denver
