= Denver Central Market =

Food hall in Denver, Colorado, U.S.

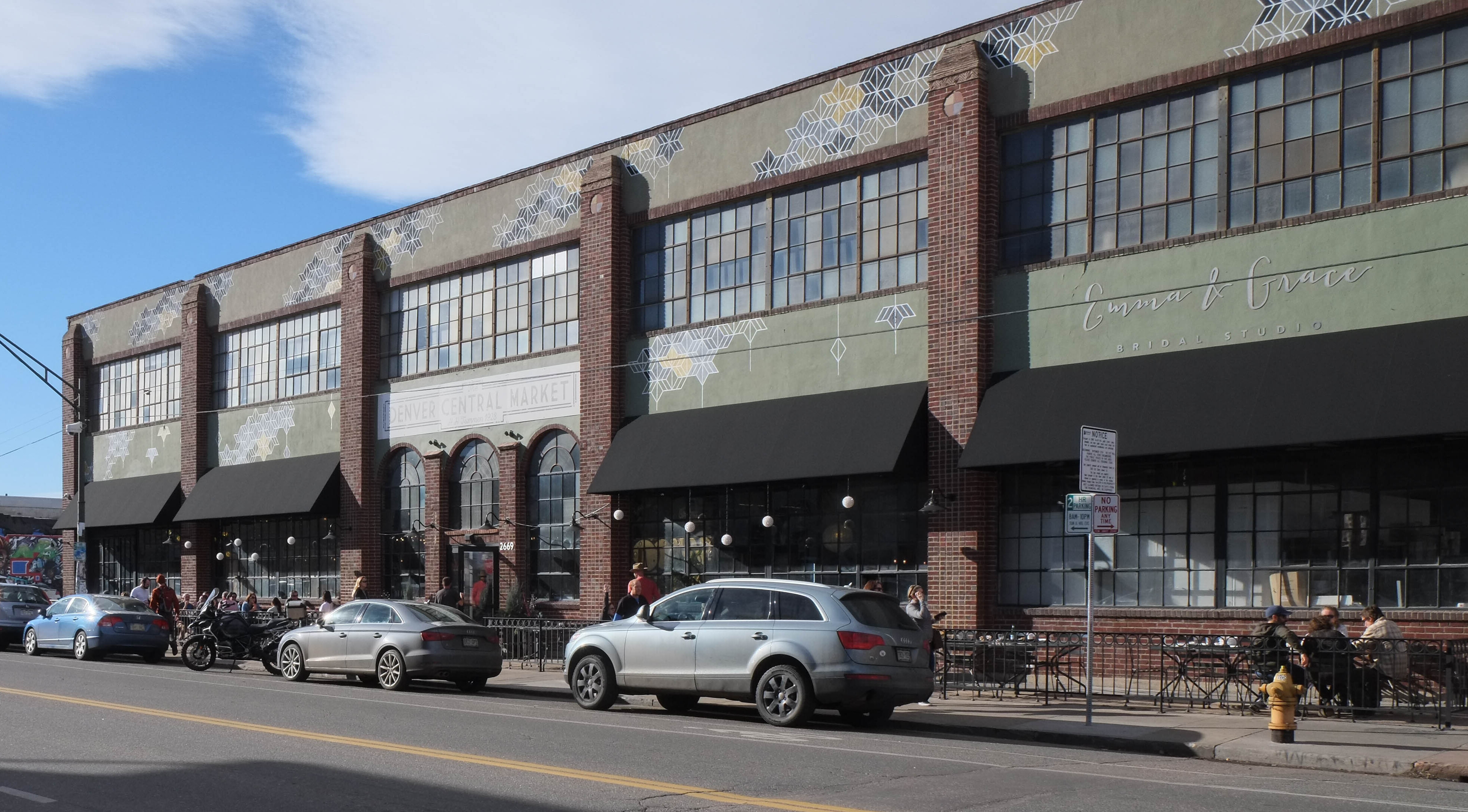
- Denver Central Market's exterior, 2016
- Interactive map of Denver Central Market
- Address: 2669 Larimer St; Denver, Colorado; United States
- Coordinates: 39°45′34″N 104°59′05″W
- Type: Food hall, marketplace
- Current use: Food hall and grocery

Construction
- Opened: September 2016
- Years active: 2016–present
- Architects: Merrill H. Hoyt and Burnham Hoyt (1928 building)

Website
- denvercentralmarket.com

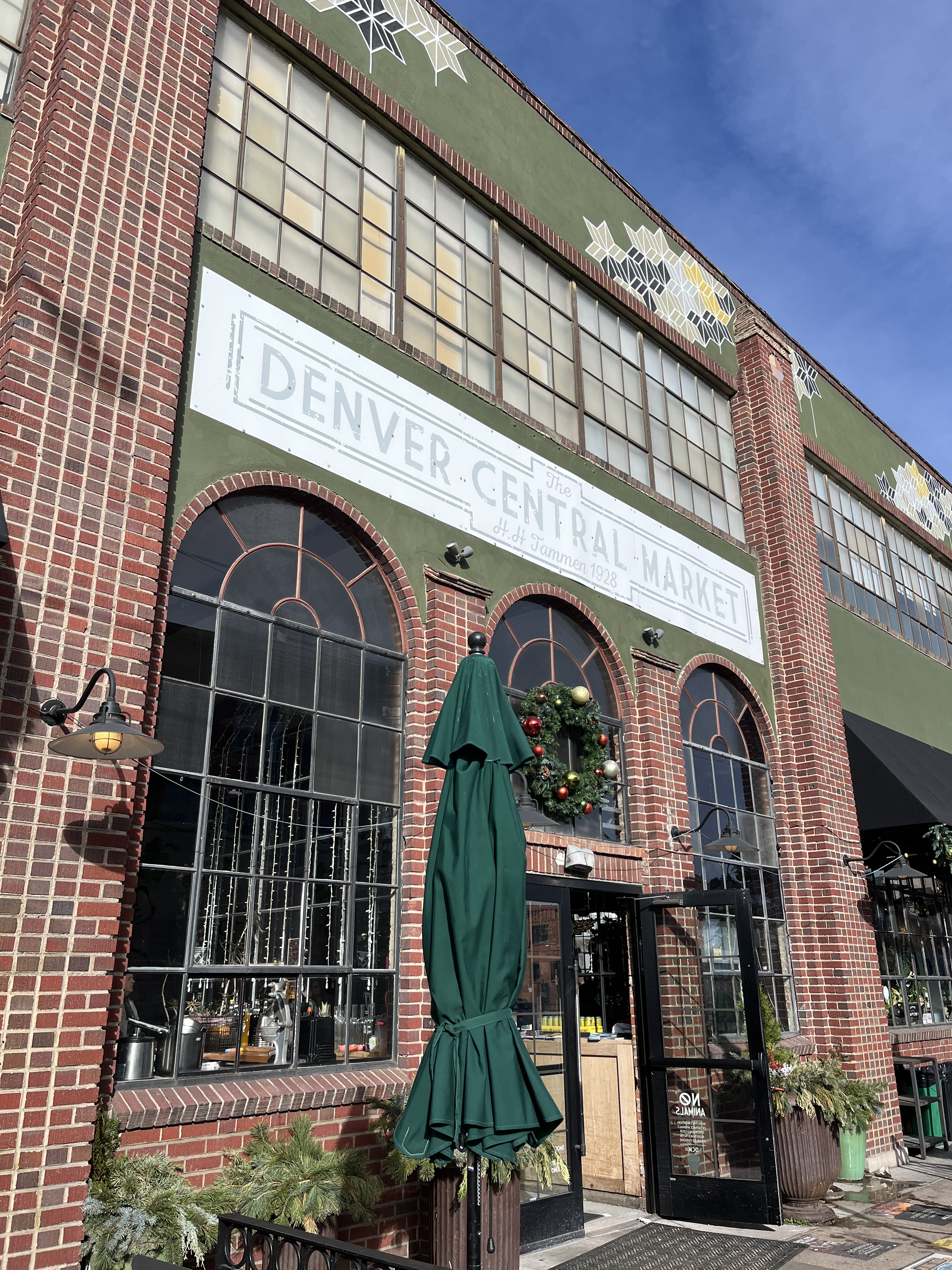
Exterior, 2025

Denver Central Market (DCM) is a food hall in Denver, Colorado, United States.

An "abbreviated" form of DCM operates at Denver International Airport.

== Description ==
Denver Central Market (DCM) is a 12,000-square-foot food hall on Lamier Street in Denver's RiNo neighborhood. It operates in the H.H. Tammen Curio Company building, which was completed in the 1920s. According to 303 Magazine, DCM "is the next step in the evolution of the bustling RiNo neighborhood and aims to provide essential grocery items in a neighborhood that has long been considered a food desert".

== History ==
The Denver Central Market is located in the former H.H. Tammen warehouse, named for a Denver merchant of fake Native American curiosities who died in 1924. The warehouse was constructed in the Art Deco style to designs of the brothers and local architectural partnership of Merrill and Burnham Hoyt. Their original designs for the structure are in the collections of the Denver Public Library.

DCM opened in 2016. In 2020, DCM partnered with CRUSH Walls to paint tables in the dining room.

=== Vendors ===
DCM has approximately one dozen vendors. When DCM opened, vendors included Crema Bodega, High Point Creamery, Izzio's, and Silva's Fish Market. Other vendors have included Call Your Mother, Curio, and Lunchboxx.

== Reception ==
In 2016, a writer for Eater Denver said "Some Google reviewers found the market’s warehouse space too cramped for the ambitious eleven vendor concept." DCM was included in Bon Appétit's list of the 50 best new restaurants in the U.S. in 2017.

== See also ==
- Denver Milk Market
- List of restaurants in Denver
