= The Matador (restaurant) =

Mexican restaurant chain based in Seattle, Washington, U.S.

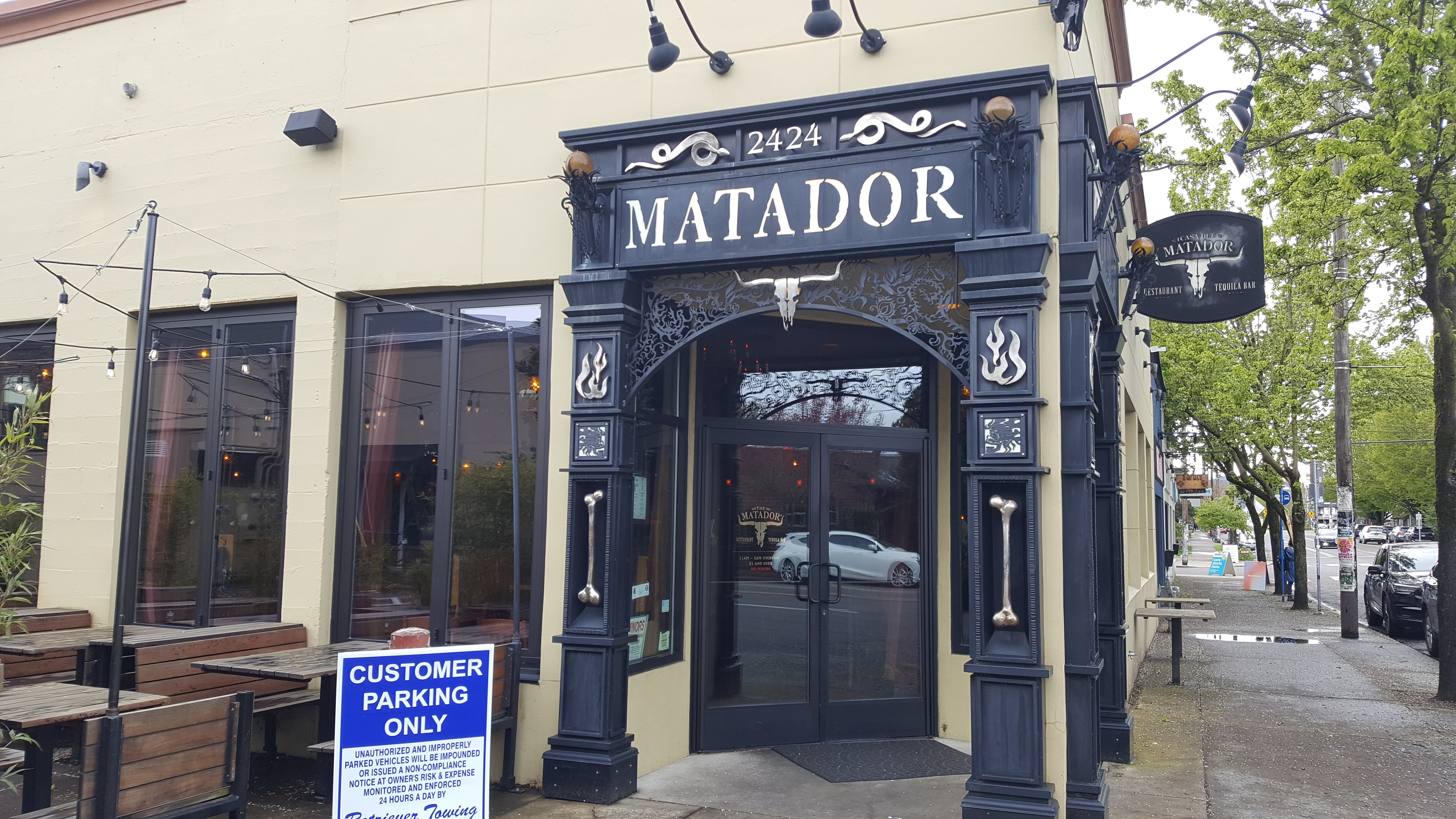
- Exterior of the restaurant on East Burnside Street in Portland, Oregon's Buckman neighborhood, 2022

Restaurant information
- Food type: Mexican
- Location: United States

The Matador is an American chain of Mexican restaurants, based in Seattle, Washington.

== Description and history ==
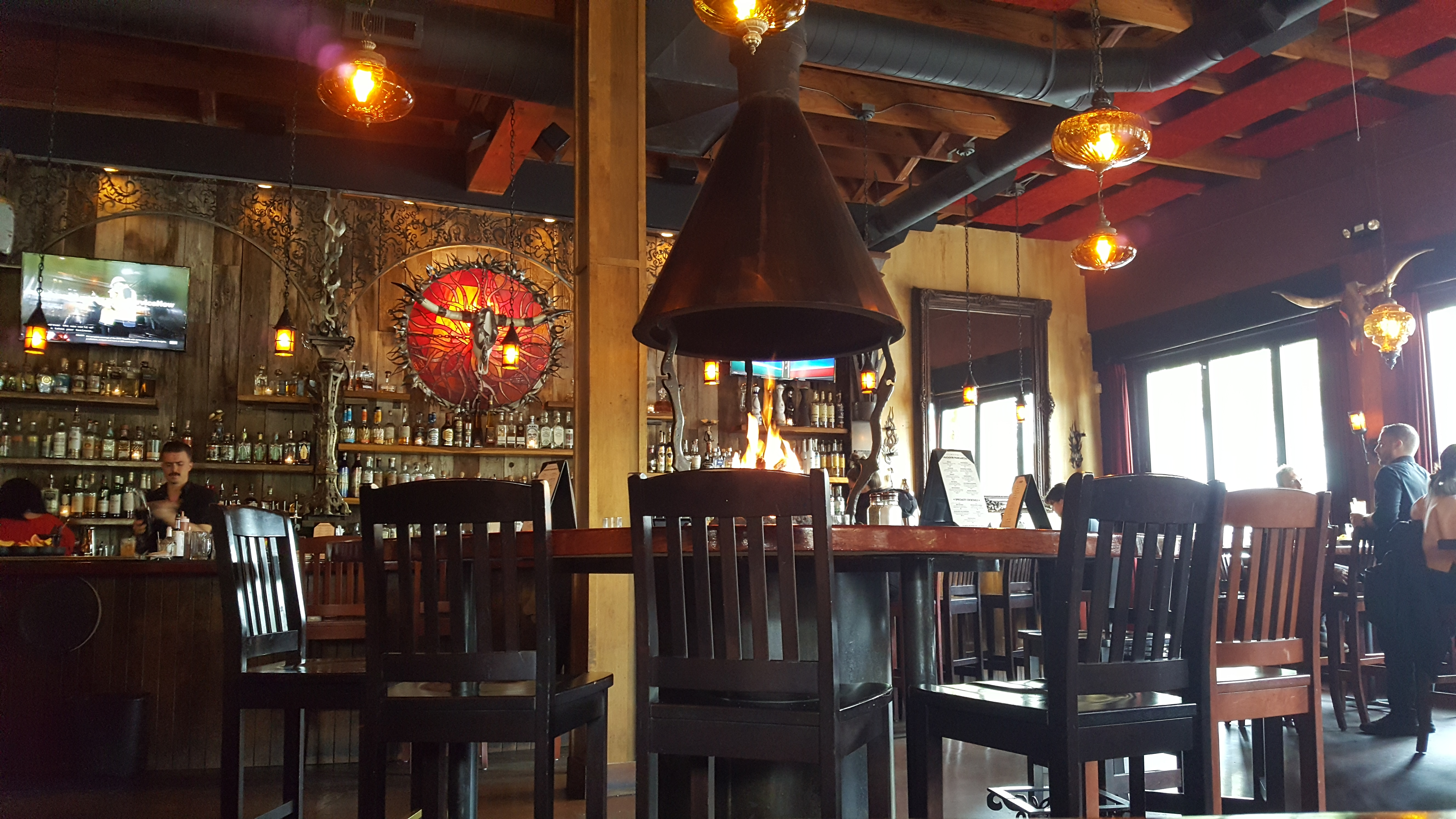
Interior of the restaurant in Portland's Buckman neighborhood in 2022

The Matador is a Mexican restaurant chain based in Seattle. Owners Nate Opper and Zak Melang started the business in 2004. As of February 2016, there were locations in Seattle, Portland (Oregon), Boise and Meridian, Idaho, and Denver. The restaurant also operated in Redmond and Tacoma, as of 2020. According to Bradley Martin of Eater Las Vegas, "Each location features distinctive ironwork created by Melang himself, who also cuts and designs each bar and table top and is in charge of corralling local artists to decorate mounted bull skulls, the decorative mascot for the brand."

The Boise location opened in 2010. A restaurant in Denver's Highland neighborhood opened in 2013, and offered over 100 different tequilas before closing permanently in 2020, during the COVID-19 pandemic. In 2016, the Ballard restaurant closed temporarily because of an E. coli outbreak.

== Reception ==
Seattle Metropolitan has said of the Redmond restaurant: "Decent Mex food served lunch and dinner with tequila galore. But be warned: if rollicking nighttime singles scenes are not your thing, leave before happy hour."

== See also ==
- List of Mexican restaurants
- List of restaurant chains in the United States
- List of restaurants in Denver
