= Beckon =

Restaurant in Denver, Colorado, U.S.

- Interactive map of Beckon

Restaurant information
- Established: November 21, 2018
- Owners: Duncan Holmes, Craig Lieberman
- Manager: Allison Anderson
- Head chef: Duncan Holmes
- Pastry chef: Tamara Tompkins
- Food type: Contemporary
- Rating: (Michelin Guide)
- Location: 2843 Larimer Street, Denver, Colorado, 80205, United States
- Coordinates: 39°45′40.1″N 104°58′56.4″W
- Seating capacity: 18
- Website: beckon-denver.com

Beckon is a Michelin-starred restaurant in Denver, Colorado, United States. In 2024, Beckon was a semifinalist in the Outstanding Restaurant category of the James Beard Foundation Awards.

== Description ==
The 18-seat restaurant serves contemporary cuisine, with dishes such as a goat crépinette, breaded oysters, and celery root.

== History ==
Beckon opened on November 21, 2018.

== Reception ==
Beckon received one Michelin star in 2023, becoming one of the first five restaurants in Colorado to earn one. In 2024, Beckon was a semifinalist in the Outstanding Restaurant category of the James Beard Foundation Awards.

== See also ==
- List of Michelin-starred restaurants in Colorado
- List of restaurants in Denver
