= Abe Conlon =

American chef

Abraham Conlon (born 1980 or 1981) is an American chef and a native of Lowell, Massachusetts, of Portuguese heritage. Conlon is the winner of the 2018 James Beard Foundation Award for Best Chef: Great Lakes.

== Education ==
Conlon was born in 1980 or 1981. At the early age of 15, Conlon showed interest in cooking and gained knowledge of classic sensibilities. Conlon graduated from Greater Lowell Technical High School in 1999.

He studied classical training at the Culinary Institute of America with mentors Franc Giovanini and Jon Matheison.

He studied fusion techniques under Norman Van Aken.

== Career ==
Conlon ran Chez Asian Bistro, a restaurant with a blend of Southeast Asian styles with local ingredients, in Santo Domingo, Dominican Republic.

He became the youngest chef to win the AAA 4 Diamond Award for Augustine’s at Fredericksburg Square in Virginia.

Conlon and his business partner, Adrienne Lo, founded X-marx, an underground supper club in Chicago that served seven to 12 courses, three to four times per week, without repeating dishes and no repetition of a dish to serve.

In November 2012, Conlon and Lo opened their own fine-dining restaurant, Fat Rice, named after the home-style arroz gordo in Logan Square, Chicago. Conlon was the head chef of Fat Rice. After interviewing previous workers of Fat Rice The New York Times reported in 2020 that the employees largely portrayed Conlon as "an extreme example of a restaurant-business archetype: a tantrum-prone chef who rules by fear and bullying". He published a letter of regret, saying, "I have hurt and let down many people. I hear the criticism of my character and behavior. As process and reflect, I'm realizing who I am, who I've become, and how I need to change. I am taking this time to learn and to grow so that I may be better for the people I have damaged."

== Awards ==
- James Beard Foundation Award 2018 – Best Chef: Great Lakes
- StarChefs: “Rising Star” 2015
- Four Diamond Award by AAA
- Nominated in 2017 for a James Beard Award for Excellence in Cuisine

== Published Book ==
- The Adventures of Fat Rice: Recipes from the Chicago Restaurant Inspired by Macau (Ten Speed Press)
