= Kizaki (restaurant) =

Japanese restaurant in Denver, Colorado, U.S.

- Interactive map of Kizaki

Restaurant information
- Established: April 11, 2025
- Chef: Toshi Kizaki
- Food type: Japanese
- Dress code: Casual
- Location: 1551 South Pearl Street, Denver, Colorado, 80210, United States
- Coordinates: 39°41′18″N 104°58′51″W

Kizaki is a Michelin-starred Japanese restaurant in Denver, Colorado, United States. Toshi Kizaki is the chef. The menu includes sushi, chawanmushi with snow crab, and grilled tuna collar.

== See also ==
- List of Japanese restaurants
- List of Michelin-starred restaurants in Colorado
- List of restaurants in Denver
- List of sushi restaurants
