= Church and Union =

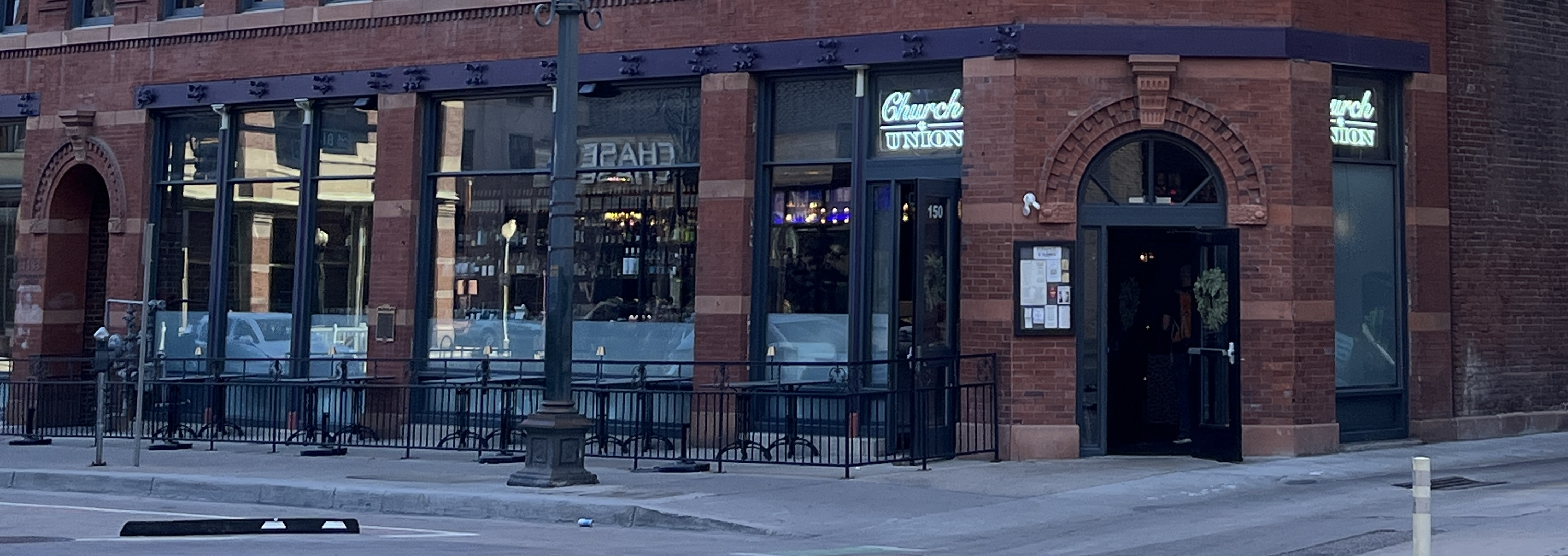
- Exterior of the restaurant in Denver, Colorado, 2025

Restaurant information
- Food type: American; New American
- Location: United States

Church and Union is a chain of American / New American restaurants. The business is owned by 5th Street Group, which is based in Charleston, South Carolina. In addition to Charleston, there are Church and Union locations in Charlotte, North Carolina, Denver, and Nashville.

== Description ==
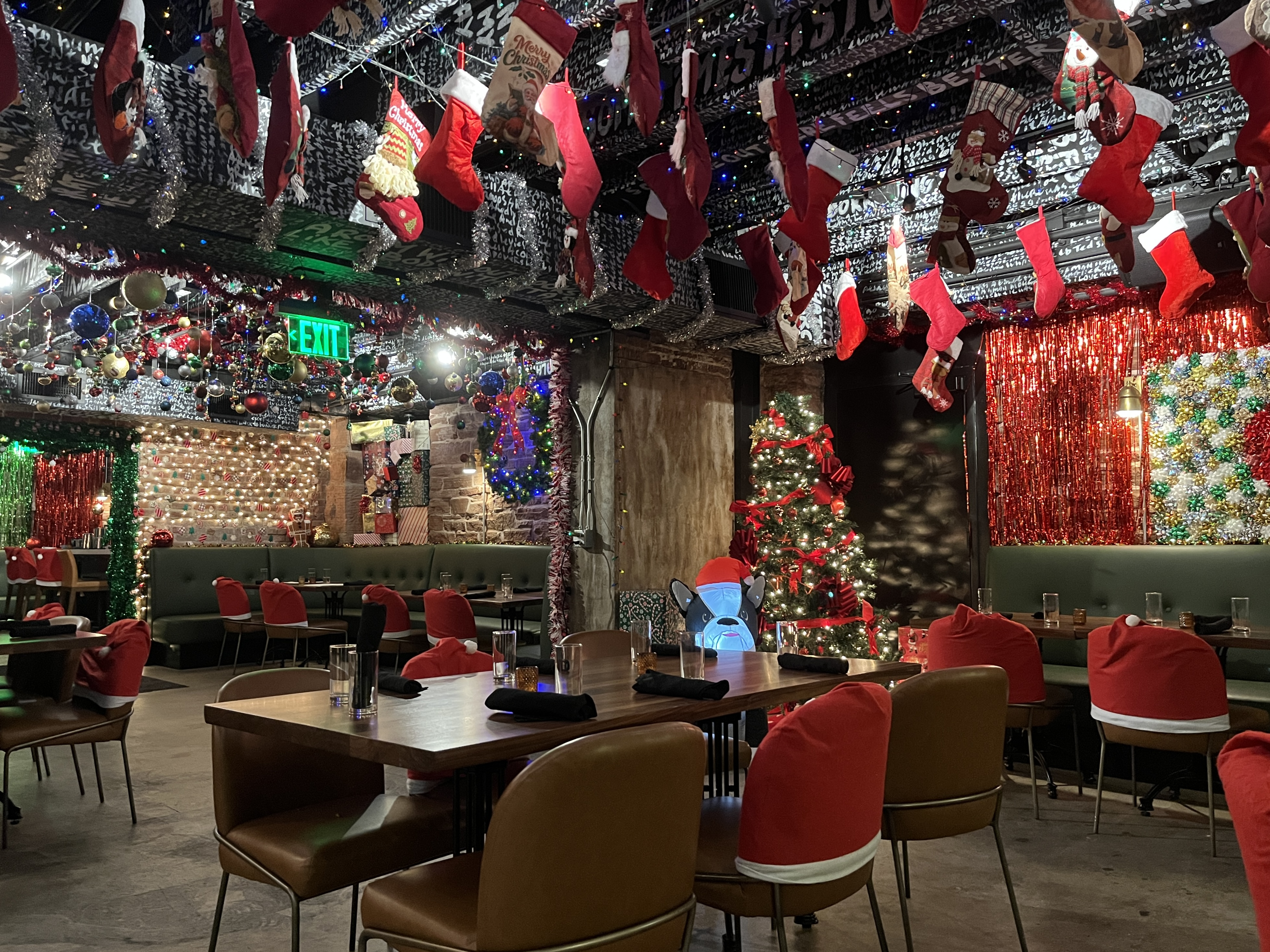
Interior of the Denver location, decorated for Christmas in 2025

The Charlotte location has been described as "swanky" by The Infatuation and has black leather seats and cherry blossom branches hanging from the ceiling.

== History ==
The first location opened in Charlotte. The business expanded to Charleston in 2015. The Denver location opened in 2024.

The restaurant was previously known as 5Church. There has been a dispute between the restaurant's owners.

The Nashville location launched a brunch menu in late 2021.

== Reception ==
Delia Jo Ramsey included Church and Union in Eater Nashville's 2021 list of 15 "dishes and drinks perfect for diehard pumpkin seekers" in the city, noting: " The newly opened downtown restaurant’s pastry chef Emily just introduced new cider doughnuts to the menu — with butternut squash cremeux, PSL streusel, and creme fraiche ice cream."

== See also ==
- List of New American restaurants
- List of restaurants in Denver
