= Fox and the Hen =

Restaurant in Denver, Colorado, U.S.

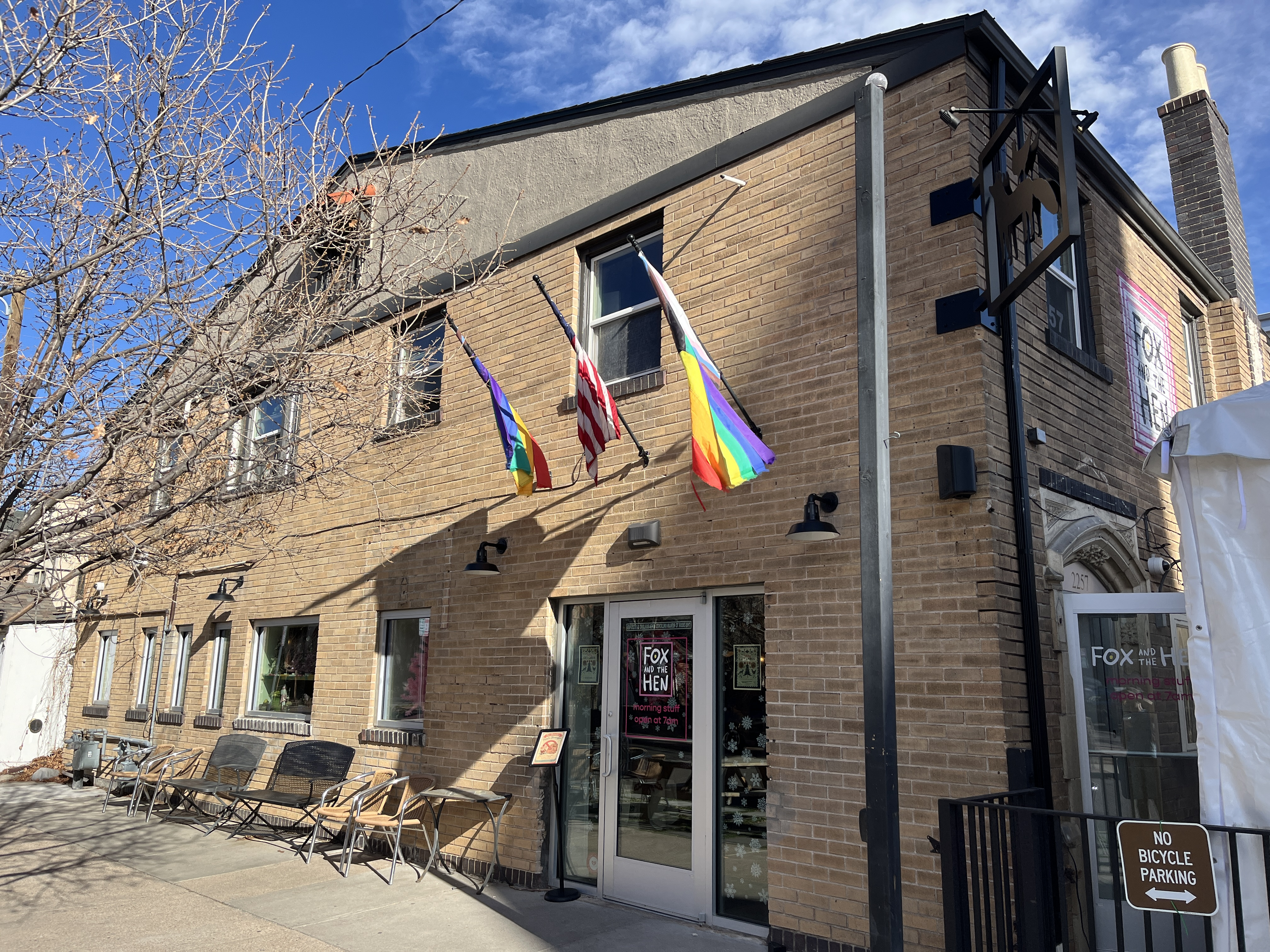
- The restaurant's exterior, 2025
- Interactive map of Fox and the Hen

Restaurant information
- Chef: Carrie Baird
- Location: 2257 West 32nd Avenue, Denver, Colorado, 80211, United States
- Coordinates: 39.7621°N 105.0142°W
- Website: foxandthehen.com

Fox and the Hen is a restaurant in Denver, Colorado, United States. It opened in the Highlands neighborhood in 2023. Co-founder Carrie Baird is the executive chef.

== Description ==
The restaurant Fox and the Hen operates in Denver's Highlands neighborhood. The interior has "quirky" wallpaper, according to The Infatuation.

The menu includes fried chicken, hash browns, the "Bobby Flay-vos" (huevos rancheros), pizza bagels, and fancy toasts. Phoenix Magazine describes the huevos rancheros as "two sunny-side-up eggs served chilaquiles-style on a crispy corn tortilla over a tangy bath of chunky tomatillo salsa and black beans". The French omelet has spring peas, garden cream cheese, beet-cured salmon, and "everything" spice. Among drink options are wine and the cocktail called "Kick Rocks Nerd", which has Woody Creek Mary's Gin and Pop Rocks.

== History ==
Executive chef Carrie Baird and Michael Fox opened the restaurant in 2023, in the space that previously housed Ceviche.

== Reception ==
Lily O'Neill included the business in The Denver Post's list of the twelve "hottest" restaurant openings of 2023. Erica Buehler, Allyson Reedy, and Molly Martin included Fox and the Hen in Thrillist's 2024 overview of Denver's best brunches. Reedy also included the business in The Infatuation's 2025 lists of the city's twelve best breakfasts and "brunch spots". Martin also included the restaurant in Westword's 2025 overview of Denver's best brunches.

Ruth Tobias included Fox and the Hen in Eater Denver's 2025 list of the city's "best breakfasts worth waking up for".

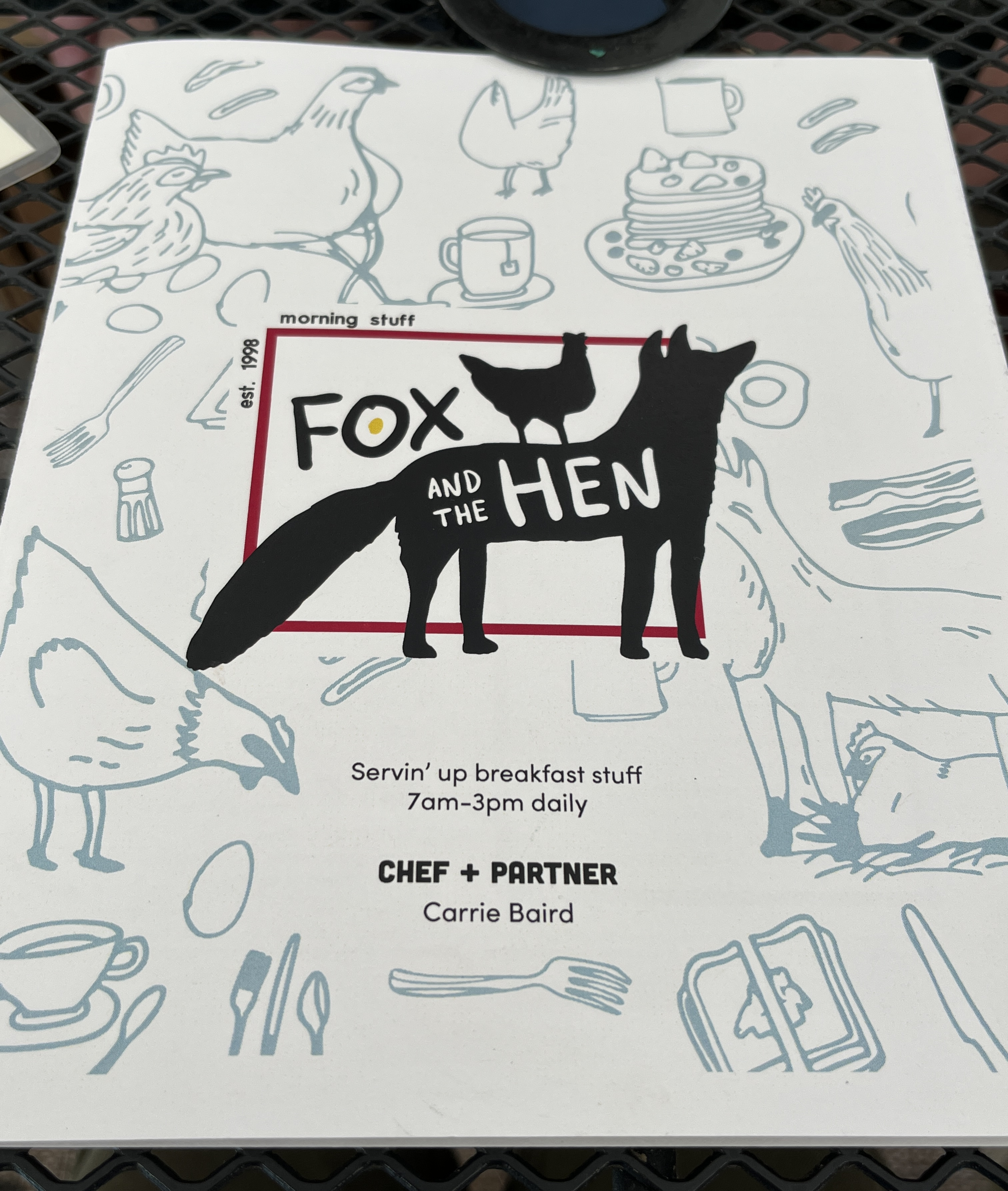
Menu

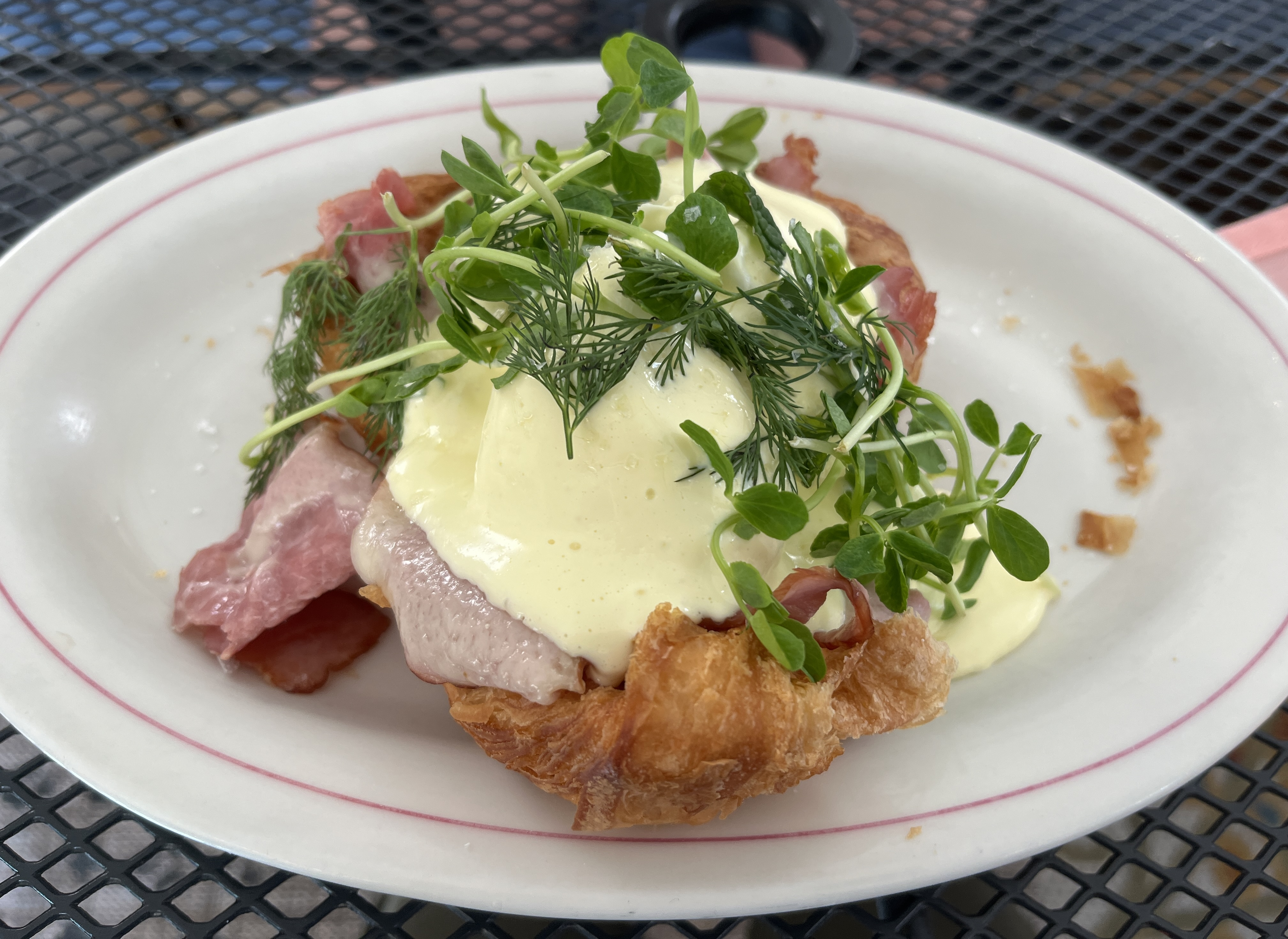
Eggs benedict

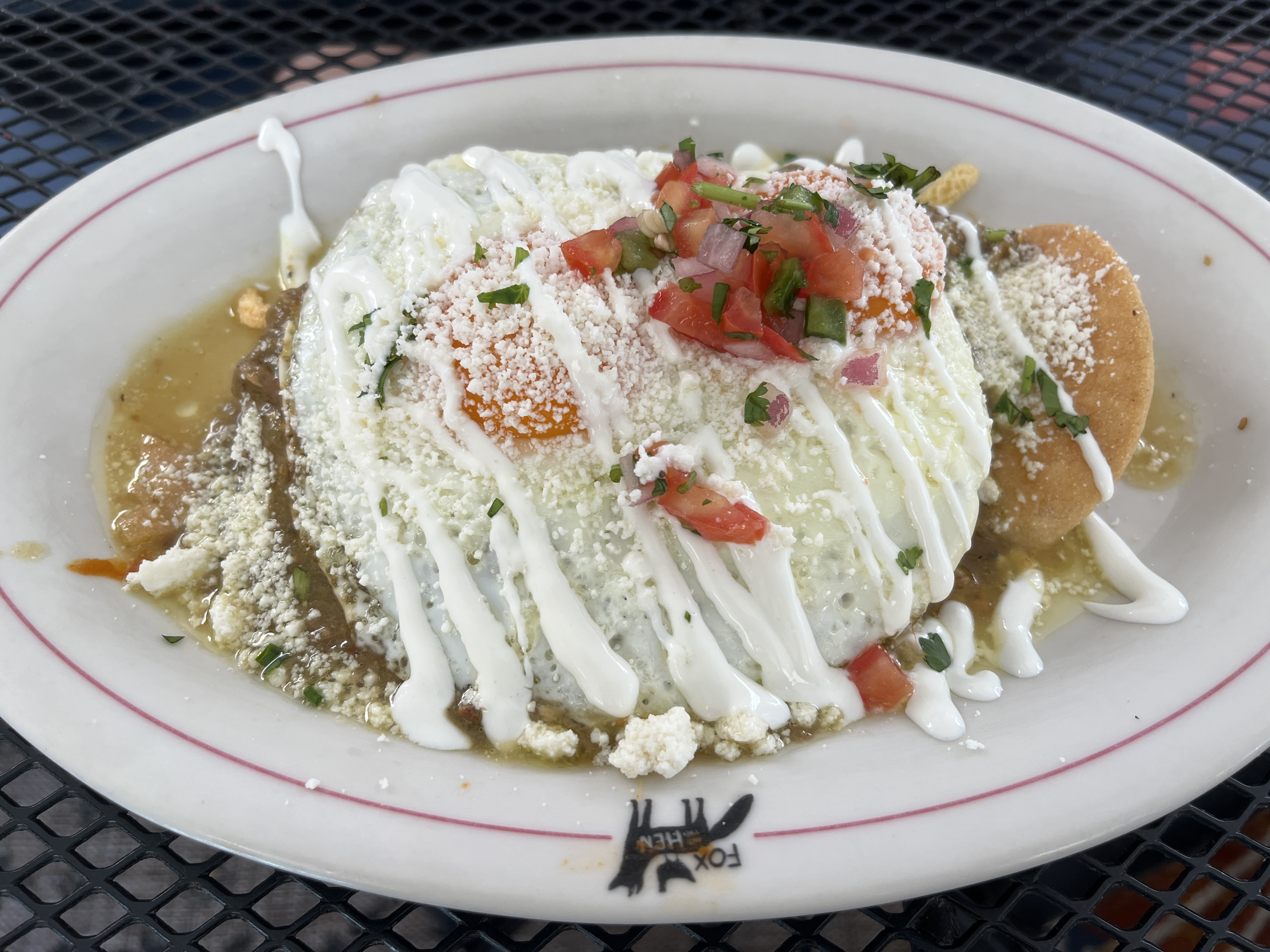
Huevos rancheros

== See also ==
- List of restaurants in Denver
