= Frasca Food and Wine =

Restaurant in Boulder, Colorado, U.S.

- Interactive map of Frasca Food and Wine

Restaurant information
- Head chef: Ian Palazzola
- Pastry chef: Alberto Hernandez
- Food type: Italian
- Rating: (Michelin Guide)
- Location: 1738 Pearl Street, Boulder, Colorado, 80302, United States
- Coordinates: 40°1′9.3″N 105°16′21″W
- Website: www.frascafoodandwine.com

Frasca Food and Wine is a Michelin-starred Italian restaurant in Boulder, Colorado.

== See also ==
- List of Italian restaurants
- List of Michelin-starred restaurants in Colorado
