= Sắp Sửa =

Vietnamese restaurant in Denver, Colorado, U.S.

- Interactive map of Sắp Sửa

Restaurant information
- Established: June 28, 2023
- Owners: Anna Nguyen; Ni Nguyen
- Head chef: Anna Nguyen; Ni Nguyen
- Food type: Vietnamese
- Location: 2550 East Colfax Avenue, Denver, Colorado, 80206, United States
- Coordinates: 39°44′23″N 104°57′24″W
- Website: sapsua.com

Sắp Sửa is a Vietnamese restaurant in Denver, Colorado, United States. It was a semifinalist in the Best New Restaurant category of the James Beard Foundation Awards in 2024. It was also named one of the twenty best new restaurants of 2024 by Bon Appétit.

The establishment and its owners created some controversy after making a post on Instagram stating "From the river to the sea, Falestine (sic) will be free", and then responded to reactions identifying that statement as antisemitism with a video in which owner/chef Ni Nguyen proclaims "Fuck Israel". The latter was later supplemented with a textual posting stating, "Jews are welcome, zionists are not".

== See also ==
- List of restaurants in Denver
- List of Vietnamese restaurants
