= La Diabla Pozole y Mezcal =

Restaurant in Denver, Colorado, U.S.

- Interactive map of La Diabla Pozole y Mezcal

Restaurant information
- Food type: Mexican
- Location: 2233 Larimer Street, Denver, Colorado, 80205, United States
- Coordinates: 39°45′19.6″N 104°59′23″W
- Website: ladiabladenver.com

La Diabla Pozole y Mezcal is a Mexican restaurant in Denver, Colorado. Established in July 2021, the business was included in The New York Times's 2023 list of the 50 best restaurants in the United States.

== See also ==
- List of Mexican restaurants
- List of Michelin Bib Gourmand restaurants in the United States
- List of restaurants in Denver
