= Brutø =

Restaurant in Denver, Colorado, U.S.

BRUTØ
- Interactive map of BRUTØ

Restaurant information
- Owners: Id Est (Kelly & Erika Whitaker)
- Head chef: Byron Gomez
- Food type: Brutalist American
- Rating: (Michelin Guide)
- Location: 1801 Blake Street, Denver, Colorado, 80202, United States
- Coordinates: 39°45′10″N 104°59′49″W
- Seating capacity: 18-seat chef's counter, two 2-seat high top tables
- Reservations: Recommended
- Website: www.brutodenver.com

Brutø is a Michelin-starred restaurant in Denver, Colorado, United States.

== See also ==
- List of Michelin-starred restaurants in Colorado
- List of restaurants in Denver
