= Bosq =

Restaurant in Aspen, Colorado, U.S.

- Interactive map of Bosq

Restaurant information
- Owner: Barclay Dodge
- Head chef: Barclay Dodge
- Rating: (Michelin Guide)
- Location: 312 S Mill Street, Aspen, Colorado, 81611, United States
- Coordinates: 39°11′19″N 106°49′11.2″W
- Website: bosqaspen.com

Bosq is a Michelin-starred restaurant in Aspen, Colorado.

== See also ==
- List of Michelin starred restaurants in Colorado
