= Kelsey Barnard Clark =

American chef

Kelsey Barnard Clark (born April 28, 1989) is an American chef. In 2019, she won season 16 of Top Chef.

== Early life and education ==
Clark was raised in Dothan, Alabama. She attended the Culinary Institute of America in Hyde Park, New York, and worked at Cafe Boulud and Dovetail.

== Career ==
In 2012, she started a catering business in Dothan, and then a restaurant, KBC. In 2019, she won season 16 of Top Chef, as of 2024 the only southerner to win the show. In 2020, the Alabama Tourism Department named one of KBC's sandwiches to their list of 100 Dishes to Eat in Alabama. In 2024, she was a semifinalist for a James Beard Award for Best Chef:South. She was one of the judges in the 2025 TV series "Next Gen Chef".

== Legal Issues ==
In January 2026, Clark was arrested on suspicion of driving under the influence after allegedly driving her vehicle into and demolishing a brick mailbox; she reportedly struggled and refused to complete field sobriety tests while at the scene. Her two children, ages 8 and 5, were present at the crash and were driven home by a family member upon Clark's booking at Dothan City Jail.

== Cookbooks ==
She has published two cookbooks, Southern Grit (2021) and Southern Get Togethers (2024).
