= List of restaurants in Denver =

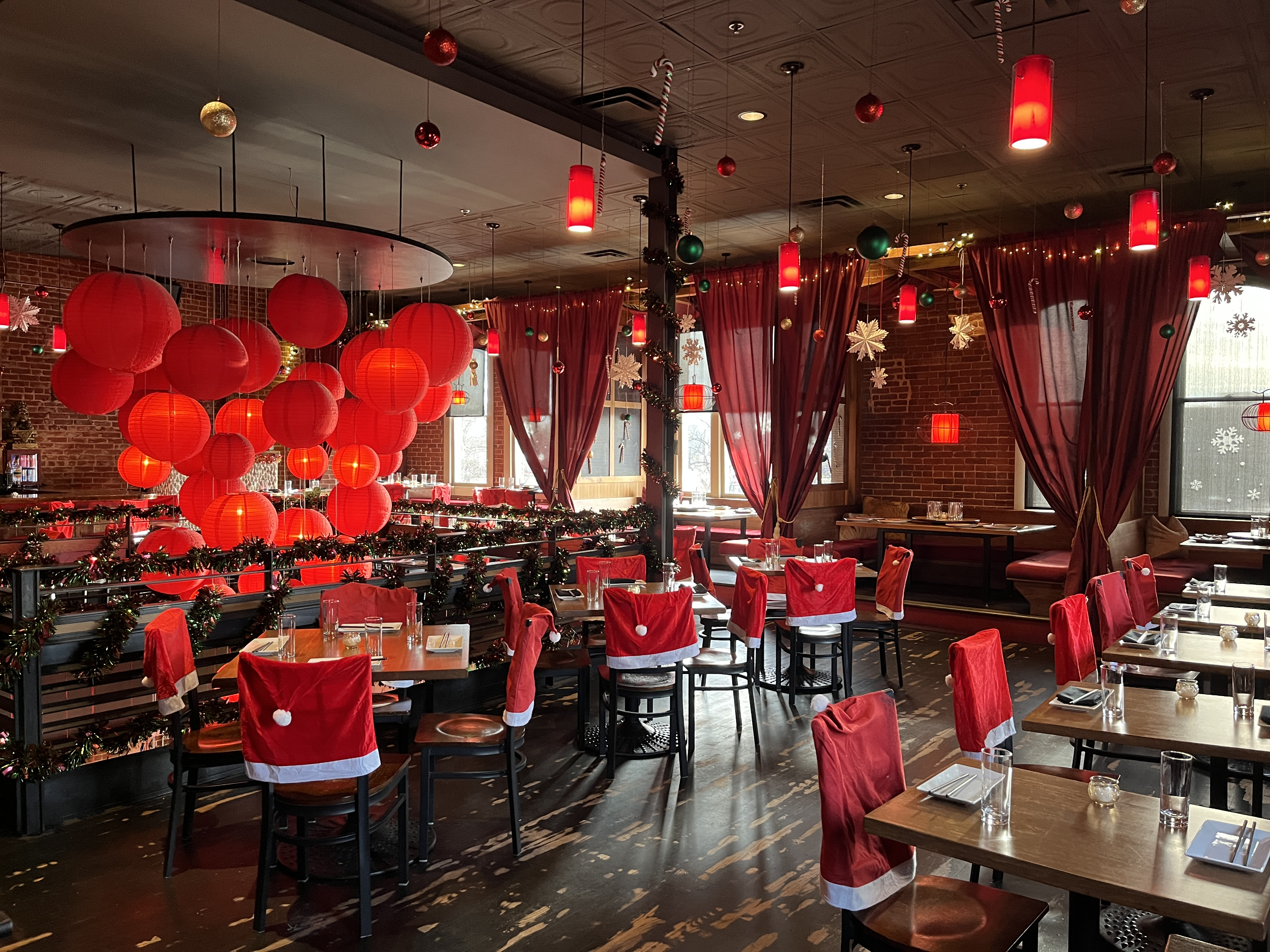
Băo Brewhouse

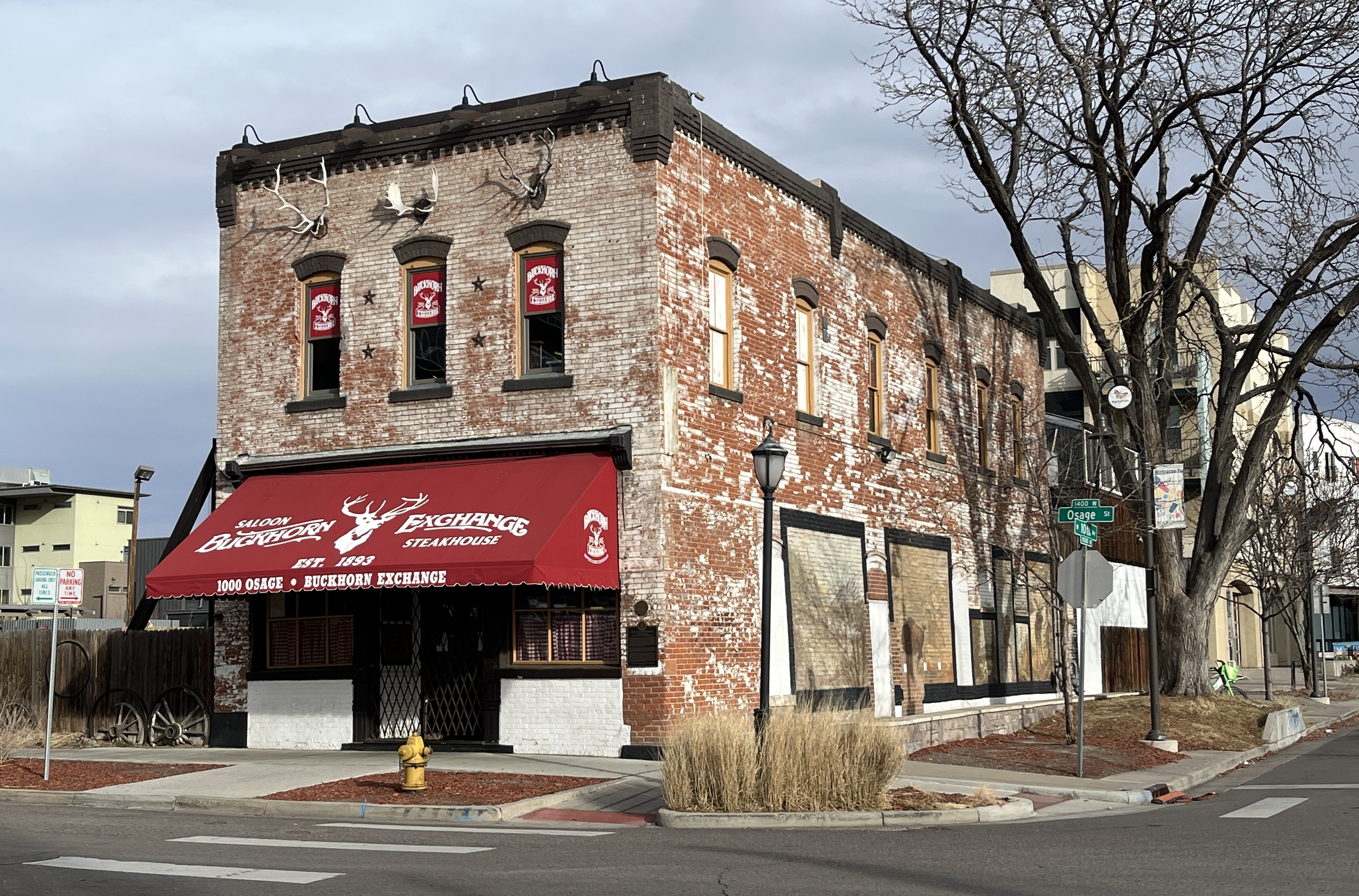
Buckhorn Exchange

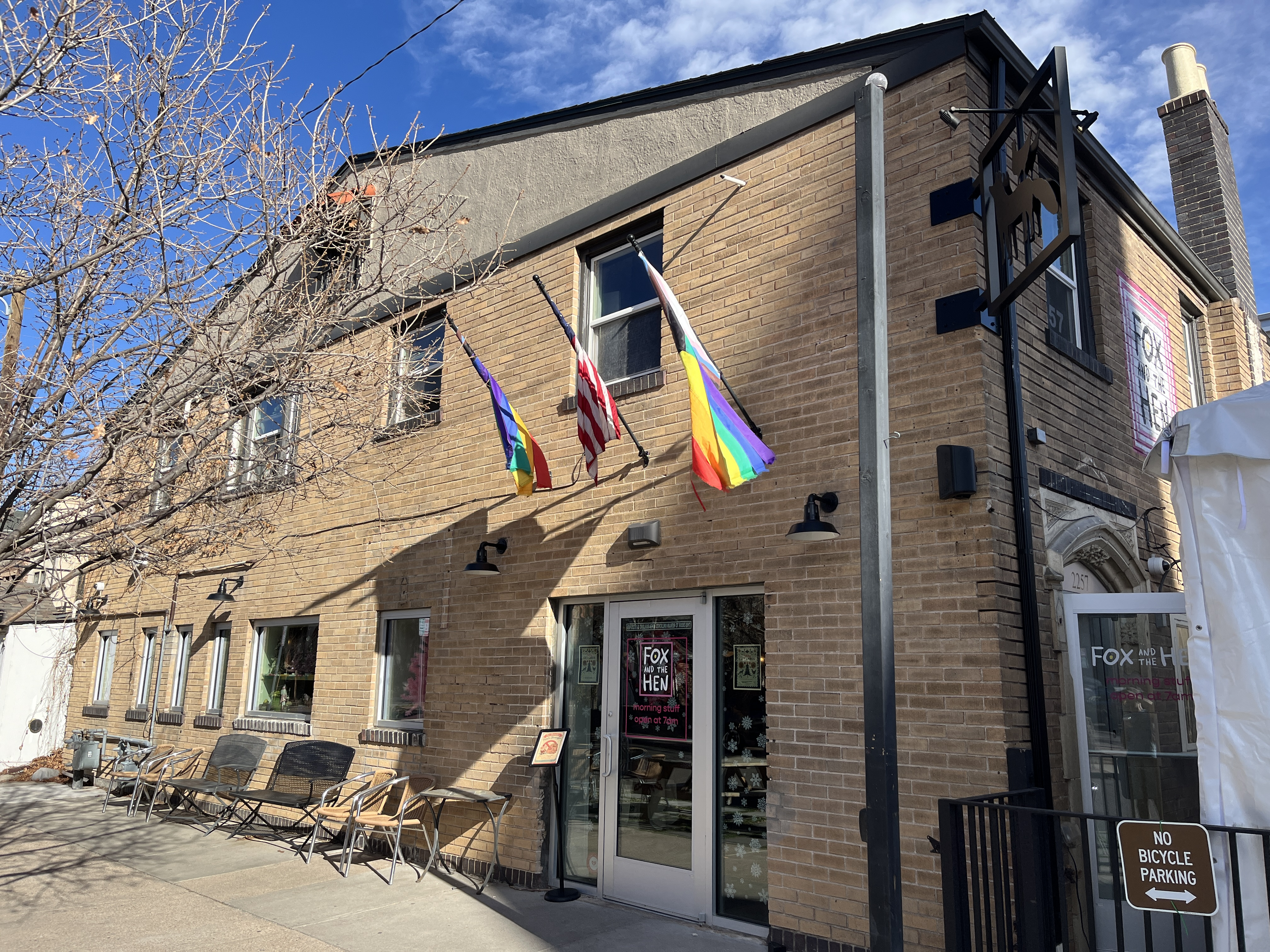
Fox and the Hen

Following is a list of current and former notable restaurants in Denver, Colorado, United States:

- Alma Fonda Fina
- Băo Brewhouse
- Beckon
- Brutø
- Buckhorn Exchange
- Chipotle Mexican Grill
- Church and Union
- Denver Central Market
- La Diabla Pozole y Mezcal
- The Easy Vegan
- Fire on the Mountain
- Fox and the Hen
- Henry's Tavern
- Ian's Pizza
- Kizaki
- Margot
- The Matador
- Mezcaleria Alma
- Molotov Kitschen + Cocktails
- Quiznos
- Sắp Sửa
- Sexy Pizza
- SliceWorks
- Urban Farmer
- Village Inn
- The Wolf's Tailor
- Yuan Wonton
