= Carrie Baird =

Top Chef alum and restaurateur

- Culinary career
- Current restaurants
- The Ginger Pig (2016–present); Fox and the Hen (2023–present)
- Previous restaurants
- Bar Dough (2017–2020); That's What She Said (2020); Rose’s Classic Americana (2020)
- Television shows
- Top Chef: Colorado (2017); Top Chef: Portland (2021)

Carrie Baird is an American chef and businesswoman. She is a Top Chef alumna and restaurateur.

== Education ==
Baird went to Le Cordon Bleu for a culinary arts program and was mentored by Jennifer Jasinski.

== Career ==
In 2016, Baird helped Natascha Hess start The Ginger Pig as a food truck. The following year she became head chef of Bar Dough.

In February 2020 she left Bar Dough and became co-owner and co-head chef with Natascha Hess at 'That’s What She Said.' The following month she added Rose’s Classic Americana (Rosetta Hall) to her restaurant repertoire. This opening happened seven days before coronavirus stay-at-home orders shuttered restaurants for dine-in service.

She is the co-founder and executive chef of Fox and the Hen, which opened in 2023.

=== Television ===
Baird participated in Top Chef: Colorado (season 15) in 2017. She was a judge in Top Chef: Portland (season 18) in 2021. This was the first time the show ever used an elite rotating judging and dining panel. She was a finalist in 2021 CADairy2Go in its cheese and mac category.

=== Recognition and acclaim ===
In 2020, Baird was a finalist in the James Beard Foundation’s: Mountain category (winner was not announced due to the “dire situation” the foundation was in). She was included in Westword’s ‘Four people to watch in Denver’s Culinary Scene in 2021.'

Baird created the famous pork sesame crunch on Ginger Pig’s happy hour menu and baked a cake after building a makeshift oven out of snow when the chefs were tasked with making a dish with camping equipment, cooking in outdoors Colorado.
