= Norman Van Aken =

American chef and author

Norman Van Aken (born 1951 in Diamond Lake, IL) is an American chef and author. Charlie Trotter named Van Aken the "Walt Whitman of American cuisine."

== Published works ==
- Feast of Sunlight 1988
- The Exotic Fruit Book 1995
- Norman's New World Cuisine 1997
- New World Kitchen 2003
- My Key West Kitchen 2012, (with Justin Van Aken)
- No Experience Necessary: The Culinary Odyssey of Chef Norman Van Aken, 2013
- My Florida Kitchen, 2017

== Awards and honors ==
In 2006, Van Aken was honored as one of the "Founders of New American Cuisine," alongside Alice Waters, Paul Prudhomme, and Mark Miller at Spain's International Summit of Gastronomy.
