= Top Chef Family Style =

American streaming television series

- Genre: Reality competition; Cooking show
- Presented by: Meghan Trainor
- Judges: Marcus Samuelsson
- Country of origin: United States
- Original language: English
- No. of seasons: 1
- No. of episodes: 14

Production
- Executive producers: Claire Kosloff; Hillary Olsen; Tracey Tong
- Producer: Doneen Arquines
- Production company: Magical Elves

Original release
- Network: Peacock
- Release: September 9 – December 2, 2021

Related
- Top Chef

Top Chef Family Style is an American reality television series and a spin-off of Bravo's Top Chef series. The show features young chefs teaming up with adult family members to compete in culinary challenges for a US$100,000 prize. The series was ordered in May 2021 by streaming service Peacock. It is hosted by Meghan Trainor with Marcus Samuelsson serving as head judge. The series premiered on September 9, 2021, and concluded on December 2, 2021. In the season finale, niece and uncle Delilah and Daniel "Danny" Flores were declared the winners, with daughter and mother Anika and Anupama "Anu" Kumar placing as runners-up. In 2022, the second episode "Truffles, Caviar & Prawns -- Oh My!" received the James Beard Foundation Award for Reality or Competition Visual Media.

== Contestants ==
Top Chef Family Style features 13 pairs of contestants, referred to as "duos". The cast includes the youngest and oldest competitors to appear in the Top Chef franchise.

Names	Ages	Relationship	Hometown
Kiran Alwy & Moid Alwy	14, 42	Daughter & Father	St. Louis Park, Minnesota
Milan Bhayana & Chandrani Ghosh	15, 50	Son & Mother	Chevy Chase, Maryland
Khalil Blue & Willie Blue	13, 41	Son & Father	Houston, Texas
Ainsley Crouse & Hayley Crouse	11, 40	Daughter & Mother	Douglassville, Pennsylvania
Jack Cruickshank & Bobbie Lopez	12, 51	Son & Mother	Phoenix, Arizona
Taylor Ellison & Elizabeth Frame Ellison	9, 38	Son & Mother	San Francisco, California
Delilah Flores & Daniel "Danny" Flores	13, 24	Niece & Uncle	Ontario, California
Kaj Friis-Hecht & Liz Thorpe	14, 42	Nephew & Aunt	New Orleans, Louisiana
Ocean Kanekoa & Jaydene Kanekoa	15, 34	Brother & Sister	Kamuela, Hawaii
Eva Kopelman & Jenn Kopelman	14, 55	Daughter & Mother	Long Island, New York
Anika Kumar & Anupama "Anu" Kumar	12, 46	Daughter & Mother	Palo Alto, California
Brooke Nathanson & Carol Weiss	12, 75	Granddaughter & Grandmother	Ashland, Massachusetts
Kennedy Torres & Rosie Torres	15, 41	Daughter & Mother	Palmer, Alaska

== Contestant progress ==
Episode #		1	2	3	4	5	6	7	8	9	10	11	12	13	14
Quickfire Challenge Winners		Eva & Jenn	Milan & Chandrani	—N/a	Delilah & Danny	Kaj & Liz	Khalil & Willie	—N/a	Ocean & Jaydene	—N/a	Ocean & Jaydene^{1}	Delilah & Danny^{1}	Delilah & Danny^{1}	Ocean & Jaydene^{1}	—N/a
Duos		Elimination Challenge Results													
1	Delilah & Danny	IN	WIN	HIGH	HIGH	HIGH	HIGH	IN	WIN	WIN	LOW	HIGH	IN^{4}	WIN	WINNERS
2	Anika & Anu	IN	IN	LOW	LOW	WIN	HIGH	HIGH	HIGH	IN	LOW	LOW	IN^{4}	LOW	RUNNERS-UP
3	Ocean & Jaydene	WIN	IN	HIGH	IN	LOW^{3}	WIN	IN	IN	IN	WIN	WIN	IN^{4}	OUT	
4	Kennedy & Rosie	HIGH	IN	HIGH	IN	IN	LOW	WIN	IN	HIGH	HIGH	OUT			
5	Khalil & Willie	IN	IN	HIGH	IN	IN	IN	IN	HIGH	LOW	OUT				
6	Eva & Jenn	IN	IN	WIN	HIGH	HIGH	LOW	IN	LOW	OUT					
7	Kaj & Liz	LOW	HIGH	LOW	WIN	IN	IN	LOW	OUT						
8	Jack & Bobbie	HIGH	HIGH	LOW	LOW	LOW^{3}	IN	OUT							
9	Milan & Chandrani	IN	LOW	LOW	IN	LOW^{3}	OUT								
10	Kiran & Moid	LOW	LOW	HIGH	OUT										
11	Brooke & Carol	IN	IN	WDR^{2}											
12	Taylor & Elizabeth	IN	OUT												
13	Ainsley & Hayley	OUT													

^Note 1: The duo did not receive immunity for winning the Quickfire Challenge.
^Note 2: In Episode 3, Brooke suffered from heat exhaustion during the Elimination Challenge, forcing her and Carol to withdraw from the competition.
^Note 3: In Episodes 5, the judges decided not to eliminate any duos.
^Note 4: In Episode 12, the judges did not declare a winner for the Elimination Challenge and all three duos advanced to the next round.

(WINNERS) The duo won the season.
(RUNNERS-UP) The duo was the runner-up for the season.
(WIN) The duo won the Elimination Challenge.
(HIGH) The duo was selected as one of the top entries in the Elimination Challenge, but did not win.
(IN) The duo was not selected as one of the top or bottom entries in the Elimination Challenge and was safe.
(LOW) The duo was selected as one of the bottom entries in the Elimination Challenge, but was not eliminated.
(OUT) The duo lost the Elimination Challenge.
(WDR) The duo voluntarily withdrew from the competition.

== Episodes ==
No.	Title	Original release date
1	"Welcome to the Family"	September 9, 2021
Quickfire Challenge: The duos created dishes showcasing their favorite culinary pairing. The winning duo received immunity from elimination.: Winner: Eva & Jenn ("Grilled Cheese & Tomato Soup" - Mozzarella in Carrozza with Tomato Bisque); Elimination Challenge: The duos were asked to elevate one of their own family recipes. The winning duo received a trip to the Food & Wine test kitchen. Top Chef: California contestant Kwame Onwuachi and his mother Jewel Robinson served as guest judges.: Winner: Ocean & Jaydene (Kalua Pork, Lomi Lomi Salmon & Purple Sweet Potato Purée); Eliminated: Ainsley & Hayley (Grilled Lamb Chops with Potato Turnip Purée, Roasted Carrots & Mint Sauce)
2	"Truffles, Caviar & Prawns -- Oh My!"	September 9, 2021
Quickfire Challenge: The duos were tasked with putting their own spin on Eggs Benedict. However, before cooking, one member of each duo was required to present a perfectly poached egg to guest judge Nancy Silverton. Only the first six contestants to poach their eggs correctly were able to move onto the second part of the challenge. The winning duo received immunity from elimination.: Winner: Milan & Chandrani ("Elevated" Eggs Benedict on Homemade Biscuit with Pancetta & Mushrooms); Elimination Challenge: The duos created luxurious dishes highlighting at least one of the following high-end ingredients: Royal Ossetra caviar, Sicilian pistachios, Kobe beef, manuka honey, jamón ibérico, black truffles, heritage pork, sea urchin, Santa Barbara spot prawns, and 25-year aged balsamic vinegar. Actor Jesse Tyler Ferguson and chef Josiah Citrin served as guest judges.: Winner: Delilah & Danny ("Seafood Boil" - Lobster & Prawn Bisque in Sweet Corn Purée, Scalloped Potatoes & Spot Prawn); Eliminated: Taylor & Elizabeth ("Truffle-ific" Tomato Soup & Tiny Grilled Cheese with Truffle Oil & Salt)
3	"No Pig Skins Allowed"	September 16, 2021
Elimination Challenge: The duos competed in a tournament-style tailgate party, cooking plant-based foods for Los Angeles Rams linebacker Kenny Young, social media influencer and guest judge Tabitha Brown, the members of the Los Angeles Rams' 2021 draft class, and 50 other partygoers. The tournament consisted of three rounds. All eleven duos first cooked in the "wildcard round", creating appetizer platters. The top six duos from the wildcard round then competed in the "championship round", making burgers. The duo with the judges' favorite dish in the championship round was declared the winner. The winning duo received a trip and two tickets to a Sunday night football game of their choice. On the other hand, the bottom five duos from the wildcard round competed in the "Hail Mary round", preparing grilled plates. The duo with the judges' least favorite dish in the Hail Mary round was eliminated.: Winner: Eva & Jenn (Chickpea Herb Burger with Dill Aioli & Pickled Red Onions); Eliminated: Brooke & Carol^{2}
4	"Chill Factor"	September 23, 2021
Quickfire Challenge: The duos had to make either sweet or savory pies using commonly wasted foods, such as apples, carrots, and ground beef, for guest judge Sherry Yard. The pies were also required to incorporate Hellmann's mayonnaise. The winning duo received immunity from elimination and US$10,000.: Winner: Delilah & Danny ("Everything but the Sink" Picadillo Pie made with Broken Tortilla Roux); Elimination Challenge: The duos created elevated frozen meals that could be reheated in a microwave. Top Chef Masters alumna Susan Feniger and Top Chef: New Orleans finalist/Top Chef: Charleston runner-up Shirley Chung served as guest judges.: Winner: Kaj & Liz (Boeuf Bourguignon with Cauliflower Purée & Bacon Vinegar Kale); Eliminated: Kiran & Moid (Beef Kebab with Red Pepper Sauce, Creamed Cauliflower & Cilantro Lime Rice)
5	"Sink or Swim"	September 30, 2021
Quickfire Challenge: The duos created original dishes that could go viral on social media, along with accompanying videos, for guest judge Jessica Woo. The winning duo received immunity from elimination.: Winner: Kaj & Liz (Carrot Dog with Crispy Onions); Elimination Challenge: The duos, split into three teams, crafted menus highlighting sustainable seafood. Each team was required to serve three courses showcasing mollusks, crustaceans, and trash fish, respectively. Chef Michael Cimarusti and Top Chef: Colorado contestant Claudette Zepeda served as guest judges.: Blue Team: Kennedy & Rosie, Khalil & Willie, Ocean & Jaydene; Coral Team: Anika & Anu, Delilah & Danny, Eva & Jenn; Green Team: Jack & Bobbie, Kaj & Liz, Milan & Chandrani; Winner: Anika & Anu (Crispy Rockfish with Sunchoke Purée, White Wine Lemon Caper Butter Sauce & Grilled Asparagus); Eliminated: N/A^{3}
6	"Look and Siwa I Did!"	October 7, 2021
Quickfire Challenge: For a State Farm-sponsored challenge, the duos were assigned pantries, decorated as houses, which each contained unique ingredients. If the contestants required more, they would have to "be good neighbors" and ask others to borrow their ingredients. The duos needed to make dishes that reflected their own neighborhoods, past or present. Top Chef: Texas contestant Nyesha Arrington served as a guest judge. The winning duo received immunity from elimination and US$10,000.: Winner: Khalil & Willie ("Detroit by Way of Houston" - Coney Island Dog with Chili Cheese Fries); Elimination Challenge: The duos created desserts for a fire and ice-themed party. Pastry chef and chocolatier Chris Ford and dancer and singer JoJo Siwa served as guest judges.: Winner: Ocean & Jaydene (Coconut Tres Leches with Blue Vanilla Macadamia Nut Ice Cream & Passion Fruit Curd); Eliminated: Milan & Chandrani (Shortbread Brownie with Flaming Meringue & Vanilla Ice Cream)
7	"Tag Team Turmoil"	October 14, 2021
Elimination Challenge: The duos competed in a WWE-themed tournament. For the first "battle royale" round, the duos were split into four teams led by WWE wrestlers The Miz, Naomi, Maryse, and Drew McIntyre. Each team received a mystery ingredient from their assigned wrestler and needed to work together to create a single dish highlighting their ingredient. The team with the judges' favorite dish from the battle royale then competed in the "championship tag team match", where they faced off against each other to produce any dish of their choosing. The duos' cooking stations were set up in the middle of a wrestling ring. Only one member of each duo was allowed inside the ring at any given time, forcing their partner to stand outside the ropes and watch. They were also required to switch places by tagging each other out a minimum of three times. The winning duo received four tickets to WrestleMania. The team with the judges' least favorite dish from the battle royale competed in the "signature move elimination match", cooking their signature dishes with no restrictions. Top Chef: Miami finalist/Top Chef: All-Stars L.A. contestant Brian Malarkey and Top Chef: California runner-up Amar Santana served as guest judges.: Team Drew: Anika & Anu, Kennedy & Rosie; Team Maryse: Jack & Bobbie, Kaj & Liz; Team Miz: Khalil & Willie, Ocean & Jaydene; Team Naomi: Delilah & Danny, Eva & Jenn; Winner: Kennedy & Rosie (Green Curry with Chicken, Basil Oil & Jasmine Rice); Eliminated: Jack & Bobbie (Fried Chicken with Miso Potatoes & Collard Greens)
8	"Spine Tingling Treats"	October 21, 2021
Quickfire Challenge: The duos created Halloween-themed amuse-bouches. Prior to cooking, the duos had to guess the identities of ten mystery ingredients, using only their sense of touch, by sticking their hands into several "graves". If guessed correctly, the contestants gained access to the ingredients. The final dish needed to incorporate at least two mystery ingredients. Top Chef Masters Season 4 winner Chris Cosentino served as a guest judge. The winning duo received immunity from elimination.: Winner: Ocean & Jaydene (Chicken Coconut Curry with Tofu & Eggplant Bite); Elimination Challenge: The duos were tasked with catering a Halloween party. First, the duos picked costumes to wear while cooking. They then needed to conceptualize a dish that reflected their costume choice. Chris Cosentino and singer-songwriter Ester Dean served as guest judges. The winning duo received a trip for two to Universal Orlando.: Winner: Delilah & Danny ("Shipwreck" - Fried Octopus with Squid Ink Dumplings & Pickled Radish in Seafood Broth); Eliminated: Kaj & Liz ("Dragon's Eye" - Beet & Bleu Cheese Ravioli with Beets, Mushrooms & Red Wine Demi-Glace)
9	"Restaurant Wars: Top Chef Family Style"	October 28, 2021
Elimination Challenge: The duos, separated into two teams, competed in Top Chef's traditional Restaurant Wars challenge. The teams were given two days to plan and execute their restaurant concepts. Their menus needed to include at least two appetizers, two entrées, and one dessert. The teams also had to designate an expeditor and front of house. The contestants worked with a designer to help decorate their restaurants. Top Chef: Kentucky winner Kelsey Barnard Clark and Top Chef: Seattle/Top Chef: Charleston finalist Sheldon Simeon served as guest judges. In a special announcement, Meghan Trainor revealed that the grand prize awarded to the winners of the season would be doubled from US$50,000 to $100,000.: Fisherman & Farmer: Delilah & Danny, Kennedy & Rosie, Ocean & Jaydene; Appetizer: Rainbow Aguachile with Mango Habanero Sauce (Delilah & Danny); Appetizer: Harvest Salad with Beets, Arugula & Calamari Croutons (Kennedy & Rosie); Entrée: Fishermen Stew with Poached Rockfish & Saffron Sourdough Toast (Team Dish); Entrée: Lamb with Black Garlic Mash & Sous Vide Vegetable Medley (Ocean & Jaydene); Dessert: Blood Orange Sorbet with Salted Crumble (Team Dish); Southern Bleu: Anika & Anu, Eva & Jenn, Khalil & Willie; Appetizer: Crab Stuffed Mushrooms with Roasted Red Pepper Sauce (Anika & Anu); Appetizer: Fried Green Tomatoes with Balsamic Reduction (Team Dish); Entrée: Braised Oxtail with White Grits & Collard Greens (Eva & Jenn); Entrée: Roasted Chicken with Lentils, Sautéed Cabbage & Balsamic Sauce (Khalil & Willie); Dessert: Chocolate Pecan Pie with Bourbon Whipped Cream (Eva & Jenn); Dessert: Peach Cobbler with Salted Caramel Ice Cream (Team Dish); Winning Team: Fisherman & Farmer; Winner: Delilah & Danny; Losing Team: Southern Bleu; Eliminated: Eva & Jenn
10	"This Is How We Roll"	November 4, 2021
Quickfire Challenge: The duos made miniature sized dishes for Top Chef: Boston winner Mei Lin and former professional basketball player Baron Davis. The winning duo received an advantage in the Elimination Challenge. Beginning with this Quickfire Challenge, immunity from elimination was no longer available as a reward.: Winner: Ocean & Jaydene (Mini Miso Ramen with Teriyaki Beef & Quail Eggs); Elimination Challenge: The duos created sushi menus featuring three different techniques: maki, temaki, and nigiri. The menus were served omakase-style to the judges, including Top Chef: Portland runner-up Shota Nakajima. The duos had to prepare their sushi directly in front of the judges; their presentation and customer service factored into their overall score. As the winners of the Quickfire Challenge, Ocean & Jaydene received exclusive use of three ingredients: Royal Ossetra caviar, uni, and fresh wasabi. The winning duo received two sets of Cangshan knives.: Winner: Ocean & Jaydene ("Kīlauea" Maki Roll with Cured Ahi Belly, Roe, Shrimp Tempura, Avocado & Charred Uni Aioli; Ahi Poke Temaki with Fried Garlic; Kampachi Nigiri with Green Onion & Caviar); Eliminated: Khalil & Willie (Ginger Soy Salmon Maki with Mango & Spicy Mayo; Shrimp Po' Boy Temaki with Celery, Bell Pepper & Remoulade; Candied Pork Belly Nigiri)
11	"Science Fair"	November 11, 2021
Quickfire Challenge: The duos were required to use soft drinks in their dishes. The six available flavors were root beer, ginger ale, pepper soda, orange, cola, and lemon lime. Top Chef: Chicago runner-up/Top Chef: All-Stars winner Richard Blais served as a guest judge. The winning duo received an advantage in the Elimination Challenge.: Winner: Delilah & Danny (Orangesicle Cupcake with Whipped Cream, Orange Soda Reduction & Orange Macaron); Elimination Challenge: The duos were asked to create dishes for a culinary science fair that showcased at least two of the following molecular gastronomy techniques: gelification, spherification, siphon whipping, smoking, powderizing, deep freezing, sous vide cooking, and emulsification. As the winners of the Quickfire Challenge, Delilah & Danny were able to prohibit the other duos from using one technique of their choosing; they chose spherification. The dishes were served to 50 guests, including Richard Blais, author and molecular gastronomist Nathan Myhrvold, and Saved by the Bell cast members Elizabeth Berkley Lauren, John Michael Higgins, Josie Totah, Haskiri Velazquez, and Alycia Pascual-Peña. The winning duo received copies of Myhrvold's books Modernist Cuisine, Modernist Bread, and Modernist Pizza.: Winner: Ocean & Jaydene (Deconstructed Caesar Salad - Sous Vide Chicken, Anchovy & Lemon Jellies, Parmesan Foam & Chicken Skin Tuile); Eliminated: Kennedy & Rosie (Short Cake with Peach Jelly Cubes, Blueberry Coulis, Powderized Macadamia Nuts & Vanilla Bean Whipped Cream)
12	"Thanksgiving Family Style"	November 18, 2021
Quickfire Challenge: One member of each duo raced to complete three mise en place tasks: husk and remove the kernels from five corncobs, peel five sweet potatoes, and crack half a cup of pecans. Once the tasks were done, the other member was responsible for cooking a dish highlighting at least one of the three mise en place ingredients. The winning duo received a set of Smeg cookware and appliances.: Winner: Delilah & Danny (Corn Cheese Dip with Chorizo); Elimination Challenge: The duos worked as a team to create a Thanksgiving feast from scratch. Aside from the turkey, which was prepared by Marcus Samuelsson, each duo was responsible for at least two items on the menu. The dishes needed to reflect their family's heritage and holiday traditions. The duos' family members, Top Chef: Boston finalist/Top Chef: All-Stars L.A. winner Melissa King, and pastry chef Amirah Kassem joined the judges for dinner.: Winner: N/A^{4}; Eliminated: N/A^{4}
13	"The Hall of Fame"	November 25, 2021
Quickfire Challenge: The duos were tasked with recreating one dish of their choosing from the "Top Chef Quickfire Hall of Fame", a list of winning Quickfire Challenge dishes from past seasons of the show. They were not provided a recipe; instead, the duos were given tablets allowing them to videocall the Top Chef alumnus who originally created their chosen dish. The duos were only allowed to speak with the alumni for the first ten minutes of the challenge. Top Chef: Seattle runner-up/Top Chef: Charleston winner Brooke Williamson served as a guest judge. The winning duo received an advantage in the Elimination Challenge.: Winner: Ocean & Jaydene (Tiffany Derry - Beef Tenderloin Salad with Cilantro, Mint, Basil & Chimichurri Sauce); Elimination Challenge: The duos were presented with three boxes containing ingredients inspired by celebrity chefs Emeril Lagasse (Creole/Cajun cuisine), Wolfgang Puck (French/California cuisine), and Lidia Bastianich (Italian-American cuisine). After choosing one box, each duo had to create a dish paying tribute to their assigned celebrity chef. As the winners of the Quickfire Challenge, Ocean & Jaydene were able to choose their box first. Top Chef: Boston runner-up/Top Chef: All-Stars L.A. finalist Gregory Gourdet and chefs Dominique Crenn and Tim Hollingsworth served as guest judges.: Winner: Delilah & Danny (Emeril Lagasse - Andouille & Pecan Crusted Red Snapper with Creole Gravy, Fried Okra & Fish Skin Chip); Eliminated: Ocean & Jaydene (Lidia Bastianich - Osso Buco with Potato Gnocchi, Broccoli Rabe & Bone Marrow Toast)
14	"Finale"	December 2, 2021
Elimination Challenge: The final two duos created three-course progressive meals highlighting their journeys through Top Chef Family Style. Eliminated competitors Ocean & Jaydene and Kennedy & Rosie were brought back to provide assistance as sous chefs. Delilah & Danny were assisted by Ocean & Jaydene, and Anika & Anu were assisted by Kennedy & Rosie. Top Chef host Padma Lakshmi, Top Chef head judge Tom Colicchio, Top Chef: Chicago winner Stephanie Izard, Top Chef: New Orleans runner-up Nina Compton, Top Chef Masters alumna Susan Feniger, and chef Michael Cimarusti joined the finale meal as guest judges.: Delilah & Danny: First Course: Coconut Ají Amarillo Ceviche with Plantain Chips; Second Course: Al Pastor Trompo with Tzatziki, Salsa & Tortillas; Third Course: Cuatro Leches, Piloncillo Whipped Cream & Buñuelos with Prickly Pear & Kiwi Coulis; Anika & Anu: First Course: Seafood Samosas with Coconut Cilantro Chutney & Mango Sauce; Second Course: Indian Steak Au Poivre with Fondant Potatoes, Green Peppercorn Curry Sauce & Celeriac Foam; Third Course: Rose & Cardamom Ice Cream Profiterole with Hot Fudge, Pistachio Brittle & Rose Water Caviar; Winner: Delilah & Danny; Runner-up: Anika & Anu
