= Peter Detkin =

American patent attorney

Peter N. Detkin is an American patent attorney and co-founder of Intellectual Ventures. He is a senior advisor at Sherpa Technology Group.

== Biography ==
He graduated from the University of Pennsylvania, with a B.S.E.E. in 1982 and J.D. in 1985. In 1987, Detkin joined Wilson Sonsini Goodrich & Rosati in Palo Alto, California, as the firm's first patent attorney, becoming a partner in 1992.

Detkin later joined Intel as vice president and assistant general counsel, overseeing patent licensing, litigation and competition law matters. In 2000, he co-founded Intellectual Ventures with Nathan Myhrvold, Edward Jung and Greg Gorder. During his time at Intel, Detkin helped popularize the term patent troll to describe certain patent infringement claims. In 2011, Detkin and Intellectual Ventures were featured in the This American Life episode When Patents Attack!, which covered patent licensing and litigation.

He is an inactive member of the bars of California and New York, and licensed to represent inventors before the U.S. Patent Office.

Detkin serves on the Board of Overseers for University of Pennsylvania School of Engineering and Applied Science. He provided support for the Department of Electrical and Systems Engineering to build a new principle teaching laboratory, The Detkin Lab. He also contributed a gift to Penn Law School to establish an intellectual property and technology legal clinic, Detkin Intellectual Property and Technology Legal Clinic.

Detkin previously served as president of the Law Foundation of Silicon Valley, a nonprofit organization providing legal services to low-income individuals and families.

In January 2017, Detkin joined Sherpa Technology Group as a senior advisor.

In July 2023, Detkin became chair of the board of directors of Humane Society Silicon Valley.

== Personal life ==
Detkin is married to Michelle Oates Detkin, a retired attorney who previously worked in real estate and commercial law at Intel. The couple live in Los Altos, California.
