= Modernist Cuisine =

Book by Nathan Myhrvold

Modernist Cuisine: The Art and Science of Cooking
- The five volumes of Modernist Cuisine
- Author: Nathan Myhrvold with Chris Young and Maxime Bilet
- Cover artist: Ryan Matthew Smith
- Language: English
- Publisher: The Cooking Lab
- Publication date: 14 March 2011
- Publication place: United States
- Media type: Print (hardcover)
- Pages: 2,438
- ISBN: 978-0-9827610-0-7
- OCLC: 711381030
- LC Class: TX651 .M94 2011
- Followed by: Modernist Bread
- Website: modernistcuisine.com/books/modernist-cuisine/

Modernist Cuisine: The Art and Science of Cooking is a 2011 cookbook by Nathan Myhrvold, Chris Young and Maxime Bilet. The book is an encyclopedia and a guide to the science of contemporary cooking.

It is notable for the use of elaborate equipment that many non-professional kitchens lacked at the time (sous vide machines, vacuum-chamber sealers, culinary centrifuges, culinary torches, high-precision gram scales) and for its lush photography, particularly its tricky cross-sectional images of ovens, barbecue grills, and woks, apparently caught in the act of cooking the food inside them, though this isn't physically possible; rather, each individual part of the cooking apparatus was hand-cut in a nearby metal shop and then photographed, the food—already cut in half—was shot at high shutter speed, and the images of both were combined into one in post production.

The book was not published by a traditional publishing house. With no publishers thinking that the book would be profitable, Myhrvold and the culinary research and development lab known as The Cooking Lab published the book themselves. Its six volumes cover history and fundamentals, techniques and equipment, animals and plants, ingredients and preparation, plated dish recipes and a kitchen manual containing brief information on useful topics. At the Gourmand World Cookbook Awards 2010 the book was named "the most important cookbook of the first ten years of the 21st century" and was introduced into the group's hall of fame. Containing 2,438 pages and weighing in at 23.7 kilograms (52 lb), the work has been described as the "cookbook to end all cookbooks."

In 2012, Modernist Cuisine was condensed and adapted as the single-volume Modernist Cuisine at Home, better suited for the home cook, but which continues to feature the scientific recipe layout, with ingredients specified in traditional American volumetric units for convenience, as well as the more precise S.I. units of mass better suited to culinary science.

The Modernist Cuisine Team together with chef Francisco Migoya also published the 2,642-page Modernist Bread (2017) and 1,708-page Modernist Pizza (2021).

== History ==
The idea for the book came up when Myhrvold acquired a temperature-controlled water bath for sous vide cooking in 2003. He tried to find information about this new cooking technique, which had been invented in the 1960s and was in use at many restaurants by 2003. He could find only a few articles and one book (in Spanish) on sous vide, however. He posted messages on eGullet, a high-end cooking forum, asking for recipes or sources, but found that the process was poorly understood.

Myhrvold has attended Ecole de Cuisine la Varenne, a cooking school in Burgundy, France and has also cooked part-time at Rover's, a French restaurant in Seattle owned by Thierry Rautureau. He is also a scientist, having earned advanced degrees in geophysics, space physics, and theoretical and mathematical physics, done post-doctoral research with Stephen Hawking at Cambridge University, and worked for many years as the chief technology officer and chief strategist of Microsoft. Drawing on his food and science skills, Myhrvold performed experiments and calculations to generate tables of times and temperatures for cooking various foods sous vide. When he posted these tables to eGullet, answering the question that he himself had asked in that forum about one year earlier, someone suggested that he should write a book. In 2006 he began to do so, but soon realized that he could not write the book he wanted himself, and that it would require a team using proper equipment.

Myhrvold started buying equipment for the research kitchen in the Intellectual Ventures lab. Much of the equipment was standard cooking equipment, but it also included items such as rotor-stator homogenizers, ultrahigh-pressure homogenizers, freeze-dryers, a 50,000 G centrifuge, ultrasonic baths, and rotary evaporators. The laboratory already included other high-tech and industrial equipment, a 100-ton hydraulic press, a large water-jet cutter, an electrical discharge machine, and automated milling machines.

Myhrvold and Wayt Gibbs, an executive editor at Intellectual Ventures who served as the editor-in-chief and project manager for the book, also hired writers and editors, research assistants, photo editors, and an art director. First hired was Chris Young, who had just stopped his work of leading the development kitchen in Heston Blumenthal's restaurant The Fat Duck in England. Young recruited Maxime Bilet, also from The Fat Duck, who led the team of research chefs that developed and tested the 1,522 recipes in the book. Photographer Ryan Matthew Smith joined the team after answering an advert on Craigslist seeking a photo editor. The book team ultimately grew to include more than 50 staff and freelance contributors plus 14 outside experts who reviewed various chapters of the book. At the high point of the project, 36 researchers, chefs, and editors were working simultaneously on the book.

Initially the book was planned to be 150 pages on cooking sous vide in water baths and combi ovens, along with some scientific fundamentals relevant to those techniques. It gradually grew in scope, and by late 2009 the book plan had expanded to 1,500 pages, before finally being printed at 2,438 pages. The book cost more than US$1,000,000 to produce the first printing of 6,000 copies, which sold out shortly after the publication date in March 2011. In April 2011, The Cooking Lab ordered a second printing of 25,000 copies.

The Cooking Lab published a less expensive, two-volume sequel, titled Modernist Cuisine at Home, coauthored by Myhrvold and Bilet, in October 2012. The Photography of Modernist Cuisine, with 405 photographs and background details for each, including 127 from the 6-volume set and unpublished ones, was published in 2013.

== Structure ==
Modernist Cuisine consists of five major volumes plus a spiral-bound kitchen manual, which reprints recipes and reference tables from the major volumes on water-resistant paper for use while cooking.

1. History and Fundamentals, includes a chapter that chronicles the intellectual history of culinary movements, culminating with a detailed history of the Modernist movement as it appeared in cooking beginning in the 1980s. Also in Volume 1 are chapters on microbiology, food safety, food and health, heat and energy, and the physics of food and water.
2. Techniques and Equipment, includes a chapter on the science and techniques of traditional cooking, which it explains by making extensive use of illustrations and photography. This volume also contains chapters on modern cooking approaches, including baking in combi ovens and water-vapor ovens, cooking sous-vide, and cooking with a wide range of advanced equipment and ingredients, from homogenizers and vacuum pumps to liquid nitrogen and dry ice.
3. Animals and Plants, contains just two chapters: one on meat and another on plant foods. Scientific fundamentals about these ingredients are presented along with basic cooking techniques, advanced cooking techniques, and many recipes.
4. Ingredients and Preparations, explains the use of ingredients more commonly associated with Modernist cooking, including thickening and gelling agents, emulsions, and foams. This volume also contains chapters on wine and coffee.
5. Plated-Dish Recipes, consists primarily of 48 more complex recipes, each of which includes both a main dish and various accompaniments. The index to the set appears in this volume, along with two glossaries and a set of reference tables.

== Response ==
The critical reception was generally positive, citing detail on molecular gastronomic techniques and strong illustrations. However, the book was criticized by reviewers in the New York Times and the New Yorker for being dryly written and of limited utility to cooks without an expensive array of kitchen tools at their disposal. Two years after it was first published, a reviewer in Forbes magazine pronounced Modernist Cuisine and its two successor books "this decade's most influential work about food" and also likely the most profitable set of books in the genre in recent years.

== Awards ==
In 2010, the book was inducted into the Gourmand Cookbook Hall of Fame. In 2012 the book won the James Beard Foundation's "Cookbook of the Year" and "Cooking from a Professional Point of View" awards, and the International Association of Culinary Professionals' "Professional Kitchens", "Design" and "Visionary Achievement" awards.

== Exhibition ==
The Photography of Modernist Cuisine: The Exhibition opened at Pacific Science Center on October 26, 2013. This is a photo exhibition that features food processes, large scale views, and modern cooking techniques.
