= The Road Ahead (Gates book) =

1995 book by Bill Gates

- Author: Bill Gates, with Nathan Myhrvold and Peter Rinearson
- Cover artist: Laurie Rippon (jacket design); Annie Leibovitz (photograph)
- Language: English
- Subject: Information technology, information superhighway, computer networks, telecommunications
- Genre: Nonfiction
- Publisher: Viking Penguin
- Publication date: November 24, 1995; October 1996 ("Completely revised and up-to-date.")
- Publication place: United States
- Media type: Hardback with companion CD-ROM
- Pages: 286
- ISBN: 978-0-670-77289-6
- OCLC: 33281938
- Followed by: Business @ the Speed of Thought
- Website: https://archive.org/details/roadahead00gate/mode/2up

The Road Ahead is a book written by Bill Gates, co-founder and former CEO of Microsoft; Nathan Myhrvold, Microsoft executive; and former Microsoft vice president Peter Rinearson. Published in November 1995, then substantially revised about a year later, The Road Ahead summarized the implications of the personal computing revolution and described a future profoundly changed by the arrival of a global information superhighway.

Gates received a $2.5-million advance for his book and money from subsidiary rights sales; all his proceeds were donated to "encourage the use of technology in education administered through the National Foundation for the Improvement of Education," a foundation created by the National Education Association.

== Content differences between hardback and trade editions ==
The hardback edition saw the Internet as one of the "important precursors of the information highway...suggestive of [its] future" (p. 89); he noted that the "popularity of the Internet is the most important single development in the world of computing since the IBM PC was introduced in 1981" (p. 91) but "today's Internet is not the information highway I imagine, although you can think of it as the beginning of the highway": the information highway he envisioned would be as different from the Internet as the Oregon Trail was to Interstate 84. (p. 95)

The revised edition was published in October 1996 as a trade paperback, with the subtitle "Completely revised and up-to-date.".

Both editions came with a CD-ROM that contained the text of the book and supplemental information. The hardback was published by Viking, and the paperback by Penguin, an affiliate of Viking. Numerous publishers around the world produced translated versions of the book.

== Collaborators ==
One of Gates' coauthors, Nathan Myhrvold, was a computer scientist and Microsoft vice president who for a time oversaw Microsoft's research efforts and later co-founded Intellectual Ventures, an intellectual property company. The other co-author, Peter Rinearson, was a Pulitzer Prize winner and entrepreneur who later founded and sold an Internet company and became a Microsoft vice president.

== Quotes ==
- "Anyone expecting an autobiography or a treatise on what it's like to have been as lucky as I have been will be disappointed." (p. xiii)
- "Computers are great because when you're working with them you get immediate results that let you know if your program works. It's feedback you don't get from many other things." (p. 2)
- "Corporations will redesign their nervous systems to rely on the networks that reach every member of the organization and beyond into the world of suppliers, consultants and customers." (1996: 153)
- "We'll find ourselves in a new world of friction, overhead capitalism, in which market information will be plentiful and transaction costs low. It will be a shopper's heaven" (1996: 181).
- "The obvious mathematical breakthrough would be development of an easy way to factor large prime numbers." (p. 265)

== Publicity ==
This is as big as it gets in nonfiction for us. It's pretty exciting.

— Paul Slovak, vice president of publicity for Viking

The publisher's $1 million promotional budget was one of its largest ever, rivaling that given to My American Journey, an autobiography of Gen. Colin Powell also released at the time. The first excerpts from the book were published on November 19 by The Sunday Times in the United Kingdom (only a few months after Microsoft, in a Windows 95 promotion, "paid for an entire daily press run of The Times and gave it away to readers") and in the November 27th, edition of Newsweek. Accompanying the publicity was a "one-day lay down", a "very expensive marketing technique" where a book is placed on sale in multiple countries on the same day (November 24, in this case), giving the book "an almost sure shot at the No. 1 spot on best-seller lists." The Road Ahead got a first printing of 850,000 books in North America and several hundred thousand overseas.

It was early enough in the history of the World Wide Web that The New York Times thought it newsworthy to report that Gates was going to "conduct on-line forums to promote the book" and Penguin had created a "Bill Gates web site on the Internet (http://www.penguin.com/roadahead), which will feature information and an audio clip about the book, printed excerpts and quotes from reviews, as well as information about the CD-ROM."

Gates publicized the book's release during a five-day tour of Los Angeles, San Francisco, New York, Washington, London and Paris, which included appearances on Nightline, Talking with David Frost, The Today Show, the Late Show with David Letterman, MTV, Fresh Air, and The NewsHour with Jim Lehrer

== Reception ==
The Road Ahead occupied the top spot on The New York Times' bestseller list for over seven weeks in late 1995 and early 1996, and sold 2.5 million copies.

A reviewer at The Seattle Times (and coauthor of Gates: How Microsoft's Mogul Reinvented an Industry and Made Himself the Richest Man in America, a 1993 biography of Gates), called Gates' coverage of the Internet "weakest of all" the topics Gates covered, saying the "World Wide Web receives just four index citations and is treated as a functional appendage of the Internet (rather than its driving force), and both come off as a subset of the Information Highway, a term Gates uses with abandon."

The New York Times review called the book "bland and tepid" and reading "as if it had been vetted by a committee of Microsoft executives"; it is "little more than a positioning document, sold in book form with accompanying CD-ROM and designed mainly to advance the interests of the Microsoft Corporation." It also said that Gates "has been caught flat-footed by [the Internet's] sudden emergence" and saying the book is "part of Mr. Gates's extensive effort to force his way back into the game before it's too late."

Time magazine, in a December 1995 article about Gates in general rather than his book, said:

Gates is as fearful as he is feared, and these days he worries most about the Internet, Usenet and the World Wide Web, which threaten his software monopoly by shifting the nexus of control from stand-alone computers to the network that connects them. The Internet, by design, has no central operating system that Microsoft or anybody else can patent and license. And its libertarian culture is devoted to open—that is to say, nonproprietary—standards, none of which were set by Microsoft. Gates moved quickly this year to embrace the Net, although it sometimes seemed he was trying to wrap Microsoft's long arms around it.

== Sources ==
Gates, Bill (1996). THE ROAD AHEAD. Penguin Books. ISBN 0670772895. "What is the information highway? How will the new technology change our lives? Do I have to learn to use a computer? Will my job become obsolete? Welcome to The Road Ahead...."

Bill Gates (November 24, 2020). "The Road Ahead after 25 years The predictions I got right and wrong in my first book". www.gatesnotes.com.

"PETER RINEARSON". Nieman Foundation, Harvard University.
