= Nathan Myhrvold =

Chief Technology Officer at Microsoft

Nathan Paul Myhrvold
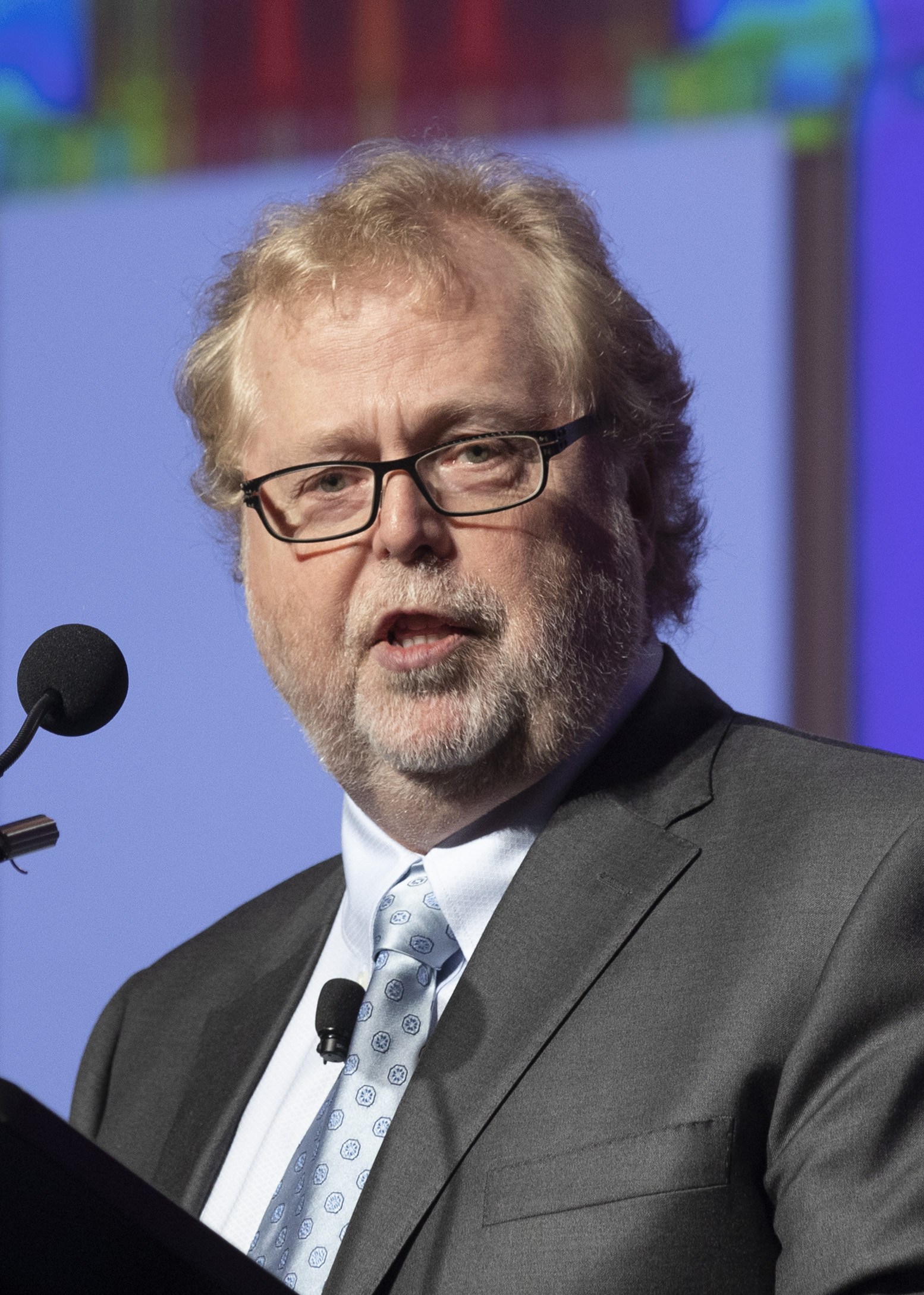
- Myhrvold in 2016
- Born: August 3, 1959 (age 67); Seattle, Washington, US
- Education: University of California, Los Angeles (BS, MS); Princeton University (MS, PhD)
- Spouse: Rosemarie Havranek
- Scientific career
- Workplaces: Intellectual Ventures, University of Cambridge, Microsoft Research
- Website: nathanmyhrvold.com

Nathan Paul Myhrvold (born August 3, 1959) is an American inventor, scientist, and businessman, former Chief Technology Officer at Microsoft, co-founder of Intellectual Ventures and TerraPower, and the principal author of Modernist Cuisine and its successor books.

== Early life and education ==
Myhrvold was born on August 3, 1959, in Seattle, to Norwegian American parents. He was raised in Santa Monica, California, where he attended Mirman School and Santa Monica High School, graduating in 1974, and began college at age 14.

Transferring from Santa Monica College, he studied mathematics (B.Sc.), and geophysics and space physics (Master's) at UCLA. He was awarded a Hertz Foundation Fellowship for graduate study and studied at Princeton University, where he earned a master's degree in mathematical economics and completed a Ph.D. in applied mathematics after completing a doctoral dissertation titled "Vistas in curved space-time quantum field theory" under the supervision of Malcolm Perry. For one year, he held a postdoctoral fellowship at the University of Cambridge working under Stephen Hawking.

== Career ==
=== Early career ===
Myhrvold left Cambridge to co-found a computer startup in Oakland, California. The company, Dynamical Systems Research Inc., sought to produce Mondrian, a clone of IBM's TopView multitasking environment for DOS. Myhrvold served as Dynamical Systems Research's president. Microsoft purchased Dynamical Systems Research in 1986 for $1.5M in stock. Myhrvold worked at Microsoft for 13 years in a variety of executive positions, culminating in his appointment as the company's first chief technology officer in 1996. At Microsoft he founded Microsoft Research in 1991.

=== Intellectual Ventures ===
After Microsoft, in 2000 Myhrvold co-founded Intellectual Ventures, a patent portfolio developer and broker in the areas of technology and energy, which has acquired over 30,000 patents. Intellectual Ventures takes part in the market for inventions and patents, buying patents from companies and inventors under the assumption the patents will be more valuable in the future. Intellectual Ventures has also been granted thousands of patents on inventions conceived on-site by its own teams, which include a number of individuals on the list of prolific inventors. Myhrvold is named as an inventor on more than 900 U.S. patents.

Startup companies spun out of Intellectual Ventures, including TerraPower, Kymeta, Echodyne, Modern Hydrogen, Lumotive, Evolv Technology, and Pivotal Commware, have developed commercial products from Intellectual Ventures' inventions. Through its Global Good unit, which Myhrvold founded in collaboration with Bill Gates, Intellectual Ventures has also invented and produced commercial products, such as improved vaccine coolers and milking cans, aimed at low-income markets in Africa and Asia. However, in most cases, Intellectual Ventures' inventions are limited to the descriptions provided in their patents, which are bundled into portfolios for licensing.

Myhrvold has described his goal for Intellectual Ventures as helping to create a market for patent-backed securities. The company's business practices have caused controversy, however, with some deprecating the firm as a patent troll, accusing the company of stifling innovation by buying patents and then forcing inventors to license their ideas by means of litigation. Myhrvold has publicly defended his firm's practices, arguing that they foster innovation by serving as a marketplace for intellectual property. He has noted that many of the largest companies in Silicon Valley, including Google, Apple, and Facebook, have also bought large patent portfolios and used litigation to protect them, but he has criticized them as focusing too much on creating "tools or toys for rich people." Walt Mossberg interviewed Myhrvold about Intellectual Ventures' role as a "patent troll" during the 10th annual All Things Digital conference.

According to The New York Times, Intellectual Ventures at one point controlled nearly 70,000 intellectual property assets (patents and patents pending) that it has used to generate approximately $3 billion in revenues, primarily in the form of license fees from large corporations. The company responds that it has returned more than $500 million to individual inventors and most of the remaining revenues to its investors.

=== Nuclear power ===
Myhrvold is vice chairman of TerraPower, a spin-out of Intellectual Ventures that is developing a new kind of nuclear reactor, known as a traveling-wave reactor, that is designed to be safer, cheaper, and cleaner than current nuclear power plants. In 2020, the company launched a joint venture with GE Vernova Hitachi Nuclear Energy to build and operate a prototype reactor of this kind that combines a sodium-cooled fast reactor with a molten salt energy storage system. In 2024, TerraPower broke ground at a site in Wyoming where it intends to build its first reactor.

=== Science ===
In addition to his business activities, Myhrvold is a working scientist who has published original, peer-reviewed research in the fields of paleobiology, climate science, and astronomy. A prize-winning nature and wildlife photographer, he has published highly detailed color images of snowflakes and a book of landscape photography titled Natural Wonders: Marvels of Our World. He has also been involved with paleontological research on expeditions with the Museum of the Rockies. His work has appeared in scientific journals including Science, Nature, Paleobiology, PLOS One, and the Physical Review, as well as in Fortune, Time, Scientific American, National Geographic Traveler, and Slate. He and Peter Rinearson helped Bill Gates write The Road Ahead, a book about the future that reached No. 1 on the New York Times bestseller list in 1995 and 1996. Myhrvold has contributed $1 million to the nonprofit SETI Institute in Mountain View, California, for the development of the Allen Telescope Array, which was envisioned to be the most powerful instrument for SETI.

After the Science Museum in London successfully built the computing section of Charles Babbage's Difference Engine #2 in 1991, Myhrvold funded the construction of the output section, which performs both printing and stereotyping of calculated results. He also commissioned the construction of a second complete Difference Engine #2 for himself, which was on display at the Computer History Museum in Mountain View, from May 10, 2008, to January 31, 2016, and currently resides in the Intellectual Ventures Laboratory.

In research presented at scientific conferences and published in the astronomy journal Icarus, Myhrvold has been a vocal critic of procedures and results about asteroid diameters published by the NEOWISE team. A 2016 preprint of his work on the subject received wide press coverage prompting NASA to release a public statement defending their published research and pointing out the lack of peer review and methodological errors in Myhrvold's preprint. However, the preprint was published in the peer-reviewed literature in 2017 and Myhrvold subsequently published results for thousands of asteroids. The WISE team's response to Myhrvold's 2017 article did not settle the dispute but acknowledged clerical and software errors brought to light by Myhrvold's work. Others have reported potential issues with uncertainties in WISE measurements.

=== Cooking ===
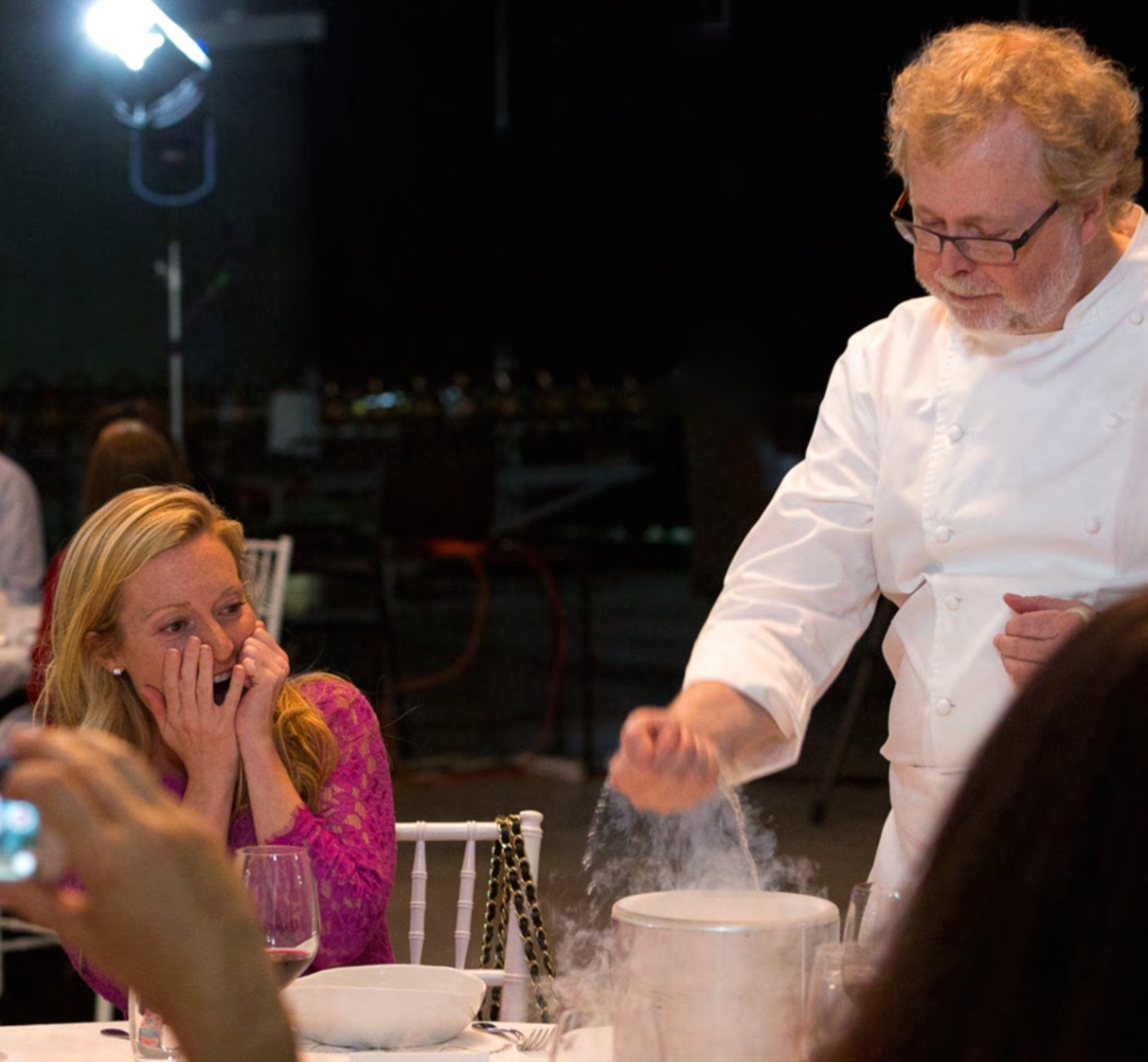
Myhrvold demonstrating liquid nitrogen at a Modernist Cuisine science dinner

While working as chief technology officer at Microsoft, Myhrvold took a leave to earn a culinary diploma from École de Cuisine La Varenne in France. Myhrvold's early culinary training was as an observer and unpaid apprentice at Rover's, one of Seattle's leading restaurants, with Chef Thierry Rautureau. Myhrvold is the principal author of a culinary text entitled Modernist Cuisine: The Art and Science of Cooking, released in March 2011, on the application of scientific research principles and new techniques and technology to cooking. That book, which earned a James Beard Foundation Award for "cookbook of the year" in 2012, was followed by the books Modernist Cuisine at Home, The Photography of Modernist Cuisine, Modernist Bread, and Modernist Pizza, all self-published by Myhrvold and with him as lead author. Myhrvold was part of a team that won first place at the world barbecue championships in Memphis. He has appeared as a guest judge on Top Chef.

=== Advocacy ===
In interviews with CNN, SuperFreakonomics author Stephen Dubner, and Scientific American, Myhrvold has discussed ways to reverse some of the effects of global warming/climate change by using geoengineering. Myhrvold and other inventors working with Intellectual Ventures have proposed several approaches, including one that would use hoses, suspended from helium balloons 25 kilometers (16 mi) above the Earth at high latitudes, to emit sulfur dioxide, which is known to scatter light.

=== Affiliations and awards ===
Myhrvold received the James Beard Foundation Award for cookbook of the year in 2012 and an honorary degree from The Culinary Institute of America in 2013 for his book Modernist Cuisine: The Art and Science of Cooking. His book Modernist Bread received a James Beard Foundation book award in 2018. In 2010, Myhrvold was named by Foreign Policy magazine to its list of top 100 global thinkers. He was selected as the keynote speaker for the UCLA College commencement ceremonies on Friday, June 12, 2015 and received the Earth, Planetary and Space Sciences Luminary Award from the UCLA Division of Physical Sciences in 2021. In 2013, Myhrvold was a judge for the inaugural Queen Elizabeth Prize for Engineering. Princeton University awarded him the James Madison Medal in 2005. He received the Golden Plate Award of the American Academy of Achievement in 1996.

Myhrvold endorsed Democratic candidate Hillary Clinton in the 2016 U.S. presidential election.

== Personal life ==
Myhrvold is married to Rosemarie Havranek, whom he met while studying at Princeton. They have twin sons, Conor and Cameron A. Myhrvold. Cameron heads a lab researching CRISPR-based technologies for studying RNA as an assistant professor of molecular biology at Princeton University. Nathan Myhrvold has a younger brother, Cameron.

Myhrvold prefers to use a Dvorak keyboard.

=== Relationship with Jeffrey Epstein ===
Myhrvold was an acquaintance of the convicted sex offender Jeffrey Epstein and attended dinner at his house. According to an anonymous source, Myhrvold was one of the people who introduced Epstein to Bill Gates. According to Vanity Fair writer Gabriel Sherman, Epstein allegedly visited Myhrvold's investment company Intellectual Ventures and brought young girls with him. Myhrvold denied being involved in Epstein's criminal activities or ever having known about them. His spokesperson stated, "Back in the day Epstein was a regular at TED conferences and he was a large donor to basic scientific research, so while Nathan knew him and has socialized with him, that's exactly where their association ends." Details corroborate earlier claims that Epstein had met with Myhrvold at his company, with an e-mail exchange detailing visitation and the appearance of a woman/girl by request of Myhrvold.

On July 24, 2025, the Wall Street Journal reported that a letter from Myhrvold containing wildlife photos from a recent trip to Africa was included in a leather-bound birthday book given to Epstein in 2003, three years before criminal charges were first filed against Epstein. The photographs included "a monkey screaming, lions and zebras mating, and a zebra with its penis visible." The letter commented that the photos "seemed more appropriate than anything I could put in words."
