= Milan Bhayana =

American chef and internet personality

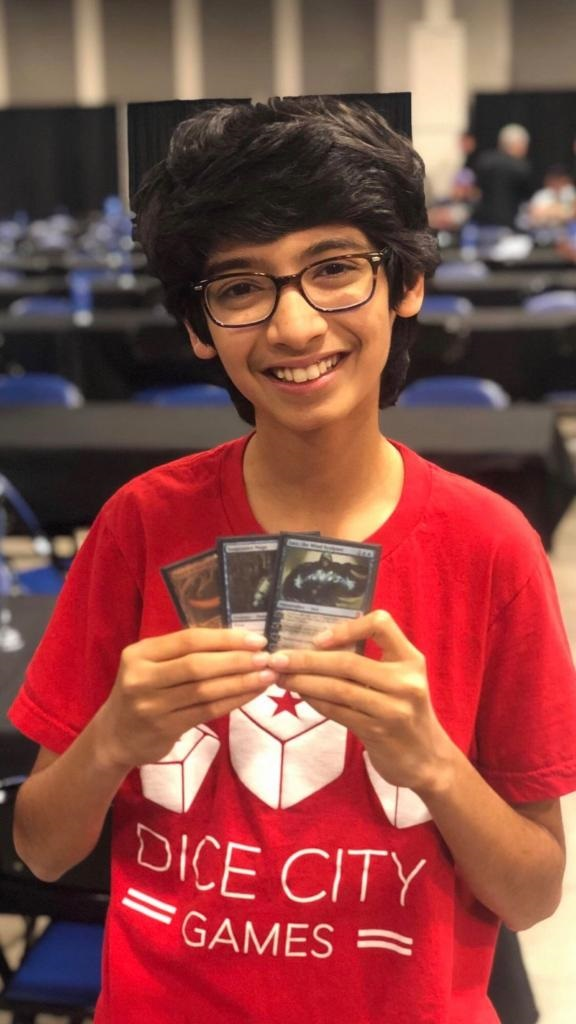
- Milan Bhayana with Magic card
- Born: September 27, 2006 (age 19)
- Known for: Internet personality

Milan Bhayana (born September 27, 2005) is an American chef, internet personality and Magic: The Gathering Player. He was a competitor on Top Chef Family Style. As of May 2023, he has over 1 million followers across his social media accounts.

Bhayana is the youngest player to qualify for the Magic Online Championship, and one of the youngest to qualify for the Pro Tour.

== Early life and education ==
Bhayana was born in Washington, DC. He is of Indian descent. He attends Bethesda Chevy Chase High School.

== Career ==
=== TikTok ===
Bhayana began posting cooking videos on TikTok on Thanksgiving Day, 2020, narrated by his sister, Malaika. By November 2021, he had accumulated 700,000 followers on the app. He learned how to cook from watching YouTube videos.

=== Top Chef ===
In 2021, Bhayana was announced as a competitor on Top Chef Family Style. He competed alongside his mother, Chandrani Ghosh. Bhayana won the quickfire challenge in episode two, “Truffles, Caviar, and Prawns -- Oh My!”. He was eliminated in episode six by celebrity judge Jojo Siwa.

=== Professional Magic the Gathering ===
Milan Bhayana qualified for Pro Tour Barcelona at 13, as the youngest player in the event. He has had widespread success on Magic Online, ranking #3 on the leaderboard in Season One of 2021, #2 in Season Two, and #1 overall in 2021.
