= Peter Rinearson =

American journalist, author, entrepreneur and executive

- Born: April 8, 1954 (age 72); Seattle, Washington, U.S.
- Occupations: Journalist; author; entrepreneur; executive
- Notable credit(s): "Making It Fly," "Babynamer.com," The Road Ahead

Peter Mark Rinearson (born April 8, 1954, Seattle) is an American journalist, author, entrepreneur and executive. He is a winner of the Pulitzer Prize and a former vice president of Microsoft. Much of his career has focused on enhancing tools for storytelling, from Microsoft Word to web publishing to social media.

== Journalism career ==
Rinearson attended the University of Washington, from which he graduated with a bachelor's degree in communications. During college Rinearson was managing editor of the University of Washington Daily, editor of the Sammamish Valley News (the now-defunct weekly newspaper in Redmond, Washington), and winner of the National Championship of the William Randolph Hearst Journalism Awards program.

Rinearson spent his 20s writing for the Seattle Times, for which he covered politics, Boeing, and Asia. In 1984, Rinearson won the Pulitzer Prize for Feature Writing for a series he wrote on Boeing's development of the 757. Two years after winning the Pulitzer, he left the Times to write books.

The Pulitzer Prize Board announced a new category of "Explanatory Reporting" in November 1984, citing Rinearson's series of explanatory articles that seven months earlier had won the Pulitzer Prize for Feature Writing. The series, "Making It Fly," was a 29,000-word account of the development of the Boeing 757 jetliner. It had been entered in the National Reporting category, but judges moved it to Feature Writing to award it a prize. In the aftermath, the Pulitzer Prize Board said it was creating the new category in part because of the ambiguity about where explanatory accounts such as "Making It Fly" should be recognized.

Rinearson was subsequently a national semifinalist for NASA's Journalist in Space project, cancelled in the wake of the Space Shuttle Challenger tragedy.

From 1995 to 1999, Rinearson assisted Bill Gates in writing a newspaper column carried by the New York Times Syndicate.

== Awards and honors ==
In addition to winning the Pulitzer Prize, Rinearson's "Making It Fly" won the ASNE Distinguished Writing Award for business writing, from the American Society of News Editors. Excerpts have been included in several books on journalism, including America's Best Newspaper Writing.

Rinearson was also the recipient of the Lowell Thomas Prize from the American Society of Travel Writers for his consumer affairs journalism regarding air travel (he won first place in the "non-trip reporting" category), the John Hancock Award for Excellence in Business and Financial Journalism, for his coverage of Japan, and the Special Paul Myher Award in the Penney-Missouri Journalism Awards from the University of Missouri School of Journalism (now known as the Missouri Lifestyle Journalism Awards).

He has served as a member of the national advisory board of the Poynter Institute, which provides continuing education for working journalists.

Rinearson is inventor on eight issued U.S. patents, granted between 2006 and 2017.

== Books authored ==
Rinearson co-wrote The Road Ahead with Bill Gates and Nathan Myhrvold. It was Gates' first book and spent seven weeks at the top of The New York Times best-seller list.

Previously in the 1980s, Rinearson wrote how-to books on using Microsoft Word in MS-DOS, for Microsoft Press. Of one of these, New York Times reviewer Erik Sandberg-Diment wrote: "Word owners should not be without Rinearson's book, even if they read no more than a tenth of it." According to Rinearson's official bio at his company, he "created the first software disk to accompany a Microsoft Press book, which presented a system of styles and style sheets that Microsoft later commissioned him to revise for Word for Windows. This work laid the foundation for the formatting styles built into Word today."

In recent years, Rinearson has been researching and writing an ambitious "history of the Seattle area, focusing on its entrepreneurialism."

== Entrepreneur ==
In 1988, Rinearson founded Alki Software, which created third-party products for Microsoft Word. Alki licensed to Microsoft the toolbar and several other features of Microsoft Word version 5.1 for the Macintosh, and for more than a decade sold the Foreign Proofing Tool kits that allowed people to work with Word in multiple languages.

In 1995, Rinearson co-founded a nine-person digital design company, Raster Ranch, that focused on 3D modeling for television, games, and the Web.

Two years later, Rinearson spun off from Alki a subsidiary, Intype, which created Babynamer.com, which had 300,000 monthly visitors. But the primary initiative of Intype was to build and market a Web-publishing platform that would enable a web site to offer a blend of professional and community created content. (This was before the word "blog" existed.) Rinearson believed that the economic principle called network effects would catapult to dominance publishers who owned the primary places where people congregated online to create and consume their own content. Intype was an attempt to get the newspaper industry, where Rinearson had started his career, to embrace community content before Web startups gained a strong foothold. The Newspaper Association of America used Intype's technology, but when no newspapers followed suit Rinearson sold Intype to Oxygen Media in 1999.

== Executive ==
With the sale of his company, Rinearson became a senior vice-president at the Oxygen television network, where he led software development and program management teams in New York, San Francisco, and Seattle.

He moved from Oxygen to Microsoft, where as a corporate vice president he was on the five-person senior leadership team of the Information Worker business unit, which published Microsoft Office and other productivity software. His teams developed Office-based software solutions for industry partners, and incubated potential products (including the forerunner of desktop search). Rinearson supervised Microsoft's corporate intranet, libraries, archive, and Center for Information Work. He also had certain marketing responsibilities.

After Microsoft, Rinearson returned to his entrepreneurial roots, where he undertook projects that converged into Intersect.com, a service he founded that launched in December, 2010 and closed in 2013. Intersect was a social network with a strong privacy model that let photos and other stories be posted or discovered at specific times and places. So, for example, photos taken at a school event by various parents (who might be strangers to each other) could be found and shared by looking at the time and place of the event. Postings also could be viewed and discovered on intersecting timelines, called storylines. This was a year before Facebook introduced its timelines, and when Mark Zuckerberg announced Facebook's forthcoming feature in 2011, Rinearson downplayed its importance. “As best we can tell, Facebook offers you only one timeline, it doesn’t appear to let you borrow content from other people, it doesn’t have Intersect’s interesting and entertaining ways of exploring time and place, and it doesn’t let you discover lives and stories that intersect with yours,” he said. Intersect was a success technologically but, despite Rinearson's initial confidence, could not gain traction against Facebook.

Rinearson was a co-executive producer of Wakefield, a Robin Swicord movie (based on a short story by E.L. Doctorow) starring Bryan Cranston and Jennifer Garner. It was released on May 19, 2017.

In 2018 and 2019, Rinearson was a member of the advisory board of Athira Pharma, a Seattle company developing a potential therapy for chronic, progressive neurodegenerative diseases such as Alzheimer's and Parkinson's. The drug was in clinical trials in the United States and France.

Rinearson is married to Jill Chan Rinearson, whose father, former King County Superior Court Judge Warren Chan, was the first Chinese American to occupy a judicial post in the United States. The couple has two grown children.
