= Kemmerer Power Station =

Nuclear power station located near Kemmerer, WY

- Kemmerer Power Station under construction in November 2024
- Country: United States
- Location: Kemmerer, WY
- Coordinates: 41°42′21″N 110°33′38″W
- Status: Under construction
- Construction began: 10 June 2024
- Owners: US SFR Owner, LLC

Nuclear power station
- Reactor type: Unit 1: SFR
- Reactor supplier: TerraPower

Power generation
- Units under const.: 1 × 500 MW_{e} Natrium SFR

External links
- Commons: Related media on Commons

The Kemmerer Power Station is an American nuclear power plant being built near Kemmerer, Wyoming by TerraPower. It will house one 345 MW_{e} Natrium reactor along with a thermal energy storage system able to vary its power output between 100 MW_{e} and 500 MW_{e} for load following.

The power station is the first Natrium reactor to be constructed, and the first commercial sodium-cooled fast reactor in the United States since Fermi 1 was decommissioned in 1975. TerraPower submitted its construction permit application to the Nuclear Regulatory Commission (NRC) on 28 March 2024, and construction of non-nuclear facilities began on 10 June 2024. The NRC approved Kemmerer Power Station's Construction Permit Application on 4 March 2026, issuing the first construction permit for an advanced commercial nuclear power plant in over 40 years. Construction of the nuclear facilities began on 23 April 2026.

== History ==
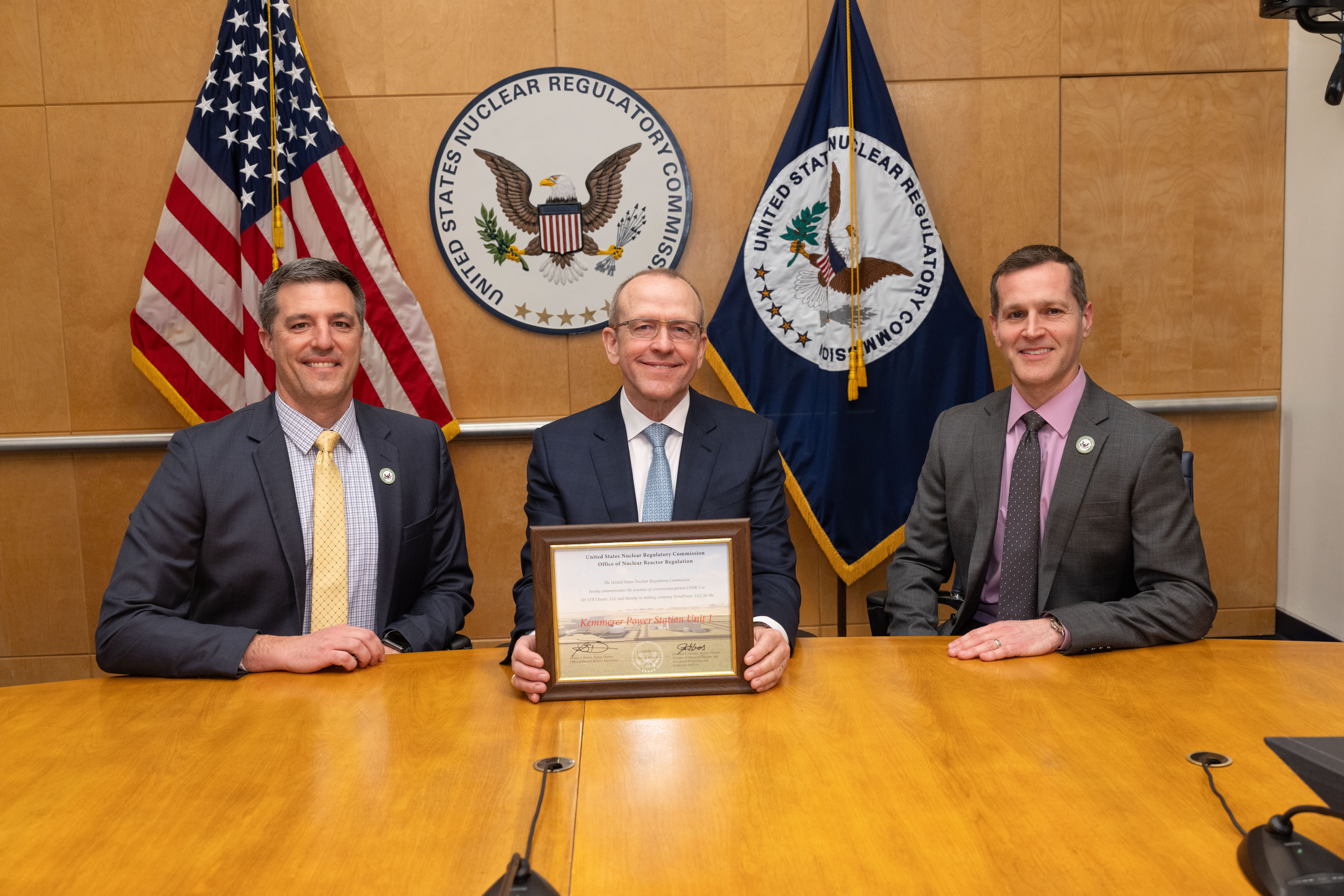
Signed Unit 1 construction permit at NRC headquarters, March 2026.

TerraPower, a Bellevue, Washington-based reactor developer, received funding in 2020 to construct a Natrium reactor as part of the Department of Energy's Advanced Reactor Demonstration Program. The company selected Kemmerer, Wyoming as the site of the new plant in 2021, and signed a memorandum of understanding with Centrus Energy in 2023 to supply high-assay low-enriched uranium fuel for the power station. TerraPower submitted their application for the site's construction permit to the NRC in March 2024. The company broke ground on the power plant in June 2024, beginning construction of the plant's Sodium Test and Fill Facility.

The company received the Wyoming state industrial siting permit for Kemmerer Power Station in January 2025. Kemmerer Training Center ground-breaking occurred in August 2025 to support training operators and maintenance technicians for site operation.

After receiving its draft Environmental Impact Statement (EIS) from the NRC in June 2025, the NRC issued its final approved EIS in October 2025. The NRC approved the facility's construction permit in March 2026, and nuclear construction began in April.

== Design ==
Kemmerer Power Station is divided into two distinct portions: the Nuclear Island and the Energy Island. The Nuclear Island contains the reactor, fuel handling, primary cooling systems, while the Energy Island contains the molten-salt energy storage tanks, power generation systems, and standby diesel generators. The two islands are designed to function independently, connected only via the energy storage system.

=== Nuclear Island ===
The power station utilizes a pool-type sodium-cooled fast reactor to generate heat. The initial fuel for the core is sodium-bonded uranium metal within a zirconium matrix clad in HT-9 steel. The core is loaded in a hexagonal matrix consisting of fuel assemblies, reflector assemblies, shield assemblies, 13 control rod assemblies, and various other test and neutron source assemblies as needed for operation and testing.

The reactor will produce a constant 840 MW of thermal power, while a molten-salt storage system similar to that of a concentrated solar power plant will vary its electric power. Fission heat is transferred to the molten sodium coolant, which is circulated by two variable speed primary sodium pumps (PSP) to two intermediate sodium heat exchangers (IHX). The reactor, sodium coolant, PSPs, and IHXs are contained inside the reactor vessel. To prevent the sodium reaction with air, an argon cover gas is maintained above the free surface of the sodium below the reactor vessel head. All penetrations into the reactor vessel are above the free surface of the primary sodium coolant. The reactor vessel is located inside a guard vessel with argon filling the annulus between the vessels and level instrumentation to detect sodium leakage from the reactor vessel. The maximum core outlet temperature at 100% power is 950 degrees Fahrenheit (510 degrees Celsius).

Two independent secondary sodium loops circulate a secondary liquid sodium through an IHX, a sodium-air heat exchanger (AHX) in the Intermediate Air Cooling System (IAC), a sodium-salt heat exchanger (SHX), and a variable speed intermediate sodium pump (ISP). Each loop is functionally identical and remains separate from the other for redundancy.

The IAC consists of an AHX, a chimney structure, air blowers, dampers, and an air heater. It has three modes of operation: Active Mode, Blower Mode, and Passive Mode. In Active Mode, the loop's ISP provides forced circulation of sodium coolant, and the blower provides forced airflow across the AHXs. In Blower Mode, the intermediate sodium circulates by natural convection with blowers operating. In Passive Mode, both the intermediate sodium and air circulate by natural convection.

The intermediate sodium loop acquires heat from the primary coolant in the IHX. During normal shutdown and low power operations, heat is rejected to the environment by the IAC in Active Mode. As power rises, heat is transferred to the molten salt by the sodium-salt heat exchanger and heat rejection to the environment is reduced. Once heat is being removed from the intermediate sodium loop by only the sodium-salt heat exchanger, the plant is considered to be in High Power Operation.

=== Energy Island ===
Heat transferred from the SHX in the intermediate sodium loop is received by the Nuclear Island Salt System (NSS). This salt is circulated to the Hot Salt Tank at the Energy Island. From there, the salt is circulated through Steam Generation to the Cold Salt Tank and then returned to the NSS to again be heated in the SHX. The rate of transfer from the Hot Salt Tank through Steam Generation to the Cold Salt Tank does not need to match the rate of transfer from the Cold Salt Tank through the Nuclear Island to the Hot Salt Tank. This difference in flow rates enables the design to adjust electrical power while maintaining a constant reactor power.

Steam generated from the molten salt is provided to the main turbine generator, condensed from the turbine exhaust, and returned as feedwater to Steam Generation. Heat received by the circulating water in the condenser is rejected to the environment via cooling towers.

Viva Naughton Reservoir provides the primary water supply. The reservoir is fed by the Hams Fork River. There is water at the reservoir for circa 54 days under a 100-year low water level, with no inflow. The Kemmerer Unit 1 Site is in North Fork Little Muddy Creek watershed.

=== Safety systems ===
Decay heat generated while the reactor is shutdown is circulated by the PSPs at minimum speed or via natural circulation if the PSPs are unavailable. Heat is removed from the reactor vessel by the IAC. During normal conditions, the IAC operates in Active Mode. During off-normal conditions, IAC Blower Mode will remove decay heat. IAC Passive Mode is used for Emergency operation. Both trains of IAC are required to remove decay heat in Passive Mode. When IAC is not available for decay heat removal, the Reactor Air Cooling (RAC) system provides decay heat removal through natural convection with air. RAC is the system designated as the safety-related decay heat removal method. RAC remains in service continuously, and no operator action or system configuration changes are required to initiate cooling. Natural circulation of the sodium coolant will heat the walls of the reactor vessel which will transfer heat to the RAC via radiative cooling.

In the event of loss of power to the site, two Standby Diesel Generators automatically start to provide power to select plant loads for investment protection. There is no safety-related electrical distribution system for the plant, as all safety-related functions are passive. While not required, IAC Active Mode is available with power from the Standby Diesel Generators.

== Vendors ==
On 3 October 2024, TerraPower announced the selection of Premier Technology, Inc. to design, test, fabricate, and deliver the IAC's AHX and Air Stack Structures & Equipment.

On 18 December 2024, TerraPower announced the vendors for key reactor components. Equipos Nucleares S.A., located in Spain, will construct the reactor head. Doosan Corporation, located in South Korea, will construct the core barrel, guard vessel and internal supports for the reactor. HD Hyundai, also in South Korea, will manufacture the reactor vessel. Marmen, a North American company, will construct the rotatable plug assembly.

== See also ==
- Generation IV reactor
- Nuclear power in the United States
