= TerraPower =

Nuclear reactor design company

TerraPower, LLC
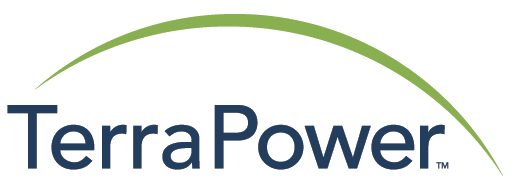
- Type: Private
- Industry: Nuclear power
- Founded: 2006
- Founder: Bill Gates
- Headquarters: Bellevue, Washington, United States
- Key people: Bill Gates (Chairman); Nathan Myhrvold (Vice Chairman); Chris Levesque (President & CEO)
- Products: Natrium Reactor; Molten Chloride Fast Reactor
- Website: www.terrapower.com

TerraPower, LLC is an American nuclear reactor design and development engineering company headquartered in Bellevue, Washington.

TerraPower is developing multiple designs of fast-neutron reactors, including a sodium-cooled fast reactor (SFR) and a molten-salt reactor. As of 2026, the company is constructing its Natrium SFR design in Kemmerer, Wyoming as the Kemmerer Power Station.

== History ==
In September 2015, TerraPower signed an agreement with state-owned China National Nuclear Corporation to build a prototype 600 MWe Travelling Wave Reactor unit at Xiapu in Fujian province, China, from 2018 to 2025. Commercial power plants, generating about 1150 MWe, were planned for the late 2020s. In January 2019 it was announced that the project had been abandoned due to technology transfer limitations placed by the Trump administration.

In October 2020, the company was chosen by the United States Department of Energy (DOE) as a recipient of a matching grant totaling between $400 million and $4 billion over the ensuing five to seven years to build a demonstration reactor using their Natrium design as part of the DOE's Advanced Reactor Demonstration Program. Bechtel was its design, licensing, procurement and construction partner.

In June 2021, TerraPower and PacifiCorp, a subsidiary of Warren Buffett's Berkshire Hathaway Energy, announced plans to build a joint Natrium reactor.

Four cities in Wyoming were considered for the demonstration reactor that were affected by the closure of fossil-fuel power plants: Gillette, Kemmerer, Glenrock and Rock Springs. PacificCorp does business in Wyoming as Rocky Mountain Power and has a coal power plant in each of the candidate locations. It was announced November 16, 2021 that Kemmerer had been selected.

In 2024, TerraPower selected Kemmerer as the site for a 345 MWe Natrium reactor. The company submitted their application for a nuclear construction permit for Kemmerer Unit 1 to the United States Nuclear Regulatory Commission (NRC) on March 28, 2024.

The power station is designed to consist of two adjacent parts: an "energy island" and a "nuclear island". In June 2024 the site broke ground, beginning construction of the facility's Sodium Test & Fill Facility. Cost estimates were $4 billion, with the DOE supplying half, and Bill Gates contributing $1 billion.

In April 2025, TerraPower notified the British Office for Nuclear Regulation that it intends to enter the Generic Design Assessment process for its Natrium reactor and the company announced in June 2026 that it had begun Step 1 of the assessment.

In October 2025 the Kemmerer project completed its final Environmental Impact Statement (EIS), finding no adverse impacts. The NRC issued the construction permit for Kemmerer Unit 1 on March 4, 2026. It was the first construction permit for a non-LWR issued by the NRC. Reactor construction began in April 2026.

In January 2026, Meta announced an agreement to fund two Natrium reactors to be built by 2032, and to give Meta the rights to electricity produced by up to six more Natrium reactors planned to enter operation by 2035.

In March 2026, TerraPower Isotopes announced plans to build a $450 million, 250,000-square-foot facility in Philadelphia for the production of actinium-225, a radioactive isotope used in radiation treatments for diseases such as leukemia and melanoma. The project will receive a $7 million grant through the Pennsylvania Strategic Investments to Enhance Sites program and a $3 million Pennsylvania First grant.

In September 2026, TerraPower and Bechtel announced they would end their development relationship on the Kemmerer Unit 1 Natrium contract, after they were unable to reach an agreement on the next stage of the development. Bechtel will complete the Sodium Test and Fill Facility and support a transition, and TerraPower will seek a new contractor for the engineering, procurement and construction contract.

== Funding and management ==
TerraPower is partly funded by the US Department of Energy/DOE and Los Alamos National Laboratory. One of TerraPower's primary investors is Gates, via the Cascade Investment. Others include Charles River Ventures and Khosla Ventures, which reportedly invested $35 million in 2010.

TerraPower is led by chief executive officer Chris Levesque. In December 2011 India's Reliance Industries bought a minority stake through one of its subsidiaries and its Chairman Mukesh Ambani joined the board. Other TerraPower participants include scientists and engineers from Lawrence Livermore National Laboratory, the Fast Flux Test Facility, Microsoft, and various universities, as well as managers from Siemens, Areva NP, the ITER project, Ango Systems Corporation and DOE.

SK Group agreed to invest $250 million in 2022. The round was co-led by SK Inc and SK Innovation and Gates. DOE gave TerraPower cost-share funding through the Advanced Reactor Demonstration Program (ARDP) to test, license and build an advanced reactor within seven years.

Company objectives include:

- Exploring significant improvements to nuclear power using 21st century technologies, state-of-the-art computational capabilities and expanded data.
- Evaluating the impact of new concepts on the fuel cycle, from mining to spent fuel disposal.
- Pursuing independent private funding.

== Designs ==
=== Traveling Wave Reactor ===
TerraPower chose traveling wave reactors (TWRs) as its primary technology. Their major benefit is high fuel utilization that does not require nuclear reprocessing and could eliminate the need to enrich uranium. TWRs are designed to convert typically non-fissile fertile nuclides (U-238) into fissile nuclides (Pu-239) in-situ and then shift power production from the "burned" region to the "bred" region. This allows the benefits of a closed fuel cycle without the expense and proliferation-risk of enrichment/reprocessing plants. Enough fuel for between 40 and 60 years of operation could be included in the reactor during manufacturing. The reactor could be installed below ground, where it could operate for an estimated 100 years. TerraPower described its reactor design as a Generation IV design.

TWR places a small core of the enriched fuel in the center of a much larger mass of non-fissile material, in this case depleted uranium. Neutrons from the fission in the core "breeds" new fissile material in the surrounding mass, producing plutonium-239. Over time, enough fuel is bred in the area surrounding the core that it can undergo fission, enabling a steady-state reactor composition to be approximated by moving outer fuel rods towards the core as original core fuel rods are moved to the periphery.

By using depleted uranium as fuel, the new reactor type could reduce depleted uranium stockpiles. TerraPower notes that the US harbors 700,000 metric tons of depleted uranium and that 320 metric tons could power 100 million homes for a year. Reports claim that TWR's high fuel efficiency, combined with the ability to use uranium recovered from river or sea water, means enough fuel is available to generate electricity for 10 billion people at US per capita consumption levels over million-year time-scales.

On November 6, 2009, TerraPower executives and Bill Gates visited Toshiba's Yokohama and Keihin Factories in Japan, and concluded a non-disclosure agreement with them on December 1. Toshiba had developed an ultracompact reactor, the 4S, that could operate for 30 years without fuel handling and generated 10 megawatts. Some of the 4S technologies are considered to be transferable to TWRs.

During the research and development process, the conceptual framework was simulated by supercomputers with empirical evidence for theoretical feasibility. In 2015, TerraPower signed a deal with China National Nuclear Corporation to build a TWR in China. However, following the Trump Administration's restriction of nuclear technology transfer with China, TerraPower cancelled the project in January 2019.

=== Molten Chloride Fast Reactor ===
In October 2015, the company was reported to be investigating a fast-spectrum molten salt reactor design with Southern Company as a technology alternative.

In February 2022, it was announced that the two companies had agreed to build a demonstration fast-spectrum salt reactor, the Molten Chloride Reactor Experiment, at Idaho National Laboratory (INL). The test reactor will be constructed at the LOTUS testbed at INL, and will use liquid NaCl-UCl_{3} salt as its coolant, permitting it to operate on a fast spectrum using the dissolved uranium chloride as fuel. It would be the first fast-spectrum molten-salt reactor ever constructed.

In 2023, the US Department of Energy announced that the test reactor would use highly-enriched uranium (HEU) fuel containing as much as 90% ^{235}U, contradicting the country's longer-term project to remove HEU from all reactors.

In December 2025, INL announced that it had fabricated the first batch of chloride salt fuel for MCRE.

=== Natrium ===
The Natrium reactor is a 345 MW_{e} sodium-cooled fast reactor coupled to a 1 GWh molten salt energy storage system. The energy storage system allows the power plant to temporarily boost its electrical output to 500 MW_{e}, enabling it to integrate with renewable resources. The power plant is designed to be capable of load following using its energy storage system. The reactor would produce a constant output of 345 MW_{e}, while the energy storage system would quickly throttle its output between 100 MW_{e} and 500 MW_{e} without needing to adjust reactivity. Sodium offers a 785-Kelvin temperature range between its solid and gaseous states, nearly 8x that of water's 100-Kelvin range. It can absorb large amounts of heat without requiring pressurization, and is not at risk of decomposition at high temperature as water is.

Natrium primarily uses austenitic stainless steels for components in contact with molten sodium, due to the nature of the components involved a protective oxide layer is formed on the steels in the presence of the sodium, inhibiting further corrosion. Corrosion monitoring systems utilizing Ultrasonic testing are in place to detect any potential issues. Regular maintenance and inspections help identify and address corrosion concerns before they become significant.

Natrium fuel is made from high-assay, low enriched uranium (HALEU), at 20 percent uranium-235. The fuel rods consist of metallic uranium slugs with stainless steel cladding. Whilst this metallic fuel has a melting point lower than the UO_{2}ceramic pellets used in the light water reactors, it has higher heat conduction keeping it cooler during use.

Natrium control rods descend using only gravity in case of equipment damage/failure, while the reactor can be cooled via natural circulation in the event of a power failure. Power output is a constant 345 MWe. The plant is designed to run at 100 percent output, 24/7. The storage system is designed to work in tandem with intermittent energy sources, responding to their variable output. It can produce 150% of the rated power output, or 500 MWe for 5.5 hours.

Natrium uses liquid sodium as a coolant, eliminating the cost of using a high-pressure primary loop. It then transfers that heat to molten salt, which can be stored in tanks and used to generate steam on demand, enabling the reactor to run continuously at constant power, while allowing dispatchable electricity generation.

== See also ==
- Next Generation Nuclear Plant
- Nuclear renaissance in the United States
- Small modular reactor
