= Savely Feinberg =

Soviet nuclear physicist (1910–1973)

- Савелий Фейнберг
- Born: 24 December 1910; Baku, Baku Governorate, Russian Empire
- Died: 20 October 1973 (aged 62); Moscow, Soviet Union
- Resting place: Novodevichy Cemetery, Moscow
- Citizenship: Soviet Union
- Education: Azerbaijan Polytechnic Institute
- Known for: VVER reactors, Traveling wave reactor
- Awards: Stalin Prize (1953); Lenin Prize (1960); Kurchatov Medal (1973); USSR State Prize (1974)
- Scientific career
- Fields: Nuclear physics
- Workplaces: Semenov Institute of Chemical Physics; Kurchatov Institute; Gromov Flight Research Institute; Moscow Engineering Physics Institute

Savely Moiseevich Feinberg (Russian: Саве́лий Моисе́евич Фе́йнберг; 24 December 1910 – 20 October 1973) was a Soviet nuclear physicist who contributed to the design and development of VVER nuclear reactors.

== Biography ==
Feinberg was born on 24 December 1910, in Baku and attended the Azerbaijan Polytechnic Institute. He is a cousin of Evgenii Feinberg. In 1932 he graduated specializing in engineer-architect. He obtained his master's degree in 1934. Between the period from 1934 to 1942, he worked at the Azneftproekt Institute. In 1942, he worked on the construction of an aircraft factory in Baku. In 1942-1943 he taught at the Higher Naval School (Baku). In 1944, he was seriously injured during the bombing in the Great Patriotic War. In 1944-1945 he worked as a structural engineer – the head of the strength group at the Gromov Flight Research Institute. Since 1945, he worked at the Semenov Institute of Chemical Physics. From 1946 until his death he worked in Laboratory No. 2 of the USSR Academy of Science(now Kurchatov Institute) as senior research fellow, head of the theoretical sector, deputy head of department of the institute. From 1947, he taught as a professor at the Department of Theoretical and Experimental Physics of Nuclear Reactors of Moscow Engineering Physics Institute. He died in 1973 and was buried in the Necropolis of Novodevichy Convent.

== Contributions ==
The magistral ideas of Feinberg used in the developments of nuclear reactors can not be neglected. In 1958, he proposed the concept of Traveling wave reactor which is the nuclear reactor that could breed fuel within its core and he was the one who coined the term "breed-and-burn" reactor.

The Feinberg-Galanin method has been used for the calculation of the thermal utilization and thermal-flux fine structure of cluster-type fuel elements in liquid-moderated reactors such as light water reactors.

== Books ==
- CM. Feinberg, S.B. Shikhov. Theory of Nuclear Reactors, T.1, Elementary Theory of Reactors. – M .: Atomizdat, 1978.
