= Nuclear island =

The nuclear island (or reactor island) of a nuclear power station is the containment building and the equipment it encloses: the nuclear reactor with its reactor pressure vessel and the primary coolant circuit, comprising the coolant pumps, steam generators, connecting piping and auxiliary equipment. This set of components is also called the nuclear steam supply system. The structure is normally built of concrete lined with steel, and its purpose is to keep radioactive material inside the building if the reactor coolant system suffers a serious failure. The island is distinct from the conventional island, a separate building housing the turbine and generator, which the steam from the island drives to produce electricity; that building is usually the largest on the site and contains no radioactive material. The remainder of the station, made up of auxiliary and ancillary plants, is known as the balance of plant (BOP).

The essential parts of the nuclear island are the containment building which houses:

- Nuclear reactor containing the nuclear reactor core, control rods and nuclear fuel, the heart of the power station which generates heat for electricity generation.
- reactor pressure vessel
- nuclear reactor safety system
- steam raising systems with condensate feed pumps and steam raising boilers
- Emergency core cooling systems

The containment building sits on the nuclear island basemat. In base-isolated designs, the basemat itself rests on seismic isolators, decoupling the island from ground motion.

The reactor building occupies the center of the island. It is placed there both because it lies at the heart of the system, with which the other buildings interact, and because those buildings serve to protect it in the event of an external impact. Built as a concrete cylinder capped with a hemispherical dome and resting on a massive raft foundation, the building encloses all of the plant's primary circuit, core and pressure vessel included, and acts as the last of the plant's three barriers to the release of radioactivity. A neighboring fuel building holds a pool for fuel assemblies, storing new fuel awaiting loading and spent fuel after discharge; a tunnel connects the two buildings for the transfer of the assemblies. Cooling water for the plant is drawn from a river or sea by a pumping station in a separate building outside the island.
