= Intellectual Ventures =

American private equity company

Intellectual Ventures Management, LLC
- Type: Privately held company
- Industry: Patent monetization
- Founded: 2000
- Founder: Nathan Myhrvold; Edward Jung; Peter Detkin; Gregory Gorder
- Headquarters: Bellevue, Washington, United States
- Number of locations: 10
- Number of employees: 800
- ASN: 6216
- Website: www.intellectualventures.com

Intellectual Ventures is an American private equity company that centers on the development and licensing of intellectual property. Intellectual Ventures is one of the top-five owners of U.S. patents, as of 2011. Its business model focuses on buying patents and aggregating those patents into a large patent portfolio and licensing these patents to third parties or seeking legal damages against third parties it claims are infringing the patents. The company has been described as the country's largest and most notorious patent trolling company, the ultimate patent troll, and the most hated company in tech.

In 2009, the firm launched a prototyping and research laboratory, Intellectual Ventures Lab, which attracted media controversy when the book SuperFreakonomics described its ideas for reducing global climate change. The firm formerly claimed to also collaborate on humanitarian projects through its Global Good program.

== Overview ==
In 2000, Intellectual Ventures was founded as a private partnership by Nathan Myhrvold and Edward Jung of Microsoft, later joined by co-founders Peter Detkin of Intel and Gregory Gorder of Perkins Coie. The Intellectual Ventures Management Company is owned 40% Nathan Myhrvold, 20% Peter Detkin, 20% Gregory Gorder and 20% Edward Jung. They reportedly have raised over $5.5 billion from many large companies including Microsoft, Intel, Sony, Nokia, Apple, Google, Yahoo, American Express, Adobe, SAP, Nvidia, and eBay, plus investment firms such as Stanford, Hewlett Foundation, Mayo Clinic, and Charles River Ventures. In December 2013, the firm released a list of approximately 33,000 of the nearly 40,000 assets in their monetization program. Licenses to patents are obtained through investment and royalties. In March 2009, the firm announced expansion into China, India, Japan, Korea and Singapore to build partnerships with scientists and institutions in Asia.

== Investment funds ==
The company operates two primary investment funds:

- Invention Investment Fund (IIF), purchasing existing inventions and licensing them
- Investment Science Fund (ISF), focused on internally developed inventions

The company also formerly operated a third fund, Invention Development Fund (IDF), which later spun out as a separate company, Xinova, in 2016 and eventually wound down in 2021.

== Intellectual Ventures Lab ==
In 2009, Intellectual Ventures launched a prototyping and research laboratory, Intellectual Ventures Lab, hiring scientists to imagine inventions which could exist but do not yet exist, and then filing descriptions of these inventions with the US Patent Office. Notable participants include Robert Langer of MIT, Leroy Hood of the Institute for Systems Biology, Ed Harlow of Harvard Medical School, Bran Ferren and Danny Hillis of Applied Minds, and Sir John Pendry of Imperial College. The Sunday Times reported that the company applies for about 450 patents per year, in areas from vaccine research to optical computing and, as of May 2010, 91 of the applications had been approved. Internally developed inventions include a safer nuclear reactor design (which won the MIT Technology Review Top 10 Emerging Technologies in 2009) that can use uranium waste as fuel or thorium which is plentiful and poses no proliferation risk, a mosquito-targeting laser, and a series of computer models of infectious disease.

Their efforts to promote a method to reverse or reduce the effects of global climate change by artificially recreating the conditions from the aftermath of a volcanic eruption gained media coverage following the release of the book SuperFreakonomics, whose chapter about global warming proposes that the global climate can be regulated by geo-engineering of a stratoshield based upon patented technology from the company. The chapter has been criticized by some economists and climate science experts who say it contains numerous misleading statements and discredited arguments, including this presentation of geoengineering as a replacement for CO_{2} emissions reduction. Among the critics are Paul Krugman, Brad DeLong, The Guardian, and The Economist. Elizabeth Kolbert, a science writer for The New Yorker who has written extensively on global warming, contends that "just about everything they [Levitt and Dubner] have to say on the topic is, factually speaking, wrong." In response, Levitt and Dubner have stated on their Freakonomics blog that global warming is man-made and an important issue. They warn against claims of an inevitable doomsday; instead they look to raise awareness of less traditional or popular methods to tackle the potential problem of global warming.

Lowell Wood, an "inventor in residence" at Intellectual Ventures, became the most-patented inventor in US history in 2015, breaking the record held by Thomas Edison for over 80 years.

== Global Good ==
Global Good was a not-for-profit collaboration between the firm and the Gates family, to develop solutions for pressing problems in the developing world. Its technologies included:

- Arktek, a passive vaccine storage device that allows vaccines to be transported to parts of the world that lack reliable refrigeration. It uses a small amount of ice for cooling and requires no external power supply, relying on extraordinary insulation. The device has been used to transport vaccines around the world, and Myhrvold believes the device may be useful for transporting organs. The firm produced a modified version of the Arktek to transport newly developed Ebola vaccines to Sierra Leone and Guinea during the 2014 Ebola outbreak at the required much colder temperature.
- The Photonic Fence, a device to identify and kill mosquitos with lasers to prevent malaria, suggested by Lowell Wood, a company researcher. The device uses a non-lethal laser to track insects and monitor their wing-beat frequency. If it detects a female mosquito, the device fires a kill laser. It has an effective range of 100 feet and can purportedly kill up to 100 mosquitoes per second. The device has not yet been mass-produced.
- The Autoscope, which uses artificial intelligence to diagnose malaria. The device has been field-tested in Thailand and reportedly outperformed the average human diagnostician. It too is not yet scheduled for mass-production.
- Mazzi, a milk jug designed for farmers in the developing world. The firm partnered with Heifer International to design the jug, which is cheap, sturdy, and easy to clean. It features a funnel that results in decreased spillage.

In mid-2020, Global Good was dismantled, with some of its components (most notably the Institute for Disease Modeling) transitioning into the Gates Foundation, and some evolving into new entities under Gates Ventures.

== Companies created ==
Intellectual Ventures has spun out a number of independent companies to commercialize inventions from its Invention Science Fund. Examples include Kymeta, a satellite technology company, TerraPower, which develops advanced nuclear reactors, Evolv, which applies metamaterials to security imaging, and Echodyne, a metamaterials-based radar company.

== Controversy ==
Publicly, Intellectual Ventures states that a major goal is to assist small inventors against corporations. In practice, the vast majority of IV's revenue comes from buying patents, aggregating these patents into a single portfolio spanning many disparate technologies and tying these patents together for license to other companies under the threat of litigation, or filing lawsuits for infringement of patents, a controversial practice referred to as "patent trolling."

Intellectual Ventures' purchased patents have largely been kept secret, though press releases with Telcordia and Transmeta indicated some or all of their patent portfolios were sold to the company. It reports that its purchasing activity as of spring 2010 has sent $350 million to individual inventors, and $848 million to small and medium size enterprises as well as returning "approximately $1 billion" to investors before filing any lawsuits, but IV's assistance to individual inventors has been contested. Investigative journalism suggests that the company makes most of its income from lawsuits and licensing of already-existing inventions, rather than from its own innovation. Intellectual Ventures has been described as a "patent troll" by Shane Robison, CTO of Hewlett-Packard and others, allegedly accumulating patents not in order to develop products around them but with the goal to pressure large companies into paying licensing fees. Recent reports indicate that Verizon and Cisco made payments of $200 million to $400 million for investment and licenses to the Intellectual Ventures portfolio. On December 8, 2010, in its 10th year of operations, Intellectual Ventures filed its first lawsuit, accusing Check Point, McAfee, Symantec, Trend Micro, Elpida, Hynix, Altera, Lattice and Microsemi of patent infringement. In September 2016, the Court of Appeals for the Federal Circuit ruled that all the relevant patent claims in the lawsuit were invalid, because "the patent merely applies a well-known idea using generic computers".

The company has been accused of hiding behind shell companies for earlier lawsuits, an accusation consistent with the findings of NPR's Planet Money in July 2011. The episode, which also aired as the This American Life episode "When Patents Attack", was dedicated to software patents, prominently featuring Intellectual Ventures. It includes sources accusing Intellectual Ventures of pursuing a strategy encouraging mutually assured destruction, including Chris Sacca calling Myhrvold's argument that Intellectual Ventures is offering protection from lawsuits in a "mafia-style shakedown".

Intellectual Ventures staff are active in lobbying and testifying in court on United States patent policy.
