= Kymeta =

American satellite communications company

Kymeta Corporation
- Type: Private company
- Industry: Satellite communications
- Founded: August 12, 2012
- Founder: Nathan Kundtz
- Headquarters: Redmond, Washington U.S,
- Key people: Nicole Piasecki (Chair of the Board); Manny Mora (President and CEO)
- Products: Kymeta Hawk u8; Kymeta Goshawk u8; Kymeta Osprey u8; Kymeta Peregrine u8; Kymeta Connectivity; Kymeta Access
- Number of employees: 275 (2022)
- Website: www.kymetacorp.com

Kymeta Corporation is a satellite communications company based in the United States.

== History ==
Kymeta was founded in August 2012 after spinning out from Intellectual Ventures and manufactures software-enabled, meta-materials based electronic beamforming antennas and terminals for satellite communications. Founder Nathan Kundtz served as the CEO until 2018.

In March 2017, Kymeta announced commercial availability of its first products, the mTenna^{U7} antenna subsystem module (ASM) and KyWay terminal, which are the first metamaterials-based products to be successfully commercialized. Kymeta partnered with Intelsat to offer KĀLO satellite services, which can be bundled with all Kymeta products. As of October 2018, the company has raised nearly $200 million in funding from various investors including Bill Gates and Lux Capital.

== Technology ==
Metamaterial Surface Antenna Technology (MSAT) is an innovative approach in satellite communications, developed by Kymeta Corporation. MSAT aims to overcome challenges in broadband satellite communications, especially in scenarios involving mobile platforms and non-geostationary satellites.

An important innovation in MSAT is the incorporation of high-birefringence liquid crystals (LC) as a tunable dielectric at microwave frequencies. This enables large-angle beam scanning of over 60 degrees while consuming minimal power, less than 10 Watts. Significantly, this scanning capability is achieved without mechanical components. The antenna's slim profile, with a thickness of about 5.0 cm, further contributes to its efficiency.

In terms of antenna design, MSAT introduces an innovative perspective by using metasurfaces and holographic beamforming principles. Unlike traditional three-dimensional metamaterials, which rely on bulky structures and resonant phenomena, MSAT employs metasurfaces characterized by small periodic scatterers and surface thickness relative to the wavelength of interest. This approach enhances efficiency and minimizes losses.

Metamaterial Surface Antenna Technology (MSAT) addresses challenges in satellite communications by incorporating high-birefringence liquid crystals, metasurfaces, and holographic beamforming. MSAT enables the development of electronically-scanned antennas that effectively address bandwidth, efficiency, and manufacturing tolerance issues. These antennas perform in both Ku and Ka satellite bands, making them a potential solution for various mobile satellite applications.
