= Nuclear island basemat =

Reinforced concrete foundation that supports nuclear island structures

The nuclear island basemat is a cast-in-place reinforced concrete foundation, about 6-foot-thick which serves to support the nuclear island structures.

Nuclear island structures consist of the reactor containment building (RCB), the shield building and auxiliary building (turbine building, control building and other).

For ease of construction the basemat is built on a mudmat, which is made of lean concrete that rests upon the load-bearing soil.

The nuclear island basemat's most important role is compliance with earthquake response, requiring that nuclear plants, to be designed so that, if an earthquake occurs strong enough to trigger a safe-shutdown, the nuclear island structures should continue to function within the applicable stress limits. The required functions of the nuclear island structures must be assured during and after the earthquake vibratory ground motion.
