= Traveling wave reactor =

Type of nuclear fission reactor

Numeric simulation of a TWR. Red: uranium-238, light green: plutonium-239, black: fission products. Intensity of blue color between the tiles indicates neutron density

A traveling-wave reactor (TWR) is a proposed type of nuclear fission reactor that can convert fertile material into usable fuel through nuclear transmutation, in tandem with the burnup of fissile material. TWRs differ from other kinds of fast-neutron and breeder reactors in their ability to use fuel efficiently without uranium enrichment or reprocessing, directly using depleted uranium, natural uranium, thorium, spent fuel removed from light water reactors, or some combination of these materials. The concept is still in the development stage and no TWRs have ever been built.

The name refers to the fact that fission remains confined to a boundary zone in the reactor core that slowly advances over time. TWRs could theoretically run self-sustained for decades without refueling or removing spent fuel.

== History ==
Traveling-wave reactors were first proposed in the 1950s and have been studied intermittently. The concept of a reactor that could breed its own fuel inside the reactor core was initially proposed and studied in 1958 by Savely Moiseevich Feinberg, who called it a "breed-and-burn" reactor. Further research was published by multiple teams from the late 1970s to the early 2000s.

The TWR was discussed at the Innovative Nuclear Energy Systems (INES) symposiums in 2004, 2006 and 2010 in Japan where it was called "CANDLE" Reactor, an abbreviation for Constant Axial shape of Neutron flux, nuclides densities and power shape During Life of Energy production. In 2010 information on the case of micro-hetero-structures was published. In 2012 it was shown that fission waves are a form of bi-stable reaction diffusion phenomenon. It has also been shown that fission waves can be stable, unstable or undergo a Hopf birfurcation depending on thermal feedback.

Irradiation damage has been shown to be an obstacle to the use of conventional materials in wave reactors, but it has been shown that fuel enrichment can be used to reduce this problem.

No TWR has yet been constructed, but in 2006 Intellectual Ventures launched a spin-off named TerraPower to model and commercialize a working design of such a reactor, which later came to be called a "traveling-wave reactor". TerraPower has developed TWR designs for low- to medium- (300 MWe) as well as high-power (~1000 MWe) generation facilities. Bill Gates featured TerraPower in his 2010 TED talk.

In September 2015 TerraPower and China National Nuclear Corporation (CNNC) signed a memorandum of understanding to jointly develop a TWR. TerraPower planned to build a 600 MWe demonstration Plant, the TWR-P, by 2018 to 2022 followed by larger commercial plants of 1150 MWe in the late 2020s. However, in January 2019 it was announced that the project had been abandoned due to technology transfer limitations placed by the Trump administration.

== Reactor physics ==
Papers and presentations on TerraPower's TWR describe a pool-type reactor cooled by liquid sodium. The reactor is fueled primarily by depleted uranium-238 "fertile fuel", but requires a small amount of enriched uranium-235 or other "fissile fuel" to initiate fission. Some of the fast-spectrum neutrons produced by fission are absorbed by neutron capture in adjacent fertile fuel (i.e. the non-fissile depleted uranium), which is "bred" into plutonium by the nuclear reaction:

^{238}_{92}U + ^{1}_{0}n → ^{239}_{92}U → ^{239}_{93}Np + β → ^{239}_{94}Pu + β

Initially, the core is loaded with fertile material, with a few rods of fissile fuel concentrated in the central region. After the reactor is started, four zones form within the core: the depleted zone, which contains mostly fission products and leftover fuel; the fission zone, where fission of bred fuel takes place; the breeding zone, where fissile material is created by neutron capture; and the fresh zone, which contains unreacted fertile material. The energy-generating fission zone steadily advances through the core, effectively consuming fertile material in front of it and leaving spent fuel behind. Meanwhile, the heat released by fission is absorbed by the molten sodium and subsequently transferred into a closed-cycle aqueous loop, where electric power is generated by steam turbines.

== Fuel ==
TWRs use only a small amount (~10%) of enriched uranium or another fissile fuel to initiate the nuclear reaction. The remainder of the fuel consists of natural or depleted uranium-238, which can generate power continuously for 40 years or more and remains sealed in the reactor vessel during that time. TWRs require substantially less fuel per kilowatt-hour of electricity than do light-water reactors (LWRs), owing to TWRs' higher fuel burnup, energy density and thermal efficiency. A TWR also accomplishes most of its reprocessing within the reactor core. Spent fuel can be recycled after simple "melt refining", without the chemical separation of plutonium that is required by other kinds of breeder reactors. These features greatly reduce fuel and waste volumes while enhancing proliferation resistance.

Depleted uranium is widely available as a feedstock. Stockpiles in the United States currently contain approximately 700,000 metric tons, which is a byproduct of the enrichment process. TerraPower has estimated that the Paducah enrichment facility stockpile alone represents an energy resource equivalent to $100 trillion worth of electricity. TerraPower has also estimated that wide deployment of TWRs could enable projected global stockpiles of depleted uranium to sustain 80% of the world's population at U.S. per capita energy usages for over a millennium.

In principle, TWRs are capable of burning spent fuel from LWRs, which is currently discarded as radioactive waste. Spent LWR fuel is mostly low enriched uranium (LEU) and, in a TWR fast-neutron spectrum, the neutron absorption cross-section of fission products is several orders of magnitude smaller than in a LWR thermal-neutron spectrum. While such an approach could actually bring about an overall reduction in nuclear waste stockpiles, additional technical development is required to realize this capability.

TWRs are also capable, in principle, of reusing their own fuel. In any given cycle of operation, only 20–35% of the fuel gets converted to an unusable form; the remaining metal constitutes usable fissile material. Recast and reclad into new driver pellets without chemical separations, this recycled fuel can be used to initiate fission in subsequent cycles of operation, thus displacing the need to enrich uranium altogether.

The TWR concept is not limited to burning uranium with plutonium-239 as the "initiator" in a ^{238}U–^{239}Pu cycle, but may also burn thorium with uranium-233 as the "initiator" in a ^{232}Th–^{233}U cycle.

== Traveling wave vs. standing wave ==
The breed-burn wave in TerraPower's TWR design does not move from one end of the reactor to the other but gradually from the center out. Moreover, as the fuel's composition changes through nuclear transmutation, fuel rods are continually reshuffled within the core to optimize the neutron flux and fuel usage over time. Thus, instead of letting the wave propagate through the fuel, the fuel itself is moved through a largely stationary burn wave. This is contrary to many media reports, which have popularized the concept as a candle-like reactor with a burn region that moves down the length of a fuel section. By replacing a static core configuration with an actively managed "standing wave" or "soliton", however, TerraPower's design avoids the problem of cooling a moving burn region. Under this scenario, the reconfiguration of fuel rods is accomplished remotely by robotic devices; the containment vessel remains closed during the procedure, with no associated downtime.
