= Modernist Bread =

2017 cookbook by Nathan Myhrvold and Francisco Migoya

- Author: Nathan Myhrvold, Francisco Migoya
- Language: English
- Publisher: The Cooking Lab
- Publication date: October 24, 2017
- Publication place: United States
- Media type: Print (hardcover)
- Pages: 2,500
- ISBN: 978-0982761052
- Preceded by: Modernist Cuisine
- Followed by: Modernist Pizza
- Website: modernistcuisine.com/books/modernist-bread/

Modernist Bread is a 2017 cookbook by Nathan Myhrvold and Francisco Migoya. The book is focused on bread, its history and baking techniques, and a guide to the science behind baking.

== Structure ==
Modernist Bread set consists of 5 volumes plus manual:

1. Volume 1: History and Fundamentals ("covers bread history, health, and the fundamentals of science for bakers: microbiology, heat and energy, and the physics of water")
2. Volume 2: Ingredients ("detailed look at the ingredients of bread—from the grains that become flour, to yeast and other ingredients that have Modernist applications")
3. Volume 3: Techniques and Equipment ("guidebook to the techniques of bread making. Chapters follow the process of making bread: fermentation, mixing, divide and shaping, proofing, scoring and finishing, ovens and baking, plus cooling and storage.")
4. Volume 4: Recipes I ("Each chapter is divided by types of breads. Volume 4 includes recipes for Lean breads, Enriched breads, and Rye and Whole Grain breads.")
5. Volume 5: Recipes II ("These chapters explore Flatbreads and Pizza, then move on to Bagels, Pretzels and Bao, Gluten-free breads, and Bread Machines.")
6. Recipe Manual ("430-page, wire-bound kitchen manual, plus reference tables")

== Reception ==
The book received positive reviews. Tejal Rao of The New York Times praised the book, saying that it:

chronicles the history and science of bread-making in depth ("Baking is applied microbiology," one chapter begins), breaking frequently for meticulous, textbook-style tangents on flour and fermentation. Its recipes require a commitment to close reading, and to flipping back through the books for deeper explanations. But each has useful variations that work with many kinds of mixing and cooking methods, for both professional and home kitchens. Above all, the book is a call for cooks to rethink one of the world's oldest foods — to understand how bread is made, using more than their instinct and intuition, so they can push the craft forward.

The reviewer was also impressed by a commitment the team made: "To reproduce the squat loaves, they procured a bronze Roman bread stamp (signum pistoris) from an antiquities dealer in New York (yes, he was horrified when he found out it would be put to use in a working oven) and called in a costume designer to dress a few of their bearded colleagues. What might sound like cute cosplay for bread nerds also sums up the spirit of Modernist Bread, a book that demands bakers look into the past without romanticizing it."

Joe Ray of Wired praised the book too, saying: "There are stunning photos, images of gluten made with scanning electron microscopes, history, discoveries, science, and at this point you're either amazed by the whole idea or went glassy-eyed in that last paragraph, vaguely wondering "Five books about bread?" before finding a suitable spot on the floor to take a nap." and "There's no way to look at Modernist Bread and not be stunned. It's gorgeous, and Myhrvold goes around talking about how many pounds of ink it took to print each five-volume set. Also, the team has both come up with new techniques and refined scores of old ones."

The Cooking World notes breadth of the book: "Another work that finds inspiration in a variety of sources, industrial as well as artisanal, offering a defense of high-fructose corn syrup alongside a guide to caring for wild sourdough starters, and debunking the idea that water purity affects the rise and flavor of the bread."

== Awards ==
The book is a winner of several awards:

- James Beard Cookbook Awards, Restaurant and Professional category (2018)
- International Association of Culinary Professionals Awards, Jane Grigson Award for Distinguished Scholarship and Depth of Research in Cookbooks (2018)
- Gourmand World Cookbook Awards, Best Food Book of the Year and Best Cookbook Publisher categories (2018)
- PubWest Design Awards, Reference Book (Gold) and Special Edition (Silver) categories (2018)
- Book Excellence Awards, Cookbook category (2018)
