= Modernist Pizza =

2021 cookbook by Nathan Myhrvold and Francisco Migoya

- Author: Nathan Myhrvold, Francisco Migoya
- Language: English
- Publisher: The Cooking Lab
- Publication date: October 19, 2021
- Publication place: United States
- Media type: Print (hardcover)
- Pages: 1708 pages
- ISBN: 978-1734386127
- Preceded by: Modernist Bread
- Website: modernistcuisine.com/books/modernist-pizza/

Modernist Pizza is a 2021 cookbook by Nathan Myhrvold and Francisco Migoya. The book is focused on pizza, its history and baking techniques, and a guide to the science behind it.

== Structure ==
Modernist Pizza consists of three volumes and a manual:

1. Volume 1: History and Fundamentals ("research into pizza’s history and place in the world at large, plus our guide to top pizza destinations. It also covers the science of pizza dough ingredients and pizza ovens.")
2. Volume 2: Techniques and Ingredients ("detailed information about pizza-making techniques and the fundamental components of pizza: dough, sauce, cheese, and toppings.")
3. Volume 3: Recipes ("foundational recipes for every pizza style in the book with both iconic pizzas and pizzas with innovative flavor themes. It wraps up with information on how to serve and store pizza.")
4. Kitchen Manual ("412-page wire-bound kitchen manual, plus reference tables")

== Reception ==
The book received positive reviews. The Cooking World called it "a fabulous multivolume set that captures Pizza's global history, culture, and styles and gives both professional and home pizza makers the tools to refine their skills and become an innovator of their craft."
