= Family of Bill Gates =

Bill Gates is a prominent American business magnate and philanthropist. He co-founded Microsoft, and he and his former wife Melinda French Gates co-founded the Gates Foundation.

== Notable family members ==
- Melinda French Gates (born 1964) is the former wife of Bill Gates, marrying him in 1994 and divorcing him in 2021.
- Phoebe Gates (born 2002) is the youngest child of Bill Gates and Melinda French. She co-founded the digital fashion platform Phia and is an advocate for women's health and reproductive rights.
- Bill Gates Sr. (1925–2020) was the father of Bill Gates. He was an attorney, philanthropist, and civic leader. He founded the law firm Shidler McBroom & Gates (a predecessor of K&L Gates), and also served as president of both the Seattle King County and Washington State Bar associations.
- Mary Maxwell (1929–1994) was the mother of Bill Gates. She was the president of United Way of King County.
- Mimi Gardner (born 1943) is the step-mother of Bill Gates. She is an art historian and former director of Seattle Art Museum.

== Other immediate family members ==
- Nayel Nassar (born 1991) is the son-in-law of Bill Gates. He is the equestrian who represented Egypt in the 2020 Summer Olympics in Tokyo. He married Gates' daughter Jennifer in October 2021.
