= Sophia Kianni =

American social entrepreneur

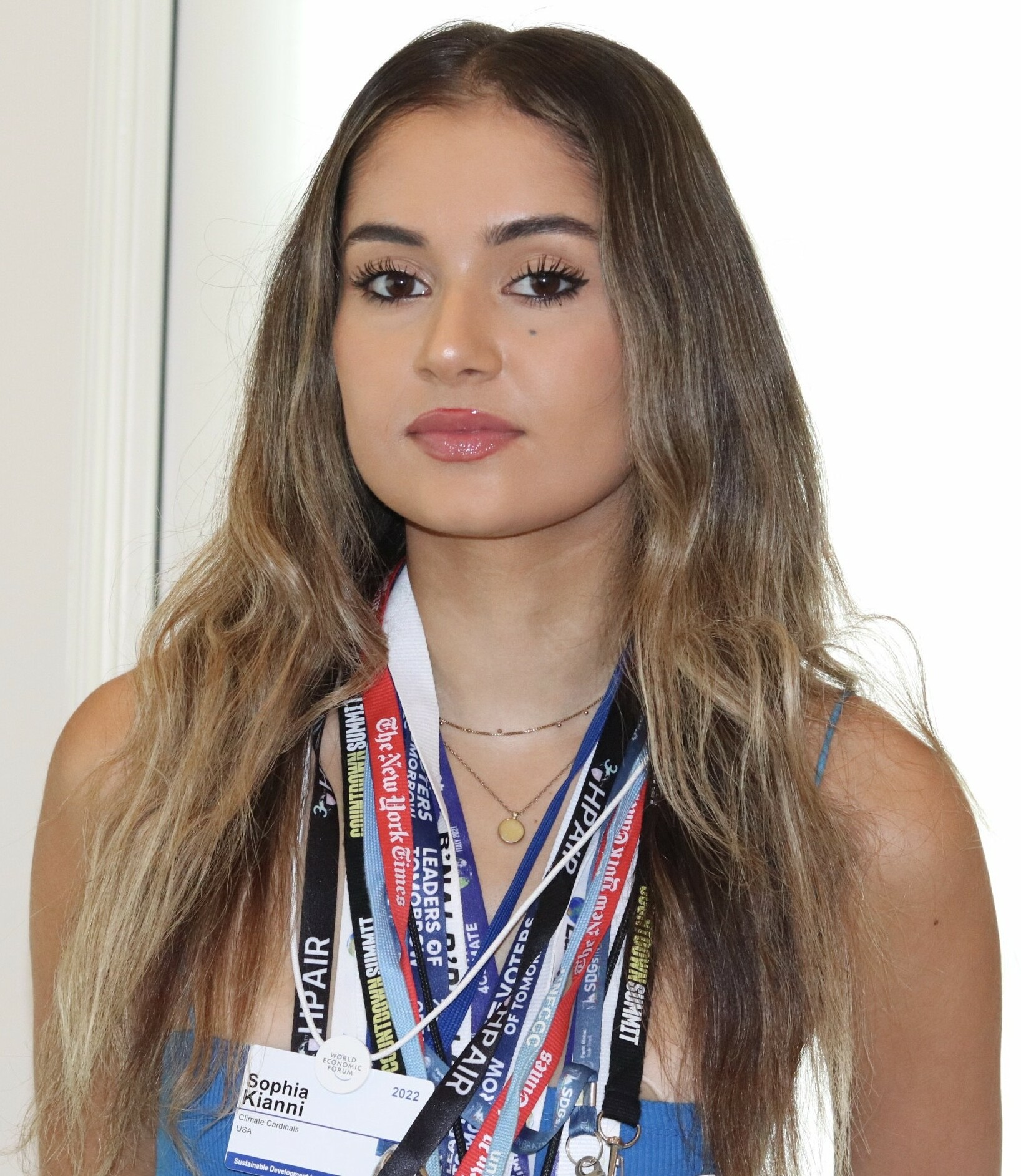
- Kianni in 2023
- Born: Sophia Kianni; December 13, 2001 (age 24)
- Education: Indiana University, Stanford University, Thomas Jefferson High School for Science and Technology
- Occupations: Social entrepreneur, climate activist, public speaker
- Organization(s): Phia, The Burnouts, Climate Cardinals
- Awards: Forbes 30 Under 30; Vice Human of the Year; Teen Vogue 21 under 21; BBC 100 Women
- Website: sophiakianni.com

Sophia Kianni is an Iranian American social entrepreneur. She is the founder of Phia, a shopping startup and a co-host of the podcast The Burnouts. She is the founder and president of Climate Cardinals, a youth-led climate nonprofit.

In July 2026, Bloomberg News reported that Kianni's start-up had been accused of charging commissions for clicks and sales it did not generate, prompting allegations of fraud involving Kianni and increased public scrutiny of the platform's business practices.

== Early life and education ==
Sophia Kianni was born on December 13, 2001. She is of Iranian descent.

She studied at Henry Wadsworth Longfellow Middle School, where her team won the statewide Science Olympiad, and at Thomas Jefferson High School for Science and Technology, where she was a National Merit Scholarship Program semifinalist.

In March 2020, Kianni was living with her mother, father, younger sister, and two pet lovebirds, in McLean, Virginia. During the COVID-19 pandemic, CNN, Time, and The Washington Post covered how she and her friends reacted to the social distancing measures.

After graduating from high school in 2020, Kianni first attended Indiana University. She transferred to Stanford University in 2021, where she majored in science, technology, & society. She graduated Stanford in 2025.

== Activism ==
=== Roles, protests, and initiatives ===
Kianni became interested in climate activism while in middle school when one night she saw that the stars over Tehran, capital of her parents' birthplace, were obscured by smog. Kianni described it as "a signal that our world is heating up at a terrifying pace." She later joined Fridays for Future, and took time off from school to support action on climate change. She also helped organize the 2019 Black Friday climate strike. In 2019, she became a national strategist for Fridays for Future and national partnerships coordinator for Zero Hour.

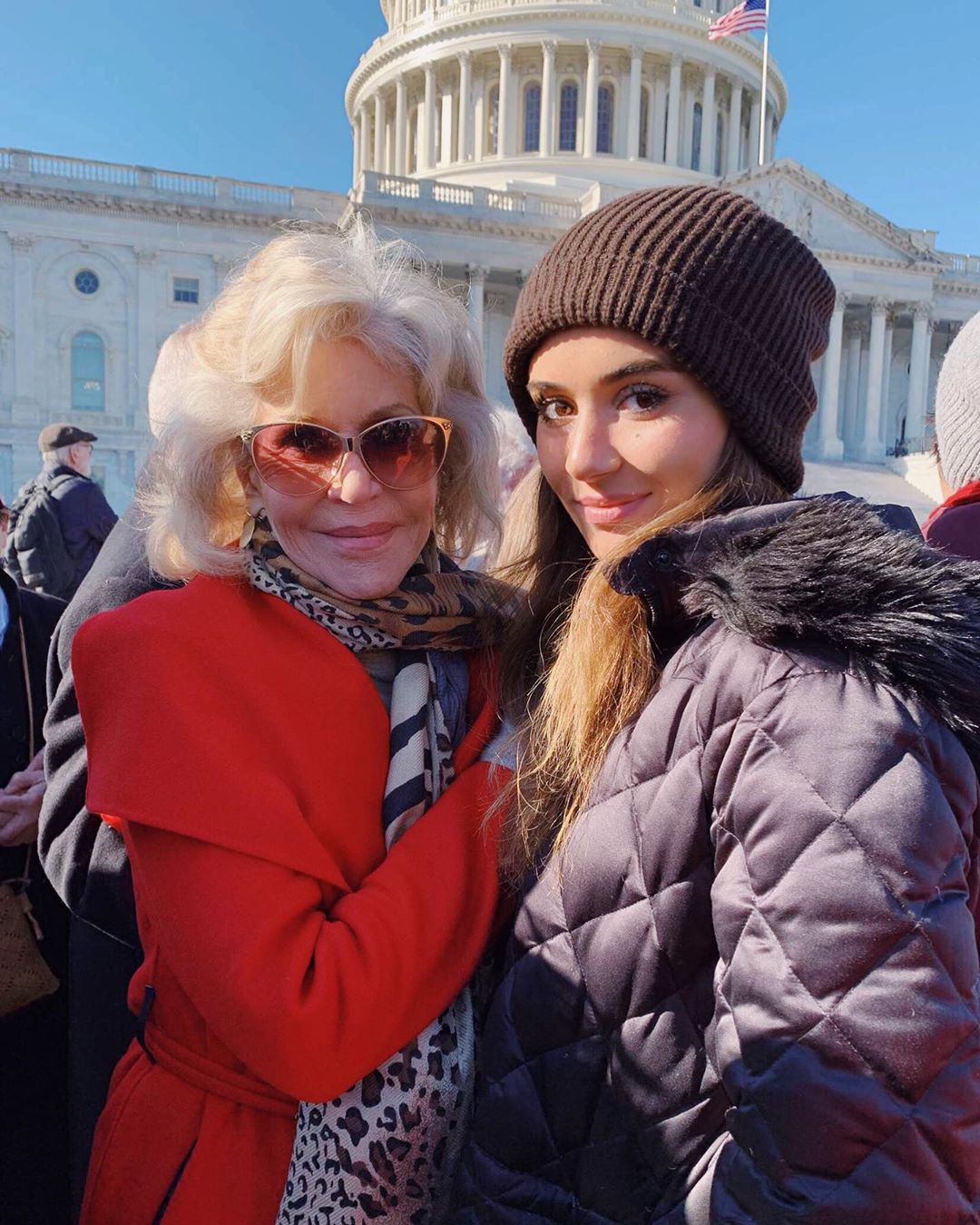
Jane Fonda (left) and Kianni (right) at Fire Drill Fridays DC event held in front of the Capitol, 2019

In November 2019, Kianni skipped school to join a group of protesters who intended to stage a week-long hunger strike and sit-in at the Washington, D.C., office of Speaker of the House Nancy Pelosi, demanding that she speak with them for an hour on camera about climate change. Locally, there were roughly a dozen participants; at 17 years old, Kianni was the youngest, and one of two women. Kianni wrote about her participation in the protest for Teen Vogue.

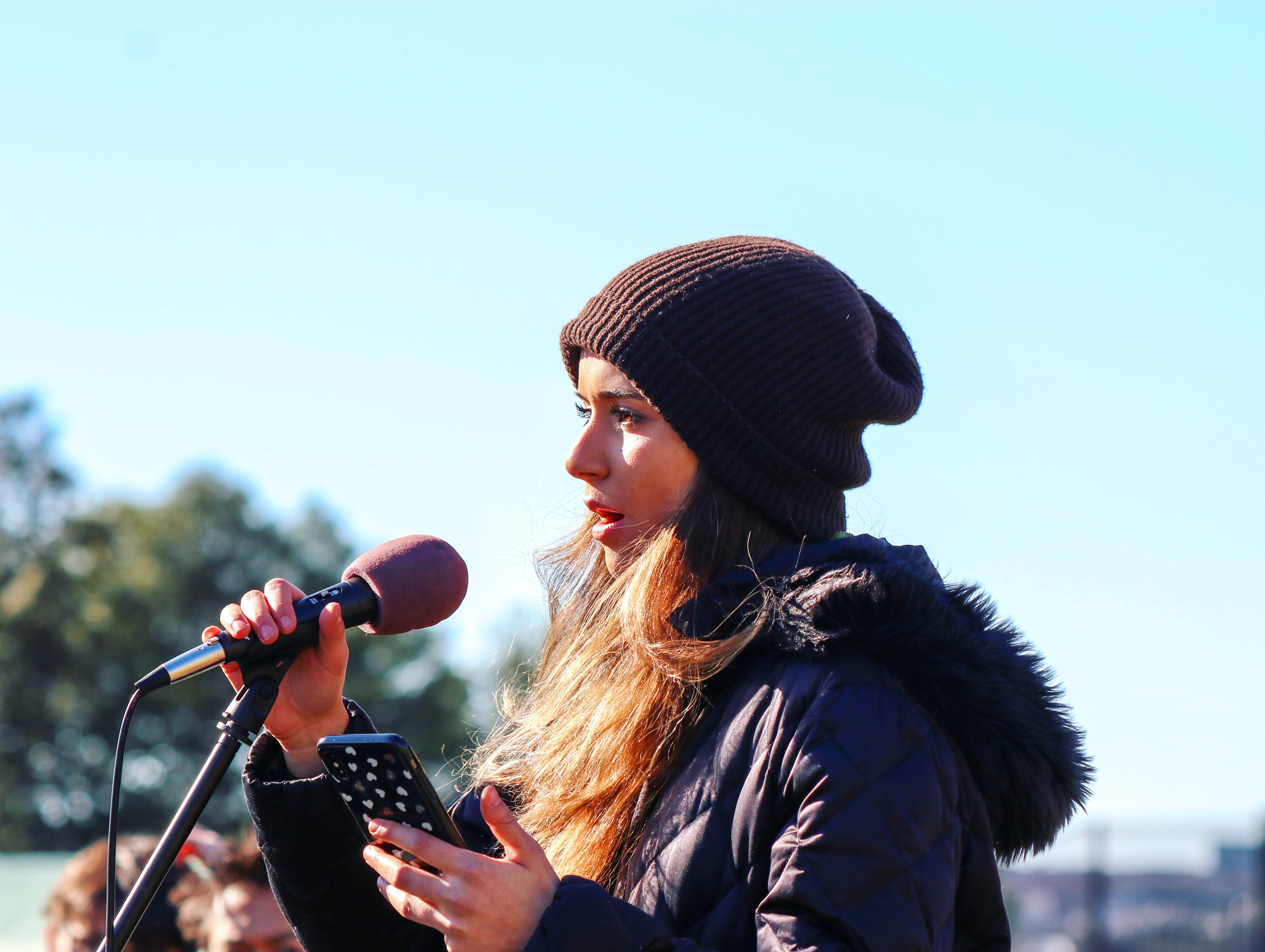
Kianni speaking at the Black Friday climate strike, 2019

In 2020, Kianni's physical activism was curtailed by the school closing and social distancing requirements of the COVID-19 pandemic, and her scheduled speaking engagements at colleges including Stanford University, Princeton University and Duke University were delayed. Kianni was able to continue her activism remotely with her talk at Michigan Technological University. In addition, Kianni decided to accelerate development of a planned nonprofit, Climate Cardinals, that would translate climate change information into different languages.

In July 2020, Kianni was named by United Nations Secretary-General António Guterres to his new Youth Advisory Group on Climate Change, a group of seven young climate leaders to advise him on action for the climate crisis. Kianni was the youngest in the group, which ranged from 18 to 28 years old. She was the only one representing the United States, and also the only one representing the Middle East and Iran.

In September 2021, Kianni was one of four co-chairs of the Youth4Climate event in Milan, preliminary to the 2021 United Nations Climate Change Conference or COP26. Climate Cardinals translated the resulting Youth4Climate manifesto into the 6 official languages of the United Nations. At COP26 itself, in November 2021 in Glasgow, Kianni spoke at several panels, and met with António Guterres, Secretary-General of the United Nations.

In October 2022, Kianni was covered by Vogue Arabia for representing the UN and speaking at COP27 in Sharm el-Sheikh, Egypt. At COP28, Kianni announced her We Wear Oil campaign, designed to draw attention to the contribution of fossil fuels used in fashion to the climate crisis. Images of her doused in apparent petroleum appeared in Women's Wear Daily and Vogue Arabia.

In 2023 she joined the board of directors of the Museum for the United Nations - UN Live, and was one of 16 appointed by Michael S. Regan to the first ever Environmental Protection Agency National Environmental Youth Advisory Council (NEYAC).

=== Writing and speaking ===
In 2020, she wrote two articles about the effects of the coronavirus, for the Middle East edition of Cosmopolitan magazine about the effects on her extended family's celebration of Nowruz, and another for Refinery29 about the effects on her daily schedule as a climate activist, which was widely syndicated. She wrote an article for MTV News for the 50th anniversary of Earth Day, which she helped coordinate, and another in 2022 for The Washington Post about how she lives sustainably in college. In 2023, she partnered with Greta Thunberg and Vanessa Nakate to write a CNN editorial calling US President Joe Biden's endorsement of the Alaskan oil drilling Willow project a betrayal.

In 2021, Kianni began hosting a podcast for The New Fashion Initiative, interviewing experts involved in the fashion industry about addressing climate change.

Kianni has spoken at several conferences around the world, including Web Summit, the 2022 Arch Summit, Washington Post Live, BBYO Insider, Public Interest Environmental Law Conference, New York Times Events' Climate Hub, and TED Countdown.

== Climate Cardinals ==
Climate Cardinals is an international non-profit organization founded by Kianni in 2020 to offer information about climate change in every language. It was named for the northern cardinal, the state bird of Virginia, and a metaphor for information flying around the world. Kianni was inspired by the years she spent translating English-language climate change articles into Persian for her Iranian relatives, as Iranian media barely covered the subject. She says she noticed informational content about climate change is either available only in English, or at best in Chinese and Spanish, making them inaccessible to speakers of other languages.

Climate Cardinals was launched in May 2020, and had 1100 volunteers sign up to become translators on its first day. They also partnered with Radio Javan, a Persian-language radio with over 10 million followers, to share graphics and translations with Iranians. Climate Cardinals is sponsored by Future Incubator as a 501(c)(3) nonprofit, which allows students who participate in its translations to earn community service hours for their work, either fulfilling school requirements or improving college applications. By August 2020, the group had over 5,000 volunteers, with an average age of 16.

== Phia ==
=== Origin ===
In April 2025, Kianni and her Stanford roommate Phoebe Gates launched iPhone online shopping platform Phia (a portmanteau of both their first names). They describe Phia as an AI shopping assistant, that learns from the user's searches, compares fashion items to 300 million others in its database, and suggests a secondhand alternative, which can save the user 75% of the price, and 80% carbon reduction compared to buying the item new.

Phia began in 2023 as a school project, a browser extension that would compare the prices of secondhand fashion items. Phia's first investor was the professor who had assigned Gates and Kianni the project; by 2026, they had $43 million in funding (from investors including Hailey Bieber, Kris Jenner, and Sheryl Sandberg), a $185 million valuation, and over a million users. They claimed that they specifically did not ask for investment from Gates's parents, Bill and Melinda Gates, both among the 100 wealthiest people in the world.

In 2026, the company had 10 employees and an office Shiba Inu dog, and was based in Union Square, Manhattan. Later that year, Phia was accused of fraudulently taking commission for sales it didn't drive.

=== Fraud investigation ===
In July 2026, Bloomberg, Capital One, and independent consultant Ben Edelman accused the Phia app of fraudulently and deceptively taking commission for fake clicks and sales it did not drive, known as "cookie stuffing", and was suspended from the leading affiliate and influencer platform impact.com. Independent consultant Ben Edelman stated that statements made by the leadership of Phia, claiming it was a "bug", are misleading and concluded that "Deliberately building and deploying a feature called 'auto_drop' that automatically sets affiliate tracking — cannot be dismissed as a mere bug. It's intentional, and it violates both trust and contract". In August 2026, Bloomberg reported, citing leaked Slack messages and people familiar with the matter, that Gates and Kianni had known since at least December 2025 that Phia was engaging in cookie stuffing and had discussed the practice with executives and engineers, despite the company’s earlier statement that it became aware of the issue only after being contacted by Bloomberg.

=== The Burnouts ===
Gates and Kianni launched a weekly podcast, The Burnouts, at the same time as Phia. This podcast is part of Alex Cooper's Unwell network, and played on YouTube, Instagram and TikTok, with a total of over half a million subscribers between the sites. On The Burnouts, Gates and Kianni talk about their company, and interview entrepreneurs such as Kris Jenner, Bobbi Brown, Gary Vaynerchuk, and Whitney Wolfe Herd.

== Recognition ==
In December 2020, Kianni was named one of Vice magazine's Motherboard 20 Humans of 2020, for being the U.S. representative for United Nations Youth Advisory Group on Climate Change and starting Climate Cardinals. In the same year, she was named as a National Geographic Explorer.

In December 2021, Kianni was named one of Teen Vogue's "21 under 21" for her climate activism.

In November 2022, she was named one of the Forbes 30 Under 30 for Climate Activism for 2023. Business Insider named her one of the "Climate Action 30" global leaders working toward climate solutions.

In November 2023, Kianni was named to the BBC's 100 Women list (one of the world's inspiring and influential women).

In September 2025, Kianni and Gates were named among The World’s Most Influential Rising Stars by Time Magazine.
