= Chiara Ferragni =

Italian blogger and influencer (born 1987)

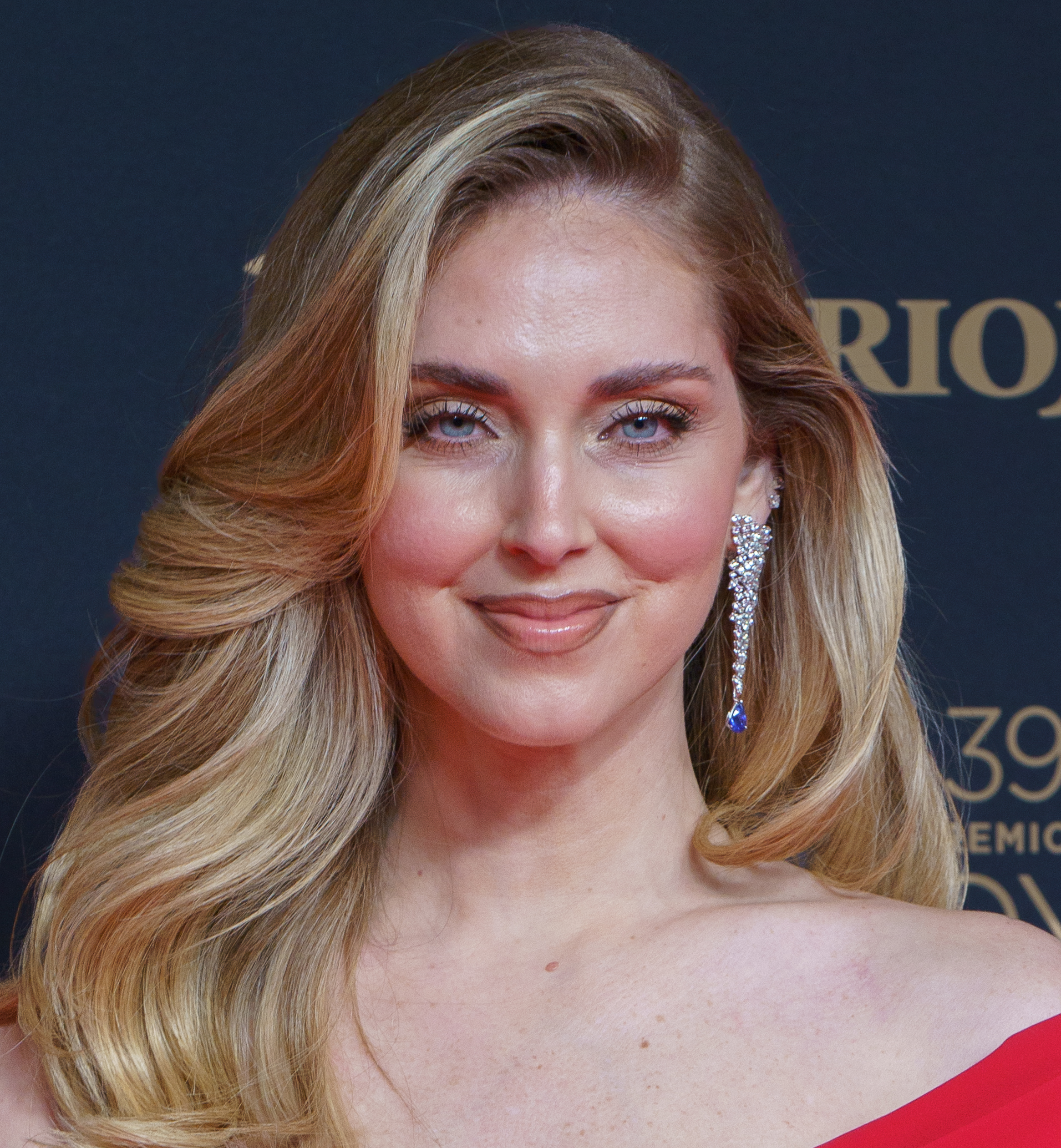
- Ferragni in 2025
- Born: 1987; Cremona, Italy
- Years active: 2009−present
- Known for: Designer for Tod's; Pandorogate; Ferragni Law
- Height: 1.75 m (5 ft 9 in)
- Spouse: Fedez (m. 2018; div. 2025)
- Partner(s): Riccardo Pozzoli (2009–2014); Andrew Arthur (2015–2016); Giovanni Tronchetti Provera (2024–2025)
- Children: 2
- Mother: Marina Di Guardo

Instagram information
- Page: chiaraferragni
- Followers: 27.4 million

TikTok information
- Page: chiaraferragni
- Followers: 6.5 million
- Last updated: 24 May 2026
- Website: theblondesalad.com

Chiara Ferragni (Italian: [ˈkjaːra ferˈraɲɲi]; born 1987) is an Italian blogger and influencer. Since 2021, Ferragni has been the center of controversy as the protagonist of the Pandorogate fraud scandal in which she profited millions of euros while claiming to be raising funds for charity.

Prior to the scandal, Ferragni had built a following using her blog, The Blonde Salad, started with an ex-boyfriend in 2009. She collaborated with multiple brands, including Diego Della Valle's fashion house, Tod's, for which she designed a collection, and served on its board from 2021 to 2022, until her tenure ended amid the Pandorogate scandal.

Pandorogate resulted in major damage to her career and was reported to be the reason for her 2024 separation from Fedez, who divorced her following the allegations. In 2023, she was required to pay a €1 million fine for fraud by the Italian Competition Authority, which she initially claimed she would appeal but instead accepted responsibility. She was also indicted on criminal charges for aggravated fraud in conjunction with the same investigation. The aggravated fraud charge was dismissed after she made €3,400,000 in restitution payments resulting in the charge being reduced to fraud.

The Pandorogate scandal led to the passage of the so-called "Ferragni Law" in Italy to codify penalties against future fraud and false advertising by influencers.

== Career ==
Ferragni was born in the northern city of Cremona in 1987. Ferragni is the oldest of three daughters. Her father was a dentist. Her mother Marina Di Guardo is an Italian writer from Sicily who also worked as deputy director of the Blumarine fashion house. At the age of 16, she was hired by the Beatrice model agency in Milan. She modeled for the agency for a couple of years and then quit, due to "other goals to reach in my life". She started her fashion blog "The Blonde Salad" in October 2009 with an ex-boyfriend, Riccardo Pozzoli. Her business ventures grossed about $8 million (mostly from her Chiara Ferragni Collection footwear) in 2014. She appeared on Project Runway as a guest judge during season 13 in August that year. Ferragni was on the cover of the April 2015 Vogue España.

In July 2015, while she was collaborating with Diego Della Valle's company Tod's, she was implicated in the company's trademark infringement scandal when the company was sued for copying a small luxury handbag designer's trademark after an exchange with Ferragni. She was included in Forbes 30 Under 30 the same year. In 2017, Ferragni was chosen to design costumes for the 4th edition of Intimissimi on ice. On 26 July 2017, she opened her first Chiara Ferragni Collection store in Milan. In June 2020, the Italian rapper Baby K released "Non mi basta più" featuring Chiara Ferragni. She and her then-husband Fedez raised €3 million in 24 hours through a fundraiser to support the San Raffaele Hospital in Milan during the COVID-19 pandemic in Italy.

In April 2021, she joined the board of Tod's Group, serving until 2024 when she was removed when she became the subject of the Pandorogate. In May 2021, Ferragni unveiled the Nespresso × Chiara Ferragni collection on her social media. A temporary pop-up cafe was set up in celebration of the capsule. In 2022, she announced the launch of her own line of fragrance with Angelini, the line was abandoned by Angelini after her Pandorogate crimes became public.

During the 2021-2022 holidays, Ferragni partnered with Balocco in 2022 to market a branded Balocco pandoro promising the proceeds would be given to charity but did not make the promised donations. This led to her being engulfed in controversy as the protagonist of the Pandorogate fraud scandal in which she is alleged to have unjustly profited millions of euros while claiming to be raising funds for charity. In March 2024, she was also removed from the board of Tod's as she came under investigation. Angelini also abandoned its line with her.

In 2023, she was required to pay a $1 million fine for fraud by the Italian Competition Authority. In January 2025, she was sent to trial on criminal charges for aggravated fraud in conjunction with the same investigation.

The Pandorogate scandal led to the passage of the Ferragni Law in Italy to prevent future fraud and false advertising by influencers. On 29 January 2025, shortly after the news of the trial for aggravated fraud, Ferragni publicly vented against her ex-husband, accusing him of having always been a false and untruthful person towards her. Ferragni accused him of having had affairs with many other women. In June 2025, it was reported that she was being sued by Safilo for €5.9 million for breach of contract.

== Pandorogate ==
In December 2023, the Italian Competition Authority (Italian: Autorità Garante della Concorrenza e del Mercato, AGCM) announced that Ferragni and companies under her control must pay a fine of 1.075 million euros following a probe into unfair and misleading commercial practices. The probe and resulting sanctions were the result of a partnership between Ferragni and the Italian food company Balocco in 2022 to market a Ferragni-branded Balocco pandoro, which is a cake-like bread popular in Italy at Christmas. The antitrust authority ruled that when buying a Ferragni-branded Balocco pandoro cake, customers were misled into thinking that by purchasing the product, they were contributing to charity donations to fund bone cancer research at the Regina Margherita hospital in Turin, further suggested by the price differential of over 9 euros for a Ferragni-branded Balocco pandoro cake, when a comparable Balocco pandoro costs under 4 euros.

The regulator said no part of the retail price paid or revenues raised from sales were donated to charity. Whilst Balocco had made a one-off donation of 50,000 euro to the hospital months before launching the Ferragni-branded pandoro, no portion of the price paid by customers nor revenues raised through sales of the product were donated to charity. Despite Ferragni being paid over 1 million euros for the branding initiative and related promotional activities, the regulator said customers were also misled into thinking Ferragni was contributing to the charity when neither Ferragni nor any of the sanctioned companies under Ferragni's control donated any money to the Turin hospital. Fabio Maria Damato was held responsible for the communication and management failure in the legal dispute called pandorogate by the media, and partly also for Ferragni's marital and financial failure, a reason for conflict and friction with her ex-husband because Fedez could not stand him at work and proximity, and was terminated on 13 June 2024, effective 16 June 2024.

Ferragni has suffered significant financial losses and very serious damage to her image which have undermined her credibility as a public figure and influencer and for this reason many brands have given up and closed collaboration contracts. The Milan Public Prosecutor's Office accused Ferragni and Damato of aggravated fraud. Ferragni and her companies were in financial trouble, and the minor shareholders were threatening legal action. On 26 June 2025, it was announced that the companies attributable to her were losing 5.7 million euros.

=== Criminal trial ===
Pandorogate criminal trial of Chiara Ferragni
- Court: Milan Courthouse
- Started: 23 September 2025
- Charge: Aggravated fraud

On 29 January 2025, Ferragni was bound over to trial for aggravated fraud, which began in September 2025. In January 2026, a judge ruled that prosecutors had not proven that the fraud was "aggravated" under Italian criminal law, stating that her actions simply constituted fraud. Since the crime of simple fraud requires a complaint to be prosecuted and Codacons had withdrawn its complaint at the end of 2024, Ferragni and Damato were acquitted because Ferragni paid €3,400,000 to all parties involved, and therefore the aggravated fraud charge was dropped because the charges were withdrawn making the case simple fraud. It was unclear if prosecutors would appeal.

== Ferragni Law ==
In the aftermath of Pandorogate, the Italian government enacted the "Ferragni Law" in 2024. The law regulates influencers with over 1 million followers to prevent future cases of fraud and false advertising.

== Personal life ==
Ferragni and Italian rapper Federico Lucia, known as Fedez, started dating in September 2016 and married on 1 September 2018 in Noto, Sicily. They have two children, born 2018 and 2021. They separated in early 2024 after Ferragni was sanctioned for the Pandorogate scandal, and divorced in mid-2025.

== Filmography ==
Year	Title	Role	Notes
2014	Project Runway	Guest judge	Episode: "Rock the Wedding"
2019	Chiara Ferragni - Unposted	Herself	Documentary
2020	Making the Cut	Judge	6 episodes
2020	Germany's Next Top Model	Guest judge	Episode: "Kalander Girls"
2021–2023	The Ferragnez: The Series	Herself	Docuseries
2023	Sanremo Music Festival 2023	Co-host in first and fifth night	Annual music festival

== Discography ==
Singles
Title	Year	Charts	Album
Title	Year	IT	Album
"Non mi basta più" (Baby K featuring Chiara Ferragni)	2020	3	Donna sulla Luna
