= Climate Cardinals =

International climate action organization

- Founded: 2020
- Founder: Sophia Kianni
- Type: Youth-led organization
- Purpose: Climate education and translation
- Region served: Worldwide
- President: Sophia Kianni
- Executive director: Hikaru Wakeel Hayakawa
- Volunteers: 19,000+
- Website: www.climatecardinals.org

Climate Cardinals is a global climate education organization focused on making climate action accessible to non-English speakers through large-scale translation and education initiatives. Since its launch in 2020, Climate Cardinals has grown into one of the world's largest climate education organizations.

== History ==
Climate Cardinals was founded in 2020 by climate activist Sophia Kianni, together with a group of high school friends. The idea emerged from Kianni's experience visiting relatives in Iran, where she discovered that her family—and billions of others—had little access to climate information in their first language. Kianni learned that the vast majority of peer-reviewed climate research is published in English, despite the fact that the majority of the world's population does not speak the language.

A small volunteer initiative quickly scaled into a global movement. Early volunteers included Hikaru Wakeel Hayakawa, Rohan Arora, and Joe Hobbs.

Climate Cardinals has since partnered with major institutions—including the United Nations, Clinton Global Initiative, and Deloitte, and received philanthropic support from Google in 2023 to expand its translation capacity.

In September 2024, Hayakawa was appointed full-time executive director.

== Description ==
=== Mission ===
Climate Cardinals is a not-for-profit global climate education organization based in the United States. It is a focused on making climate action accessible to non-English speakers through large-scale translation and education initiatives. Its mission is to break language and action barriers in the climate movement so every community can take action and protect their future.

=== Governance and structure ===
Climate Cardinals is a fiscally sponsored project under Future Incubator.

As of January 2026, the organization is led by executive director Hikaru Wakeel Hayakawa.

Climate Cardinals is advised by environmental leaders and policy experts, including:

- Hugh Evans – CEO & co-founder of Global Citizen
- Sylvia Earle – Oceanographer and National Geographic Explorer-in-Residence
- Ryan Hathaway – Biden-Harris White House Director of Environmental Justice

== Programs and activities ==
Climate Cardinals runs the largest translation project in the climate sector, making climate information accessible in 105+ languages. Volunteers and professional linguists work together to provide free translations for grassroots organizations and affordable services for larger institutions. Revenue from translation services fuels youth-led climate education efforts.

The organization's Chapters Program coordinates more than 85+ student-led chapters in 20+ countries, with 84% located in the Global South. These chapters focus on local climate education, advocacy, and action tailored to community needs.

The Fellowship Program trains the next generation of social impact leaders. Since its launch, 250 fellows have completed the program, with alumni going on to advise the WHO Director-General and receive scholarships to leading universities.

=== Participation in other groups ===
The organization's leadership has participated in advisory groups, including:

- UN Secretary-General's Youth Advisory Group on Climate Change
- UNESCO Youth Climate Action Network
- World Health Organization Youth Council
- U.S. Environmental Protection Agency National Environmental Youth Advisory Council

== Recognition and media coverage ==
Founder Sophia Kianni has been recognized in a number of ways for her creation of Climate Cardinals as well as other work, including:

- Forbes 30 Under 30 Social Impact (2023)
- National Geographic Young Explorer
- BBC's 100 Women

Hikaru Wakeel Hayakawa was named in the "Grist 50" list in 2024.
