= Phoebe Gates =

American entrepreneur (born 2002)

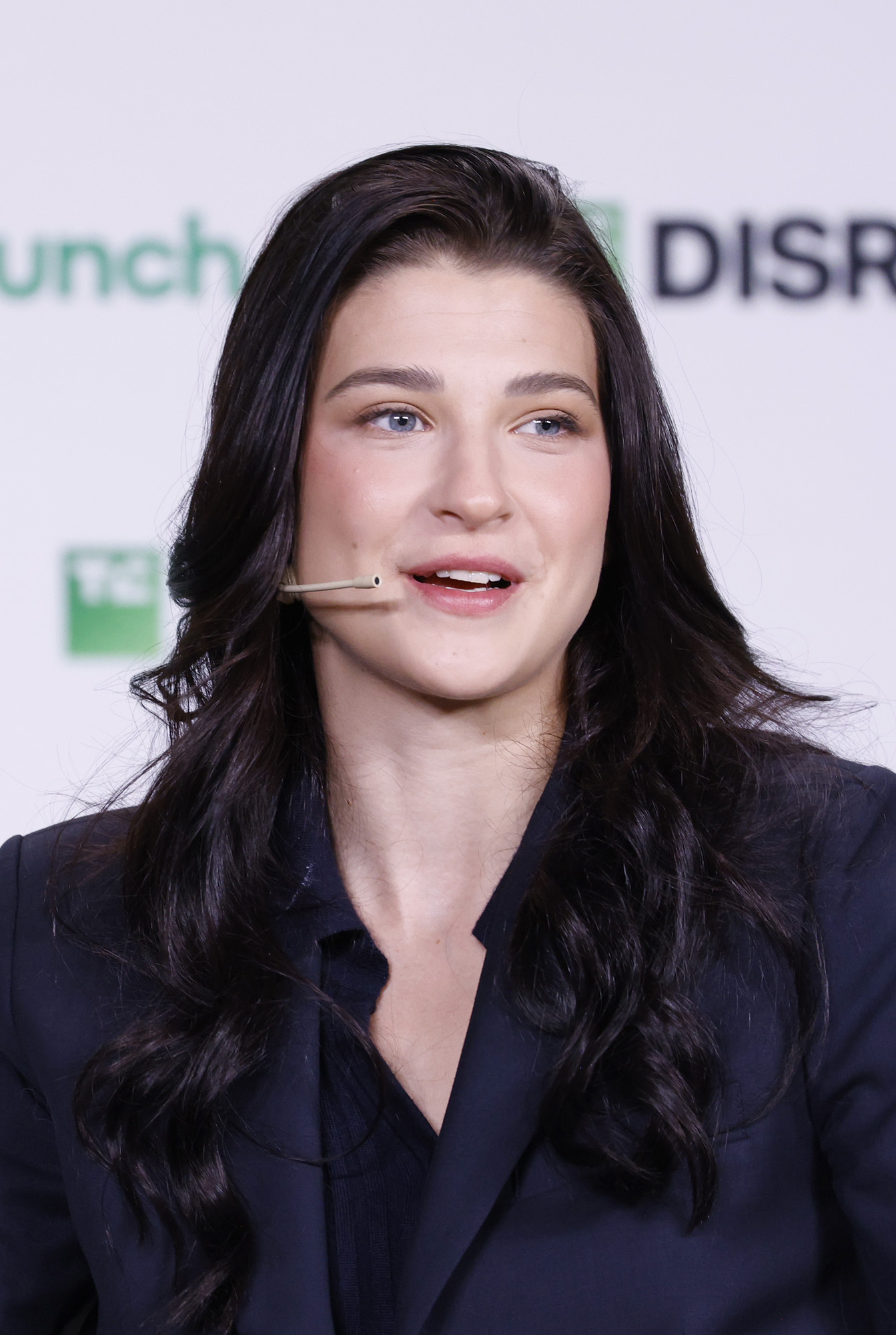
- Gates in 2025
- Born: Phoebe Adele Gates; September 14, 2002 (age 24); Seattle, Washington, U.S.
- Education: Stanford University (BS)
- Occupations: Entrepreneur, women's health advocate, social media influencer
- Known for: Co-founder of Phia, podcast host, reproductive rights advocacy
- Parents: Bill Gates (father); Melinda French Gates (mother)
- Relatives: Gates family

Phoebe Adele Gates (born September 14, 2002) is an American entrepreneur, women's health advocate, and social media influencer. The youngest of the three children of Bill Gates and Melinda French Gates, she is recognized for her work in sustainable fashion, reproductive rights, and public health. Gates is the co-founder of the digital fashion platform Phia and a co-host of the podcast The Burnouts.

In July 2026, Bloomberg News reported that Gates' start-up had been accused of charging commissions for clicks and sales it did not generate, prompting allegations of fraud involving Gates and increased public scrutiny of the platform's business practices.

== Early life and education ==
Phoebe Adele Gates was born in Seattle, Washington, as the youngest of three children to Bill Gates and Melinda French Gates after older sister Jennifer and older brother Rory. She attended the Lakeside School before enrolling at Stanford University, where she earned a Bachelor of Science in human biology with a minor in African studies in June 2024, graduating in three years. Her mother, Melinda French Gates, delivered the commencement speech at her graduation.

== Career ==
=== Phia ===
Gates co-founded Phia, a digital fashion platform, in January 2023 alongside her former Stanford roommate Sophia Kianni. The platform launched in beta in late 2024 and is intended to help shoppers find deals and make more environmentally conscious purchasing decisions.

In January 2026, Gates was named to the Forbes 30 Under 30 list. She and Kianni were also named to Time magazine's Time 100 Next rising stars list. In October 2025, Time also named the Phia app as one of the best inventions of the year.

Fraud investigation

In July 2026, the Phia app was accused of fraudulently and deceptively taking commission for fake clicks and sales it did not drive, known as "cookie stuffing", and was suspended from the leading affiliate and influencer platform impact.com. An investigation by Bloomberg News, as well as findings from independent consultant Ben Edelman, found that if a user shopped at an online retailer — even if they arrived at the site on their own or through another affiliate program like Wirecutter — Phia would open a new tab in the background. During the checkout process, Phia would override the referral codes from other affiliates and instead inject its own, allowing it to take credit for and potentially receive a commission on a purchase it didn't earn. Edelman stated that statements made by the leadership of Phia, claiming it was a "bug", are misleading and concluded that "Deliberately building and deploying a feature called "auto_drop" that automatically sets affiliate tracking — cannot be dismissed as a mere bug. It's intentional, and it violates both trust and contract". In August 2026, Bloomberg reported, citing leaked Slack messages and people familiar with the matter, that Gates and Kianni had known since at least December 2025 that Phia was engaging in cookie stuffing and had discussed the practice with executives and engineers, despite the company’s earlier statement that it became aware of the issue only after being contacted by Bloomberg.

=== Media and advocacy ===
Gates is an active advocate for women's health and reproductive rights, working with organizations such as Reproductive Freedom for All, which recognized her as its 2024 "Rising Reproductive Freedom Champion." She has spoken at conferences and festivals, including Goalkeepers and Global Citizen NOW, and has contributed essays on gender equality for publications such as Vogue and Teen Vogue. Gates also uses her social media platforms to raise awareness about sustainability, fashion, and reproductive health.

In April 2025, Gates and Kianni launched The Burnouts, a podcast under Alex Cooper's Unwell Network, focusing on their experiences as young entrepreneurs and the challenges of building a startup. Gates has described the podcast as an unfiltered look into the realities of entrepreneurship, aiming to inspire and connect with a new generation of women in business.

== Public health and philanthropy ==
Gates has participated in global health initiatives, including attending the United Nations General Assembly with her mother and interning with Partners In Health in Rwanda.

== Personal life ==
Gates briefly dated Arthur Donald, the grandson of Paul McCartney.
