= Forbes 30 Under 30 =

Set of lists recognizing young professionals

Forbes logo.

Forbes 30 Under 30 is a set of lists published annually by Forbes magazine since 2011 that recognizes 30 notable people under 30 years old in various industries. The American list consists of 600 people, with 30 selected in each of 20 sectors. The Asia and Europe lists each have 10 categories for a total of 300 people each, while Africa has a single list of 30 people. Forbes hosts associated conferences and a section of its website called 30 Under 30. The nomination process for Forbes 30 Under 30 is open to the public, and people may nominate themselves or another as long as the nominee is under 30 years of age.

The final 30 under 30 list published by Forbes is divided into different categories of industries: Art & Style, Hollywood & Entertainment, Retail & E-Commerce, Healthcare, Consumer Technology, Sports, Marketing and Advertising, Energy, Science, Media, Music, Social Media, Manufacturing & Industry, Social Impact, Finance, Venture Capital, Food & Drink, Education, Enterprise Technology, and Games.

According to Forbes, the 30 honorees under the age of 30 in each industry list are scouted and selected by the editors of Forbes, independent judges, celebrity judges, and industry experts.

== History ==
Forbes launched its 30 Under 30 list in 2011 under the direction of the editor-in-chief, Randall Lane. By 2016, nominations had surpassed 15,000, with Forbes editors and industry experts selecting 30 winners per category based on stated criteria including innovation, impact, and leadership. Over time, Forbes expanded the initiative to include regional lists for Asia (launched in 2016), Europe (2016), and Africa.

By 2022, Forbes reported over 100,000 nominations. To mark the 10th anniversary, Forbes introduced the 30 Under 30 Hall of Fame, who were Forbes 30 under 30 honorees over the years, such as Nobel Peace Prize winner Malala Yousafzai, Facebook founder Mark Zuckerberg, athlete LeBron James, musician Miley Cyrus, media personality Kylie Jenner and Spotify founder Daniel Ek.

Forbes also leveraged the 30 Under 30 brand through a dedicated digital channel and a social media app, developed in collaboration with Tinder co-founder and Forbes 30 under 30 honoree Sean Rad, to engage millennials and promote networking among young professionals.

== Forbes 30 under 30 Summits ==
In addition to the magazine feature, Forbes hosts an annual Forbes 30 Under 30 Summit. In 2014 and 2015, the summit was held in Philadelphia, with Monica Lewinsky making headlines at the first summit for her address on cyberbullying. The 2016 and 2017 summits were both held in October in Boston. Organizers include previous 30 Under 30 honorees chef Chris Coombs, Boston mayoral aide Dan Koh, and pediatric oncology professor Cigall Kadoch.

In April 2016, Forbes held its first 30 Under 30 international summit, focused on Europe, the Middle East and Africa and took place in Tel Aviv and Jerusalem. Speakers included Lewinsky, Shimon Peres and Okieriete Onaodowan. Onaodowan was a 2016 honoree on the 30 Under 30 Hollywood & Entertainment list for his portrayal of Hercules Mulligan and James Madison in Hamilton.

Botswana was the first African country to host Forbes 30 Under 30 in April 2022.

In 2023, the Forbes 30 under 30 Summit was held in Cleveland, Ohio, with speakers such as Kendall Jenner (2024 honoree in the Art & Style category), Bad Bunny (2019 honoree in the Music category) and Machine Gun Kelly.

== Reception ==
=== Demographics of honorees ===
The 30 Under 30 list has drawn criticism for under-representation of women and members of racial minority groups in the early years of the list. The Root observed that 29 of 30 journalists honored on the inaugural Media category list in 2011 were white, and none were of African descent or Latino. Elle South Africa noted the gender imbalance of the 2014 lists, asking, "Where are the women?" Demographics of the Forbes selections have also been discussed by Poynter, which reported that the 2015 Media list had 18 women, the most in the list's five-year history.

=== "Forbes-to-fraud pipeline" criticism ===
There have been some 30 Under 30 honorees over the years who later became involved in highly publicized scandals or criminal proceedings, often related to finance, especially in the Finance category. The scandals of those honorees have been described by some critics in opinion pieces as the "curse of the Forbes 30 Under 30"; George Pendle and Jack Sullivan wrote in Air Mail that "few things are as reliable in prophesying a fall from grace as 30 Under 30". One investor estimated that the sum total of funds raised by 30 Under 30 honorees was less than the total dollar value of frauds and scams that those honorees who were involved in scandals have been arrested for.

In 2023, Forbes published a "hall of shame" article describing the following 10 picks as "duds":

- Sam Bankman-Fried, Finance, 2021 (41st richest American who was subsequently convicted of financial fraud and conspiracy)
- Caroline Ellison, Finance, 2022 (Bankman-Fried's co-conspirator)
- Charlie Javice, Finance, 2019 (convicted for financial fraud and conspiracy)
- Nate Paul, Finance, 2016 (convicted of lying to lenders)
- Martin Shkreli, Finance, 2013 (stock manipulation)
- Cody Wilson, Law and Policy, 2014 (sex offender)
- James O'Keefe, Media, 2012 (financial malfeasance with donor money)
- Phadria Prendergast, Marketing and Media Europe, 2023 (ran operation linked to a religious cult)
- Steph Korey, Retail & E-commerce, 2016 (workplace bullying)
- Lucas Duplan, Finance, 2014 (misuse of raised funds)

Other 30 Under 30 honorees who were later implicated in controversy:

- Oren Alexander, a 2011 Real Estate honoree, convicted of sex trafficking
- Chiara Ferragni, 2015 honoree who defrauded donors in the Pandorogate scandal, resulting in the Ferragni Law
- Olivia Nuzzi, a 2018 honoree who engaged in a personal relationship with U.S. Presidential candidate Robert F. Kennedy Jr. while working as a political journalist and covering his campaign.
- Do Kwon, a 2019 Finance honoree, convicted of cryptocurrency fraud
- Joanna Smith-Griffin, a 2021 honoree charged with financial fraud
- Matilda Djerf, a 2023 honoree accused of workplace bullying
- Abraham Shafi, charged in 2024 with defrauding investors
- Gökçe Güven, a 2025 honoree charged with securities fraud, wire fraud, visa fraud, and aggravated identity theft.
- Karun Kaushik, CEO and co-founder of Delve, an AI compliance certification startup accused of fraud and intellectual property (IP) theft in 2026.
- Selin Kocalar, COO and co-founder of Delve, an AI compliance certification startup accused of fraud and IP theft in 2026.
- Ben Pasternak, charged in 2026 on strangulation and assault charges; he pleaded not guilty with trial scheduled to start in June 2026.
- Phoebe Gates, daughter of Bill Gates and co-founder of Phia, a browser extension accused of fraudulently taking credit for sales it did not drive. (Note: Gates appeared in the Forbes 30 Under 30 retail and ecommerce category in 2026 for founding Phia, separate from her cofounder's (Kianni's) 2023 appearance for founding Climate Cardinals. Kianni was not listed alongside Gates in 2026.)
- Sophia Kianni, co-founder of Phia, a browser extension accused of fraudulently taking credit for sales it did not drive. (Note: Kianni appeared in the Forbes 30 Under 30 social impact category in 2023 for founding Climate Cardinals, separate from her cofounder's (Gates') 2026 appearance for founding Phia. Kianni was not listed alongside Gates in 2026.)
- Leandro Leviste, CEO of Solar Philippines when he was on the Forbes 30 under 30 list in 2016. A decade later, he became the House of Representatives Member of the Philippines and was subsequently accused of corruption and plunder during his political term as of August 2026.

A high-profile executive, Elizabeth Holmes, was never selected for the 30 under 30 list, but was invited as a speaker at a Forbes 30 Under 30 Summit.

== See also ==
- Fortune's 40 Under 40
- WEF's Young Global Leaders
- Capital's Top 40 under 40
- MIT's Innovators Under 35
- The Business Journal's Forty Under 40
