= Chris Coombs =

American chef and restaurateur

Chris Coombs (born June 21, 1984) is an American chef and restaurateur who specializes in French-American cuisine. He is the co-owner of Boston Urban Hospitality, a restaurant group based in Boston, Massachusetts. Chris Coombs is also the co-founder of Bosse, a pickleball, fitness and dining complex in Natick, Massachusetts.

== Early life and education ==
Coombs grew up in Peabody, Massachusetts. His mother was a preschool teacher and his father worked in a factory as a millwright. Coombs' first job in the culinary industry was at age 11, washing dishes for a local seafood restaurant. He enrolled in The Culinary Institute of America (CIA), where he studied culinary arts from 2002 to 2004.

== Career ==
In 2003, Coombs began working under Ming Tsai at Blue Ginger in Wellesley, Massachusetts. Upon graduating, he headed to Nantucket Island in Massachusetts to work for a Relais & Chateau Property, Toppers at the Wauwinet. There he met chef and restaurateur Patrick O’Connell, who was impressed by Coombs and hired him after a 3-day try out. Coombs moved to Washington, Virginia to work at O’Connell's luxury inn and restaurant, The Inn at Little Washington. He remained at The Inn through 2005, cooking for Laura Bush, The White House, and Le Club des Chefs de Chef, among others.

Coombs returned to Boston in late 2005.[5] After working briefly at Aujourd’hui in the Four Seasons Boston, he worked at Troquet for approximately nine months. There he met Brian Piccini, the owner of dbar in Dorchester, Massachusetts.[6] Coombs subsequently prepared Sunday dinners at dbar and became its executive chef in August 2006. He changed the menu to emphasise local and seasonal ingredients. The Boston Herald later awarded dbar a three-star review. Coombs also established a rooftop garden that supplied produce to the restaurant.[7]

In 2010, Coombs opened Deuxave in Boston. Subsequently, he had two appearances on Food Network’s Chopped. Deuxave received a 3-star review from the Boston Globe in 2010 and AAA 4-Diamond recognition in 2014. The restaurant has been named “Best French Restaurant” by Boston magazine multiple times since opening. Deuxave received four stars from Forbes Travel Guide in 2017, one of three restaurants in Boston to currently carry that rating, and has retained that honor ever since.

In 2013, Coombs opened his third restaurant concept with Piccini, Boston Chops, in Boston's South End. The steakhouse champions nose-to-tail dining, where offal is prominently featured throughout the menu, along with traditional steak cuts. Boston Chops’ signature bone-in ribeye was featured on the cover of Food & Wine. The restaurant has garnered several awards, including Food & Wine’s “Best New Steak Houses”, and "Best Steakhouse 2015" from Boston magazine's Best of Boston awards.

Coombs was named Forbes magazine's 30 Under 30 in food and wine in 2013. That same year, Coombs was named in Zagat’s 30 Under 30 list. The Massachusetts Restaurant Association then named him Restaurateur of the Year in 2015. In the fall of 2015, Coombs competed in the Forbes 30 Under 30 cooking competition and won the People’s Choice award. Coombs has represented Deuxave at the James Beard House on several occasions, creating themed dinners for their guests. He has been a HP Hood Cream spokesperson since 2013 and wrote an e-cookbook for HP Hood Cream titled Chef Creations Inspired by Hood® Cream

In May 2018, Coombs opened a second installation of Boston Chops in the Downtown Crossing area of Boston. The restaurant expanded its predecessor’s private dining capabilities and added a lunch service five days a week. The opening garnered national attention largely due to its “Instagram Table”, a singular table in the restaurant's dining room with a secondary lighting system to enable quality photography of the meal for diners’ social media platforms. The table is only reserved via Instagram direct messaging, but is available to any guest. Boston Chops Downtown was named in “The Most Beautiful New Restaurants of 2018” by Eater and in “The 18 Best Restaurants in Boston” by Conde Nast Traveler.

Coombs and Piccini own Boston Urban Hospitality (BUH), the restaurant group encompassing their four restaurants. As of 2018, BUH also serves as a management company. BUH's executive chef Adrienne Wright, Coombs's creative partner and mentee, was a finalist on Bravo’s Top Chef in its sixteenth season. Coombs appeared on an episode of the season, serving as Wright's mentor. He also appeared in advertisements for Mercedes-Benz. He is the co-chair of the Forbes 30 Under 30 Food Festival and helped bring the festival to Boston annually. Coombs has appeared in food festivals internationally, including the South Beach Wine and Food Fest, and the New York City Wine and Food Fest.

== Personal life ==
Coombs has become somewhat of a fitness influencer, and credits his diet and exercise with helping him manage his ADHD. He advocates for this approach rather than utilizing additional medications.

== Current Restaurants ==
- dbar
- Deuxave
- Boston Chops South End
- Boston Chops Downtown
- Bosse
- Bosse Cafe
- Bosse Enoteca
- Bosse Sports Lounge
