= Marina Di Guardo =

Italian writer (born 1961)

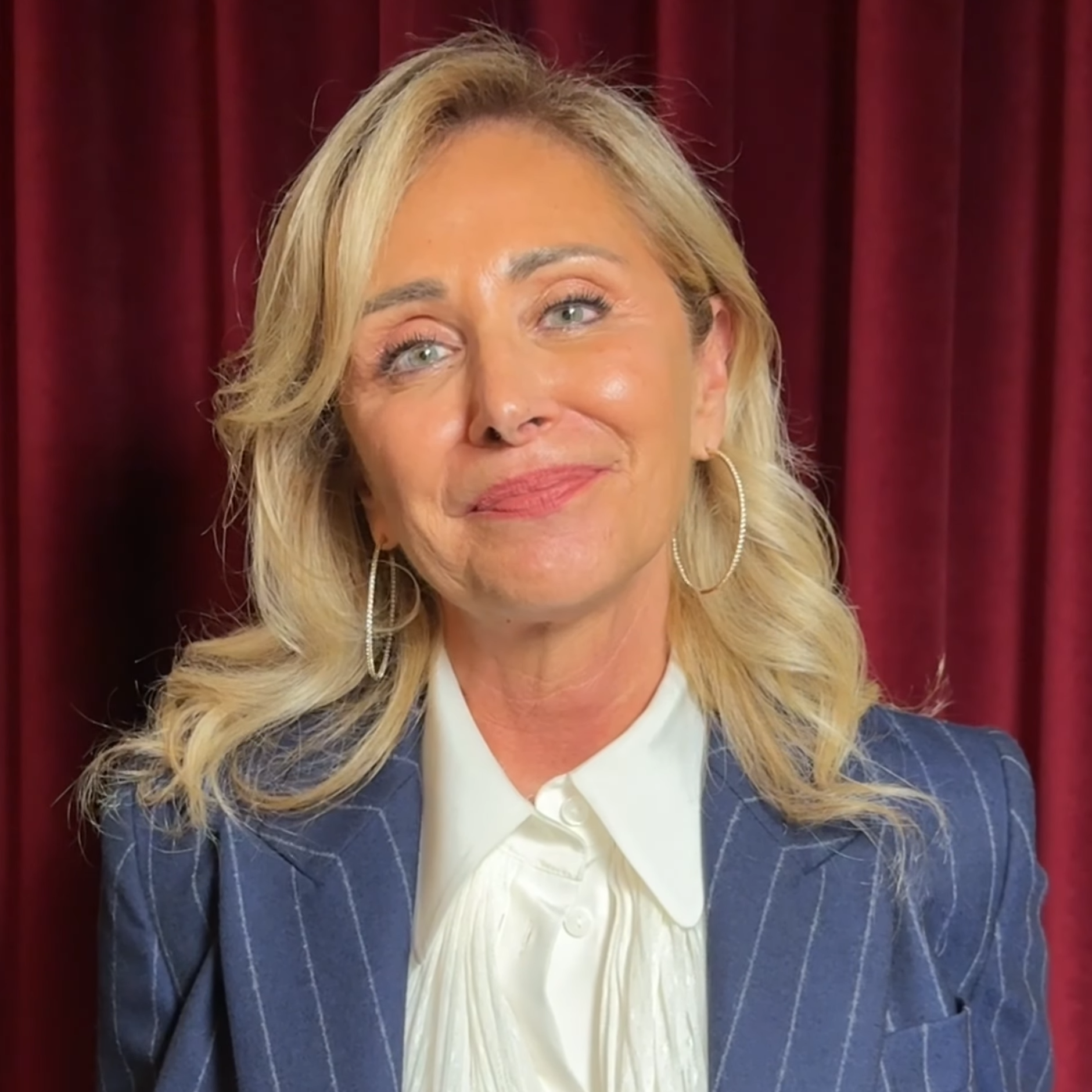
- Di Guardo in 2023
- Born: 29 October 1961 (age 64); Novara, Italy
- Occupation: Writer
- Spouse: Marco Ferragni (div. 2002)
- Children: 3, including Chiara Ferragni
- Writing career
- Notable work: La memoria dei corpi (2019)

Marina Di Guardo (born 29 October 1961) is an Italian writer.

== Early life and career ==
Born in Novara, Piedmont, to a family from Sicily, she worked as deputy director of the Blumarine showroom. Between 2019 and 2020, she made some appearances on the Mattino Cinque television program on Canale 5.

Her 2019 novel La memoria dei corpi, published by Mondadori, was translated in several countries. Her novel Dress code rosso sangue, also published by Mondadori in October 2021, is about a young woman working for a fashion company in Milan whose boss is murdered.

== Personal life ==
Di Guardo is the mother of influencers Chiara, Valentina and Francesca Ferragni, whom she had from her ex-husband Marco Ferragni before divorcing him in 2002.

== Works ==
- L'inganno della seduzione, Nulla Die, 2012. ISBN 9788897364283
- Non mi spezzi le ali, Nulla Die, 2014. ISBN 9788897364900
- Com'è giusto che sia, Mondadori, 2017. ISBN 9788804674047
- La memoria dei corpi, Mondadori, 2019. ISBN 9788804707981
- Nella buona e nella cattiva sorte, Mondadori, 2020. ISBN 9788804731412
- Dress code rosso sangue, Mondadori, 2021. ISBN 9788804742494
- Quello che ti nascondevo, Mondadori, 2023. ISBN 9788804781691
