= Pandorogate =

Italian influencer fraud scandal

Pandorogate is a fraud scandal surrounding Italian influencer Chiara Ferragni following revelations that she had promoted products claiming proceeds would go to charity while embezzling profits. The name is derived from pandoro, an Italian cake promoted by Ferragni. The scandal, first uncovered by journalist Selvaggia Lucarelli, involves multiple investigations into Ferragni's charitable partnerships with millions of euros in alleged unjust profits identified. The revelations created backlash in Italy against Ferragni. Over a million euros in fines were imposed on her and her companies while an indictment for aggravated fraud was obtained in January 2025 with a trial expected in September 2025. The scandal led to a law, informally referred to as the "Ferragni law", to regulate promotion by certain social media influencers to prevent future crimes of fraud and false advertising.

== Background ==
In December 2022, Selvaggia Lucarelli published an article in Domani skeptical whether sales of pandoro cakes promoted by Ferragni to support the Regina Margherita children's hospital were actually resulting in donations to the hospital. Despite promotions suggesting that purchases of the cakes resulted in support to the hospital, Lucarelli revealed that in reality no donations were made from the sales.

== Italian Competition Authority fine ==
In summer 2023, the Italian Competition Authority announced that it had started an investigation against the manufacturer of the cakes, Ferragni, and her companies. The investigations revealed that Chiara Ferragni and her companies had collected over one million euros while deceiving consumers who believed they were making a charitable contribution to the hospital by purchasing the cakes. The authority imposed a fine of 400,000€ on Ferragni personally along with a fine of 675,000€ to her companies. In response, Ferragni published on Instagram an apology for her actions and promised a donation of one million euros to the hospital. She appealed her punishment from the Competition Authority claiming it was unfair due to the hospital receiving benefits from the publicity generated by her promotion despite not receiving donations. She later renounced her appeal.

== Expanded investigations into Ferragni ==
In December 2023, the Italian Consumer Association filed reports against Ferragni with 104 prosecutors against the Italian influencer accusing her of aggravated fraud in the incident and asked the Financial Police to seize her accounts. In response, it was confirmed that investigations had been opened by state prosecutors in Milan, Cuneo, Prato, and Trento. The investigation in Milan expanded to include new charges of aggravated fraud against Ferragni for charity promotions by Ferragni in 2019 and 2021. The charities who were the advertised recipients of proceeds from both promotions confirmed that they had not received the proceeds with one declaring that they were strangers to the initiative. By January 2024, it was reported that there were five open investigations of fraud against Ferragni with two additional instances found by prosecutors in Cuneo.

In April 2024, the Competition Authority opened a new case against Ferragni for promotion of easter eggs in 2021 and 2022 which allegedly raised funds for charity without corresponding donations being made. The authority noted that it had closed an investigation into Ferragni's ex-husband Fedez for a similar promotion after concluding that he had properly made corresponding donations to charity for the sales. In October 2024, the Milan Public Prosecutors concluded that Ferragni had realized an unjust profit of 2,225,000€ in the two cases it was investigating, not including "non-pecuniary profit", and announced they would seek to indict her for aggravated fraud. In December 2024, Ferragni settled the complaint filed by Codacons the Italian Consumer Association against her agreeing to pay each consumer who had contacted the Codacons 150€ in compensation and make a donation of 200,000€ to charity. It was reported that her lawyers hoped the settlement would prevent Milan prosecutors from seeking her criminal conviction.

== Aggravated fraud prosecution ==
In January 2025, prosecutors in Milan announced that they had successfully indicted Ferragni on charges of aggravated fraud and would send the case to trial. The trial began in September 2025 with Ferragni facing up to five years in prison.

In January 2026, a judge ruled that prosecutors had not proven that the fraud was "aggravated" under Italian criminal law, stating that her actions simply constituted fraud. Since the crime of simple fraud requires a complaint to be prosecuted and Codacons had withdrawn its complaint at the end of 2024, Ferragni and Damato were acquitted because Ferragni paid €3,400,000 in restitution to all parties involved, and therefore the aggravated fraud charge was dropped because the charges were withdrawn making the case simple fraud. It was unclear if prosecutors would appeal.

== Resulting law ==
DDL Beneficenza, popularly known as the "Ferragni law" (named after Chiara Ferragni), is a law passed in 2024 in response to the scandal to regulate social media influencers with more than 1 million followers to combat scams and false advertising. Prime Minister Giorgia Meloni declared that despite Ferragni's sanction from the competition authority for deceptive advertising, the scandal had exposed a gap in the law regulating activities by influencers. It was proposed by Adolfo Urso, the Minister for Enterprises and Made in Italy. The law, a DDL (disegno di legge), was approved by the Council of Ministers on 25 January 2024. However, it was criticised by some for penalties being considered too low. The law was part of a wide-ranging backlash for Ferragni when her fraud was revealed which also included loss of sponsors and partnerships, divorce, fines of over €1 million, and prosecution for fraud.

=== Key provisions ===
- Regulator designation: the Italian Competition Authority is officially designated as the regulator responsible for monitoring influencers compliance with the Ferragni law.
- Product packaging: mandates that producers and professionals involved in marketing products for charitable purposes must prominently display specific information on the product packaging including the identity of the organization or entity that will receive the charitable proceeds; the specific purpose for which these funds are intended to be used; and the precise amount of money designated for charity if this amount is predetermined. If the charitable contribution is not a fixed sum, then the packaging must clearly state the percentage of the sale price or a fixed monetary amount per unit of product that will be directed towards the charitable activity. This information must be presented in a manner that is easily noticeable and understandable to consumers, potentially through the use of labels or stickers affixed to the packaging.
- Notice and confirmation: before selling products linked to a charitable initiative, producers must inform the AGCM of key details—beneficiary, purpose, donation amount or percentage, and the deadline for transferring funds. Within three months of that deadline, they must confirm the payment was made.
- Sanctions: the AGCM enforces compliance with the law and can impose fines from €5,000 to €50,000 for violations, adjusted based on severity, product price, and volume sold. Severe breaches can increase fines by two-thirds; minor ones can reduce them similarly. Repeat offenders risk suspension of business for up to a year. Sanctions must be publicly disclosed, with publication costs borne by the violator. Half of the collected fines will fund future charitable initiatives.
- Exemptions: the law does not apply to promotional, sales, or supply activities undertaken by non-commercial entities when these activities are for the purpose of self-financing.

== See also ==
- List of -gate scandals and controversies
