= Nayel Nassar =

Egyptian-American equestrian (born 1991)

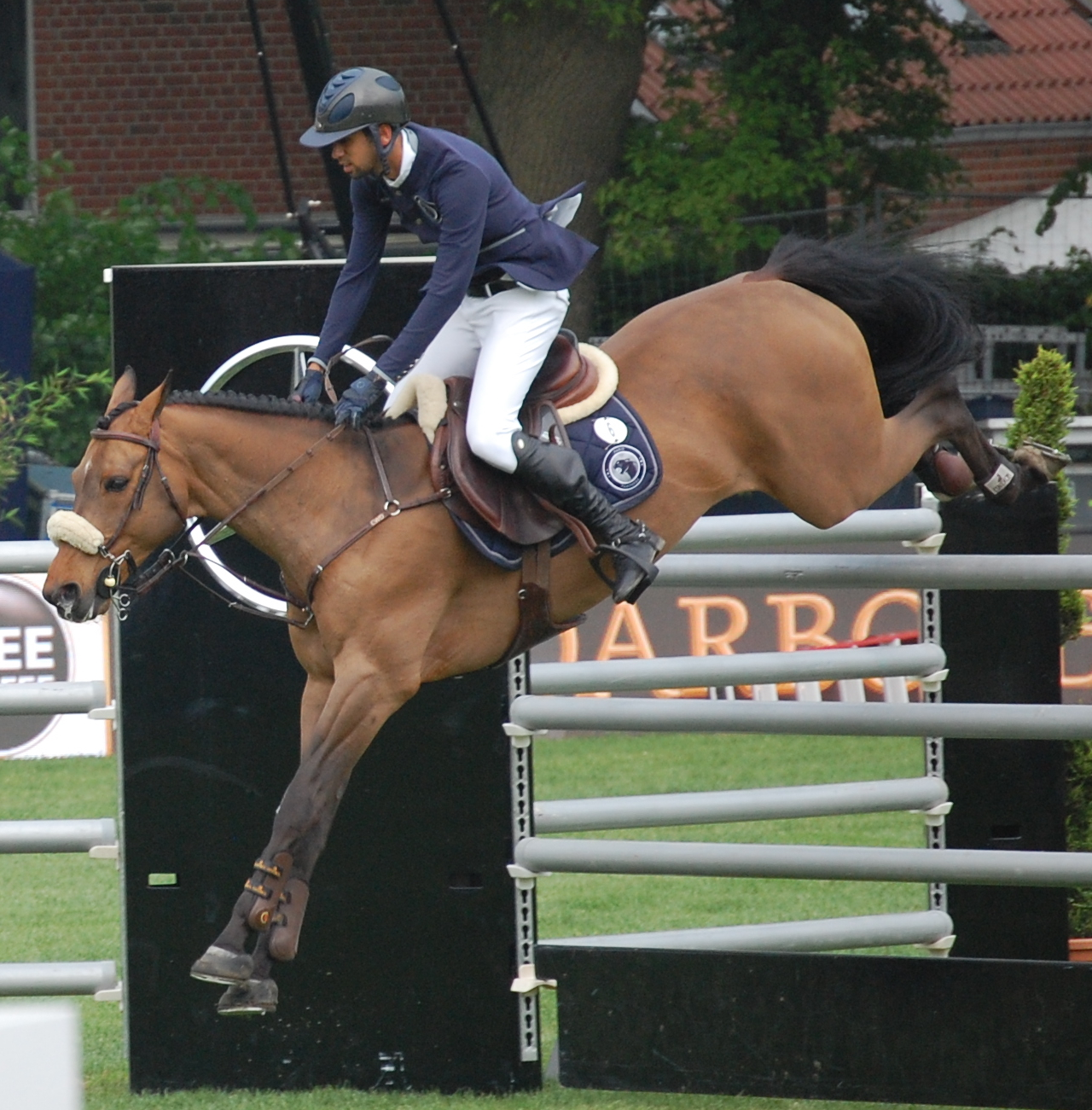
- Nassar at the Global Champions League in Hamburg, 2019
- Born: January 21, 1991 (age 35); Chicago, United States
- Education: Stanford University (AB)
- Spouse: Jennifer Gates (m. 2021)
- Children: 2

Nayel Nassar (born January 21, 1991) is an Egyptian professional equestrian.

== Early life and education ==
Nayel Nassar was born in Chicago, Illinois, to Egyptian parents, Fouad Nassar and Iman Harby, founders and managers of the Kuwaiti architectural firm Diwan Interiors International.

Nassar grew up in Kuwait before moving back to the United States in 2009 at the age of 18. He attended Stanford University and graduated in 2013 with a bachelor's degree in economics.

== Career ==
Nassar began riding at the age of five and specialized in show jumping by the age of ten. He has qualified for the International Federation for Equestrian Sports (FEI) Show Jumping World Cup Finals in 2013, 2014, and 2017, as well as the FEI World Equestrian Games in 2014. In addition, he competed in the Longines FEI World Cup Finals held in Paris and is a regular participant in the international Grand Prix circuit.

In 2012, he won the Artisan Farms Young Rider Grand Prix Series at the Winter Equestrian Festival.

Nassar qualified for the International Federation for Equestrian Sports (FEI) Show, Jumping World Cup Finals in 2013, 2014, and 2017, and the FEI World Equestrian Games in 2014. In addition, he competed at the Longines FEI World Cup Finals in Paris. Also, he regularly competes on the international Grand Prix circuit.

In February 2019, he won the cup at the Longines FEI World Cup Jumping Wellington after he finished the race in 38.15 seconds. In 2012, he won the Artisan Farms Young Rider Grand Prix Series at the Winter Equestrian Festival. He represented Egypt at the 2012 London Summer Olympics.

In April 2019, Nassar took home the $400,000 Longines Grand Prix of New York, the grand finale of the Longines Masters of New York. He was the first rider to win the Longines Speed Challenge and the Longines Grand Prix at the same event and the first to do it with the same horse.

In August 2021, Nassar qualified for the Final of the Tokyo 2020 Olympics with no penalties, riding his Best horse Igor at Equestrian Park. He participated in the 2020 Summer Olympic Games for Egypt, participating in the Individual Equestrian Jumping and Team Equestrian Jumping events.

Nassar was supposed to represent the Egyptian Equestrian team in the 2024 Paris Olympics Equestrian competition however he had to withdraw before the competition because his horse did not pass the second veterinarian inspection.

Nassar established his stables back in 2015 and called them Nthemsar Stables. The stables are located in Southern California. The business is based in the city of Encinitas in San Diego County.

== Notable results ==
- 1st place on Lordan – Longines FEI Jumping World Cup Las Vegas
- 1st place – Las Vegas National Horse Show Winning Round CSI 3
- 1st place – Longines FEI Jumping World Cup Del Mar
- 7th place – Longines FEI Jumping World Cup Langley
- 2nd place – Longines Global Champions Tour (LGCT) Valkenswaard CSI 5
- 2019 LGCT Hamburg Silver Medalist
- 1st place – New York Masters CSI 5 (5-star) Grand Prix
- 1st place – Rabat CSIO4 Designated Olympic Qualifier.

== Personal life ==
In October 2021, Nassar married Jennifer Gates, the eldest daughter of Microsoft co-founder Bill Gates and philanthropist Melinda French Gates, in Westchester County, New York. They have two daughters.
