= Balocco (company) =

Italian food company

Balocco S.p.A.
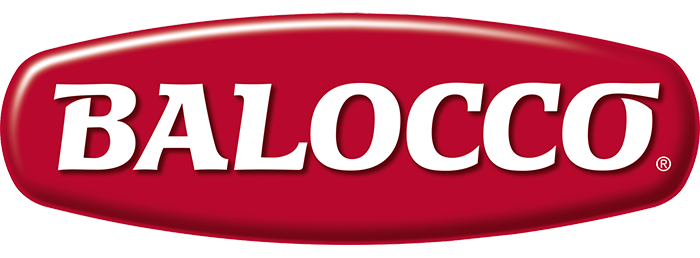
- Company type: Public
- Industry: Food
- Founded: 1927
- Founder: Francesco Antonio Balocco
- Headquarters: Fossano, Italy
- Key people: Francesco Antonio Balocco; Aldo Balocco; Diletta Balocco (CEO); Ruggero Costamagna (President)
- Products: Panettone; Pandoro; Biscuits; Wafers
- Website: www.balocco.it

Balocco S.p.A. is an Italian food company based in Fossano. It was founded in 1927.

Balocco produces a range of biscuits. The company exports products to about 30 countries and offers private-label production services.

== History ==
The company was founded in the small town of Fossano (about 70 km south of Turin) first as a pastry shop by Francesco Antonio Balocco.

From 1948, Balocco began to produce panettoni, pandori, colombe pasquali, biscuits and wafers.

Balocco began to industrially produce confectionery from 1970.

During the 1990s, the company was taken over by Aldo Balocco's sons, Alessandra and Alberto.

On June 2, 2010, Italian President Giorgio Napolitano named Aldo Balocco Knight of the “Order of Labor Merit”.

On July 2, 2022, in Milan, the son of the founder, Mr. Aldo Balocco, Honorary President of Balocco spa, died at the age of 91

The founder's grandson Alberto Balocco died at the age of 56 on 26 August 2022, struck by lightning together with a friend during a mountain bike trip a few kilometers from the Sestriere mountain pass.
