= Melinda French Gates =

American philanthropist (born 1964)

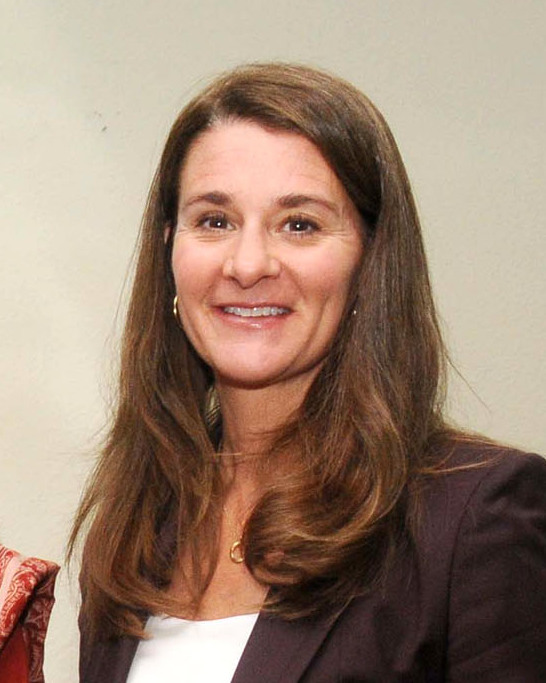
- French Gates in 2014
- Born: Melinda Ann French; August 15, 1964 (age 62); Dallas, Texas, U.S.
- Education: Duke University (BA, MBA)
- Occupations: Co-founder and former co-chair of Gates Foundation; Founder of Pivotal Ventures
- Political party: Democratic
- Spouse: Bill Gates (m. 1994; div. 2021)
- Children: 3, including Phoebe
- Honours: Presidential Medal of Freedom (2016); Padma Bhushan (2015)
- Website: Gates Co-Founder Profile; Pivotal Founder Profile

Melinda Ann French Gates (née French; born August 15, 1964) is an American philanthropist. Born and raised in Dallas, Texas, she attended Duke University, where she earned a bachelor's degree in computer science and economics and an MBA. She joined Microsoft in 1987 as a multimedia product developer. In the same year, she began dating the company's co-founder and then-chief executive Bill Gates, whom she married in 1994 and divorced in 2021. They have three children together.

From 2000 to 2024, she and Gates co-chaired the Bill & Melinda Gates Foundation, the world's largest private charitable organization. For their philanthropic endeavors, which focused on global health, development, and education, they received numerous awards and honors, including the U.S. Presidential Medal of Freedom and the French Legion of Honour. After French Gates resigned as co-chair in 2024, Gates became sole chair of the renamed Gates Foundation.

As part of her divorce settlement, French Gates received $12.5 billion for independent philanthropy, which she has stated will focus on women and families. She has become a prominent megadonor to the Democratic Party, with a focus on abortion rights, and endorsed Kamala Harris in the 2024 US presidential election. In 2025, she published a memoir, The Next Day: Transition, Change and Moving Forward.

Consistently ranked by Forbes magazine as one of the world's most powerful women, French Gates was recognized as one of the BBC's 100 women of 2021. As of February 2026, her net worth is estimated at US$30.4 billion, making her the world's 72nd wealthiest person, according to Forbes.

== Early life and education ==
Melinda Ann French was born on August 15, 1964, in Dallas, Texas. She is the second of four children born to Raymond Joseph French Jr., an aerospace engineer, and Elaine Agnes Amerland, a homemaker. She has an older sister and two younger brothers.

French Gates, a Catholic, attended St. Monica Catholic School, where she was the valedictorian of her class. At age 14, French Gates was introduced to the Apple II by her father and Mrs. Bauer, a school teacher who advocated teaching computer science at the all-girls school. It was from this experience she developed her interest in computer games and the BASIC programming language.

French Gates graduated as valedictorian from Ursuline Academy of Dallas in 1982. She earned a bachelor's degree in computer science and economics from Duke University in 1986 and an MBA from Duke's Fuqua School of Business in 1987. At Duke, French Gates was a member of the Kappa Alpha Theta sorority, Beta Rho Chapter.

== Career ==
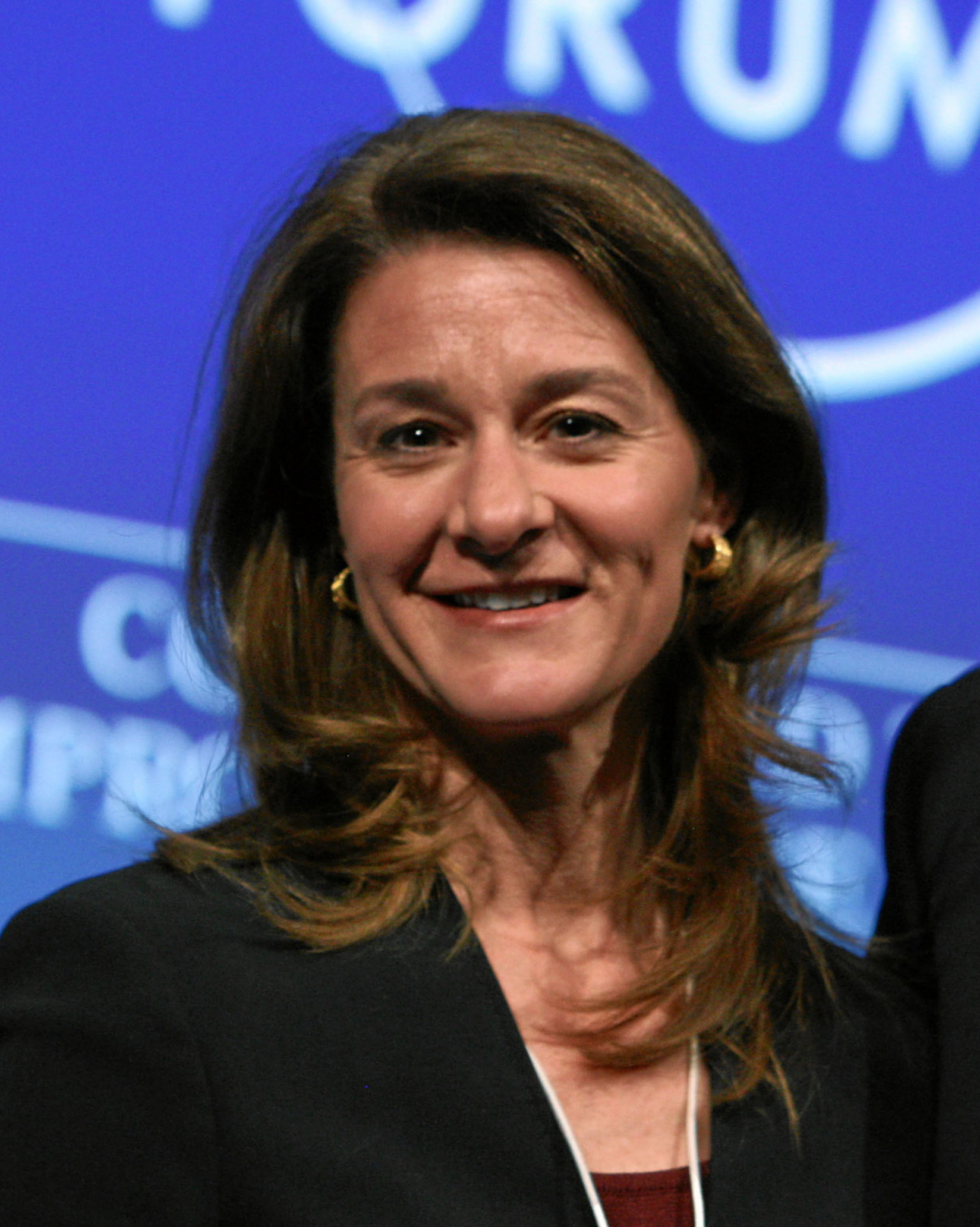
French Gates in 2011

=== Early career and Microsoft ===
French Gates's first job was tutoring children in mathematics and computer programming. After graduation, she became a marketing manager with Microsoft, being responsible for the development of multimedia products. These included Microsoft Cinemania, Encarta, Publisher, Bob, Money, Works and Word. She worked on Expedia, which became one of the most popular travel booking websites. In the early 1990s, French Gates was appointed as general manager of Information Products, a position which she held until 1996. She left Microsoft that year, reportedly, to focus on starting a family.

=== Corporate directorship ===
French Gates served as a member of Duke University's board of trustees from 1996 to 2003. She attends the annual Bilderberg Group conference and has held a seat on the board of directors of Graham Holdings (formerly The Washington Post Company) since 2004. She was also on the board of directors at Drugstore.com but left in August 2006 to focus on philanthropic projects.

=== Philanthropy ===
Since 2000, French Gates has been in the public eye, stating "As I thought about strong women of history, I realized that they stepped out in some way." This has allowed her work shaping and advancing the goals of the Bill & Melinda Gates Foundation to be publicly recognized. By 2022, Bill and Melinda had given US$59.1 billion of their personal wealth to the foundation. On May 13, 2024, French Gates resigned as co-chair of the Bill and Melinda Gates Foundation, to be effective June 7. The foundation was subsequently renamed the Gates Foundation, with Bill Gates as its sole chair.

In 2015, French Gates founded Pivotal Ventures as a separate, independent organization to identify and implement innovative solutions to problems affecting U.S. women and families. In 2019, she committed to $US1 billion in funding, and in 2025 committed another $US1 billion. In October 2024, in partnership with Lever for Change, an affiliate of the MacArthur Foundation French Gates announced a 2024-25 grant competition called Action for Women's Health, which aims to provide $250 million in grants to fund women's health initiatives..

French Gates, whose net worth in 2025 was estimated at $US30 billion, has pledged to give away the majority of her wealth.

=== Writing ===
In 2019, French Gates debuted as an author with the book The Moment of Lift: How Empowering Women Changes the World. Former president Barack Obama starred in a comedy sketch to promote the book. The book highlights the failure to acknowledge women's unpaid work, drawing on feminist economist Dame Marilyn Waring's book If Women Counted.

In 2025, she published the book The Next Day: Transitions, Change, and Moving Forward, also through Flatiron Books.

== Women in technology ==
French Gates's experience of a male-dominated workplace at Microsoft inspired her to encourage more women in the computing field. In September 2016, she announced her desire to increase diversity in the workplace, especially in the technology industry, stating: "Every company needs technology, and yet we're graduating fewer women technologists. That is not good for society. We have to change it." French Gates also spoke about this topic at the 2017 Grace Hopper Celebration of Women in Computing, an annual series of conferences.

== Awards and recognition ==
In 1998, Melinda and Bill Gates were each honored with an American Library Association Honorary Membership. In 2002, Melinda and Bill Gates received the Award for Greatest Public Service Benefiting the Disadvantaged, an award given out, annually, by Jefferson Awards. In December 2005, Melinda and Bill were named, by Time, as Persons of the Year, alongside Bono. Melinda and Bill Gates received the Spanish Prince of Asturias Award for International Cooperation on May 4, 2006, in recognition of their world impact through charitable giving. In November 2006, French Gates was awarded the Insignia of the Order of the Aztec Eagle, together, with Bill, who was awarded the Placard of the same order, both for their philanthropic work around the world in the areas of health and education, particularly in Mexico, and specifically in the program "Un país de lectores".

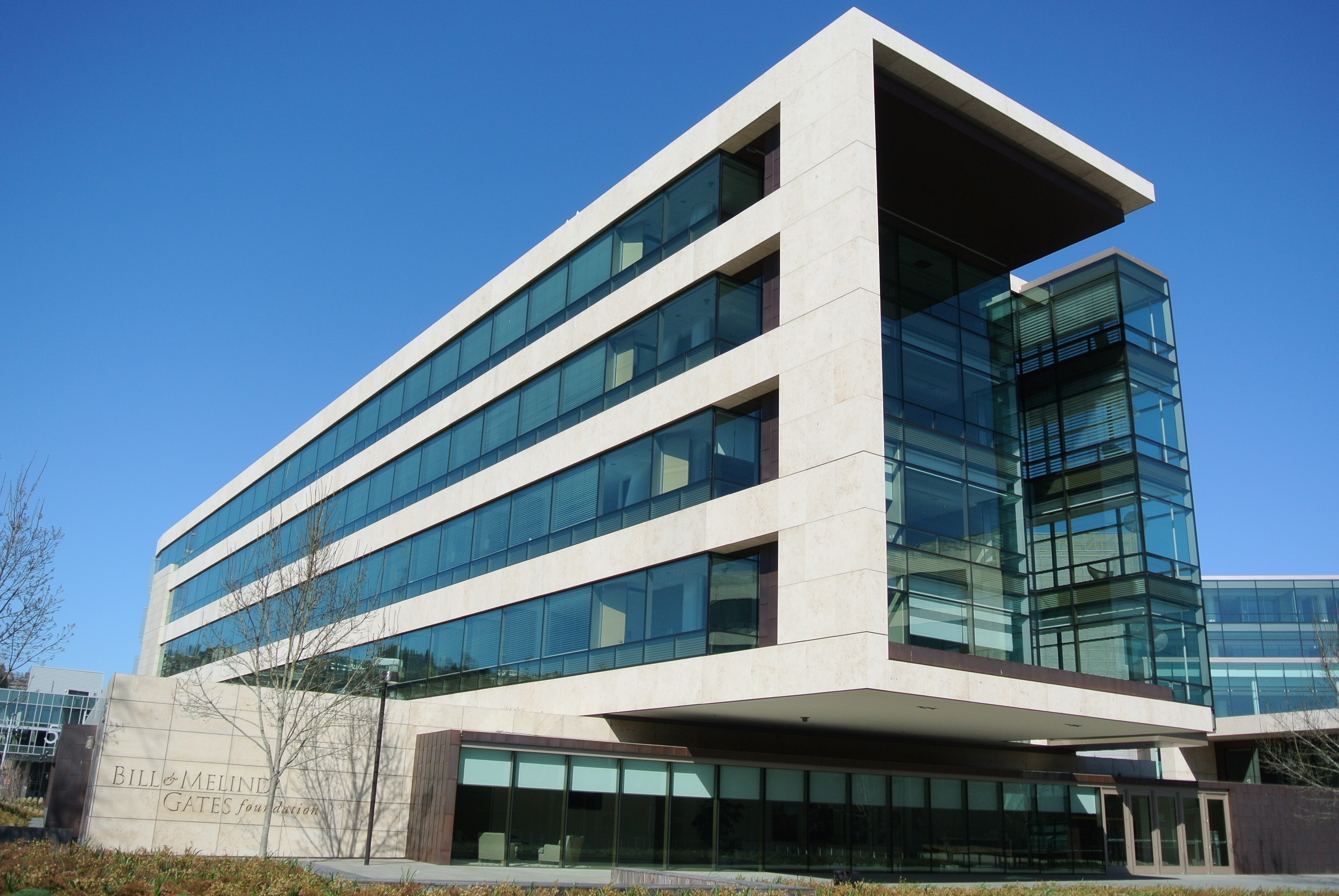
Front building of the Bill & Melinda Gates Foundation in Seattle

In May 2006, in honor of her work to improve the lives of children locally and around the world, Seattle Children's Hospital dedicated the Melinda French Gates Ambulatory Care building at Seattle Children's (formerly Children's Hospital and Regional Medical Center). She chaired a campaign for the hospital to fundraise $300 million to expand facilities, fund under-compensated and uncompensated care, and grow the hospital's research program to find cures and treatments.

In 2007, French Gates received an honorary doctorate in medicine from the Karolinska Institute in Stockholm, Sweden. In 2009, she and her then-husband received honorary degrees from the University of Cambridge. Their benefaction of $210 million in 2000 set up the Gates Cambridge Trust, which funds postgraduate scholars from outside the UK to study at the university. Lastly, she was awarded an honorary Doctor of Humane Letters by Duke University, in 2013, in honor of her philanthropic commitment.

She has been repeatedly recognized, by Forbes in its annual list of the 100 Most Powerful Women, ranking #3 in 2013, 2014, 2015 and 2017, #4 in 2012 and 2016, #5 in 2020 and 2021, and #6 in 2011, 2018, 2019 and 2022, #10 in 2023. She was awarded the UCSF medal in 2013. French Gates was appointed an honorary Dame Commander of the Order of the British Empire (DBE) in 2013, for services to philanthropy and international development. In recognition of the foundation's philanthropic activities in India, Bill and Melinda, jointly, received India's third-highest civilian honor, Padma Bhushan, in 2015. In 2016, President Barack Obama awarded French Gates and her husband with the Presidential Medal of Freedom, for their philanthropic efforts.

In 2017, President François Hollande awarded France's highest national honor to French Gates and her husband, for their charitable efforts, i.e. as Commander of the Legion of Honour. That year, she was awarded the Otto Hahn Peace Medal 2016 of the United Nations Association of Germany (DGVN), Berlin-Brandenburg, "for outstanding services to peace and international understanding" in the historic Berlin Town Hall. That year, French Gates was listed by UK-based company Richtopia at number 12 in the list of 200 Most Influential Philanthropists and Social Entrepreneurs Worldwide. In June 2024, she delivered the Commencement address at Stanford University.

== Political activity ==
After divorcing Bill Gates, French Gates became a prominent megadonor to the Democratic Party, with a focus on abortion rights. In the lead-up to the 2024 US presidential election, she donated over $10 million to Democratic causes. In that election, she endorsed Joe Biden and then, after he stepped aside, Kamala Harris, her first presidential endorsements.

== Personal life ==
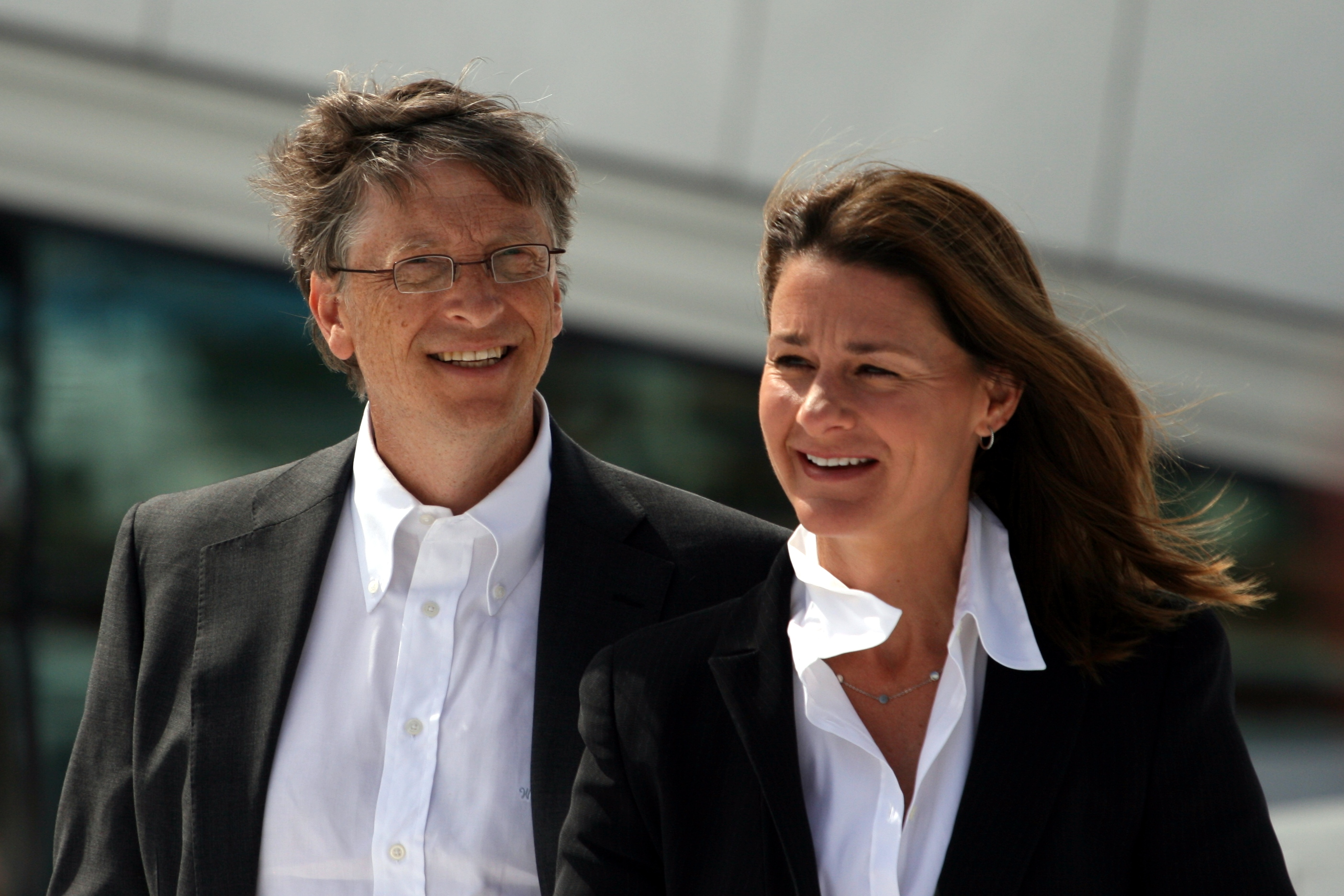
Melinda and her then-husband Bill Gates in 2009

Melinda began dating Microsoft chief executive Bill Gates in 1987, after meeting him at a trade fair in New York. In 1994, she married Gates in a private ceremony held in Lānaʻi, Hawaii. They have three children. The family maintained a home in an earth-sheltered mansion overlooking Lake Washington in Medina, Washington. The family also owned an oceanfront residence in Del Mar, California.

In May 2021, after 27 years of marriage, Bill and Melinda Gates announced their decision to divorce. According to The Wall Street Journal, Melinda had been meeting with divorce lawyers since at least October 2019, after Bill's business dealings with convicted sex offender Jeffrey Epstein became public. Although the couple did not have a prenuptial agreement, Melinda (who filed) did not request spousal support. She was allocated over $2 billion worth of shares and stocks from the divorce, although the full details of the financial settlement have not been disclosed. The divorce was finalized on August 2, 2021. She has publicly used the name Melinda French Gates since the couple separated.

In October 2021, Melinda and Bill both attended the wedding of their eldest daughter Jennifer to the Olympic equestrian Nayel Nassar. In March 2022, Melinda said that she and Bill were "friendly" but not "friends". In November 2022, she was reported to be dating former Fox News correspondent Jon Du Pre. In April 2024, a spokesperson quashed rumors that French Gates and Du Pre had become engaged, confirming that the two were no longer dating. French Gates became a grandmother for the first time in March 2023, when Jennifer gave birth to a daughter.

French Gates is a practicing Catholic.

In 2025, French Gates went public with a new relationship with Philip Vaughn.

In 2026, French Gates joined the ownership group of the Seattle Kraken as a minority owner.

== Published works ==
- The Moment of Lift: How Empowering Women Changes the World (2019, Flatiron Books) ISBN 978-1-250-31357-7
- The Next Day: Transitions, Change, and Moving Forward (2025, Flatiron Books) ISBN 978-1-250-37865-1
